= Damodaran =

Damodaran is a surname. Notable people with the surname include:

- Aswath Damodaran, Professor of Finance at the Stern School of Business at New York University
- Damodaran M. Vasudevan, Dean of the College of Medicine at Amrita Vishwa Vidyapeetham
- K. Damodaran (1912–1976), Marxist and founder leader of the Communist Party in Kerala, India
- Kaithapram Damodaran Namboothiri, lyricist, music director, actor, singer, screenwriter, performer of Carnatic music
- M. Damodaran, thought leader, business executive and former government official
- N. K. Damodaran (1909–1996), writer and translator of Kerala, India
- Nettur P. Damodaran (1913–1978), member of the 1st Lok Sabha (1952) from the constituency of Tellicherry
- S. Damodaran, Indian politician, Member of the Legislative Assembly of Tamil Nadu
- T. Damodaran (born 1935), screenwriter of Malayalam cinema

== See also ==
- Damodar
- Damodara
- Damodarkati
- Demodara
