= List of craters on 253 Mathilde =

This is a list of named craters on 253 Mathilde, an asteroid of the asteroid belt, approximately 53 kilometers in diameter. Because Mathilde is a dark, carbonaceous body, all of its craters have been named after famous coalfields from across the world. As of 2017, there are 23 officially named craters on this asteroid.

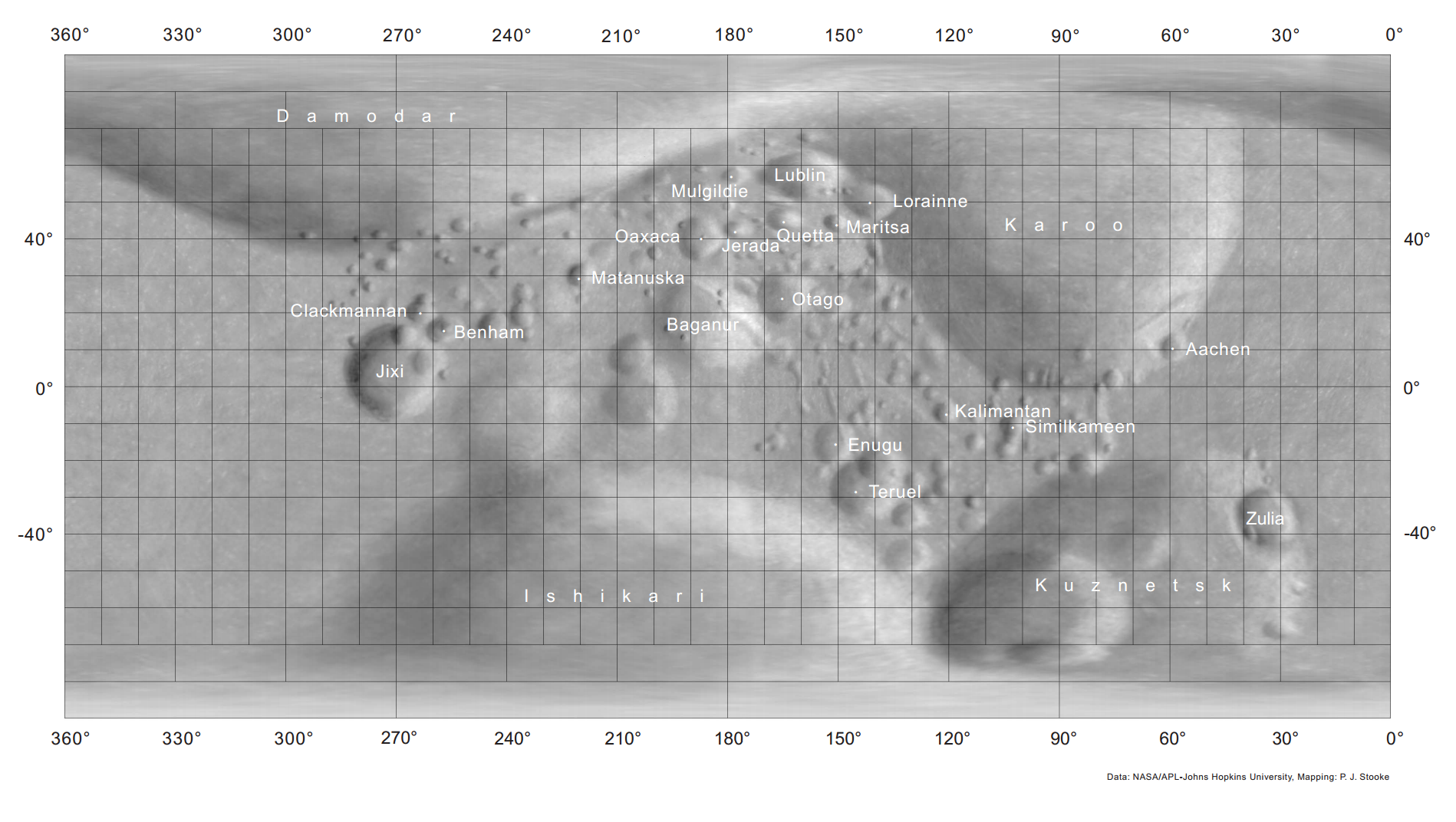
Map of Mathilde and its geological features

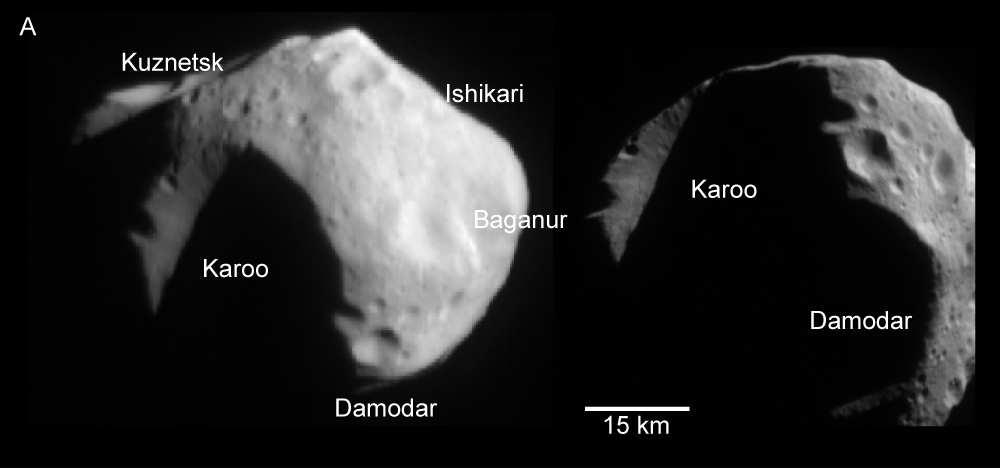
Labelled images of Mathilde showing its geological features

== List ==
Crater	Coordinates	Diameter (km)	Approval Year	Eponym	Ref
Aachen	9.2°N 60.9°W	4.8	2000	German coal basin	WGPSN
Baganur	14.6°N 168.4°E	16.4	2000	Mongolian coal basin	WGPSN
Benham	19°N 112.8°E	2.2	2000	Coal mine in Kentucky USA	WGPSN
Clackmannan	18.9°N 99.2°E	2.8	2000	Scottish coal basin	WGPSN
Damodar	73°N 96.2°E	28.7	2000	Largest Indian coal basin	WGPSN
Enugu	15.3°S 151.6°W	5.9	2000	Nigerian coal field	WGPSN
Ishikari	66.2°S 173.1°E	29.3	2000	Largest Japanese coal field	WGPSN
Jerada	42.1°N 177.3°W	2.5	2000	Largest Moroccan coal basin	WGPSN
Jixi	12.3°S 103.5°E	19.9	2000	Chinese coal basin	WGPSN
Kalimantan	7.7°S 123.7°W	2.7	2000	Coal field on Borneo Indonesia	WGPSN
Karoo	33.5°N 98.4°W	33.4	2000	South African coal basin	WGPSN
Kuznetsk	45.9°S 88.9°W	28.5	2000	Russian coal basin	WGPSN
Lorraine	48.1°N 142.5°W	4.1	2000	Largest French coal basin	WGPSN
Lublin	55.3°N 156.8°W	6.5	2000	Polish coal basin	WGPSN
Maritsa	44.6°N 151.5°W	2.4	2000	Bulgarian coal field	WGPSN
Matanuska	27.3°N 142.7°E	2.9	2000	Coal field in Alaska USA	WGPSN
Mulgildie	57.7°N 176.1°W	2.5	2000	Australian coal basin	WGPSN
Oaxaca	38.7°N 173.7°E	5.2	2000	Mexican coal fields	WGPSN
Otago	23.7°N 164.5°W	7.9	2000	Largest New Zealand coal field	WGPSN
Quetta	45.6°N 165.5°W	3.2	2000	Pakistani coal field	WGPSN
Similkameen	13.5°S 104.7°W	3.4	2000	Canadian coal field	WGPSN
Teruel	28.1°S 142.7°W	7.6	2000	Spanish coal field	WGPSN
Zulia	39.5°S 30.9°W	12.3	2000	Principal state in Venezuela in which coal is mined	WGPSN

back to top

== See also ==
- List of craters on minor planets
- List of craters in the Solar System
