= Regolith =

Layer of loose, superficial deposits covering solid rock

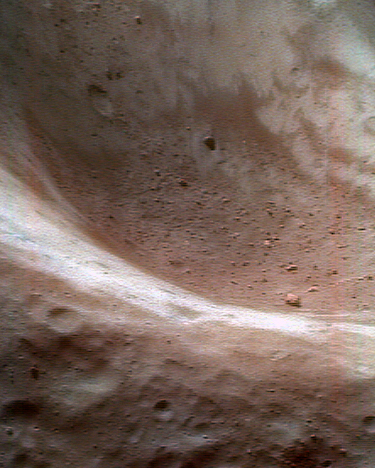
Surface of asteroid 433 Eros

Regolith (/ˈrɛɡəlɪθ/) is a blanket of unconsolidated, loose, heterogeneous superficial deposits covering solid rock. It includes dust, broken rocks, and other related materials and is present on Earth, the Moon, Mars, some asteroids, and other terrestrial planets and moons.

== Etymology ==
The term regolith combines two Greek words: rhegos (ῥῆγος), 'blanket', and lithos (λίθος), 'rock'. The American geologist George P. Merrill first defined the term in 1897, writing:

In places this covering is made up of material originating through rock-weathering or plant growth in situ. In other instances it is of fragmental and more or less decomposed matter drifted by wind, water or ice from other sources. This entire mantle of unconsolidated material, whatever its nature or origin, it is proposed to call the regolith.

== Earth ==
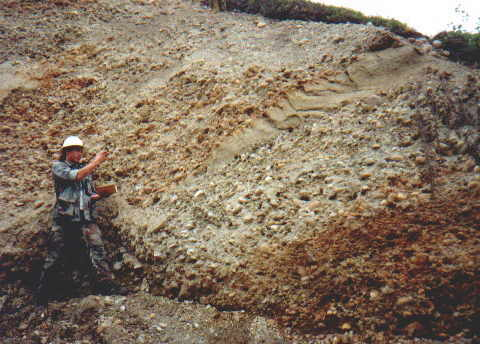
Alluvial gravels in Alaska

Earth's regolith includes the following subdivisions and components:

- soil or pedolith
- alluvium and other transported cover, including that transported by aeolian, glacial, marine, and gravity flow processes.
- "saprolith'", generally divided into the
  - upper saprolite: completely oxidised bedrock
  - lower saprolite: chemically reduced partially weathered rocks
  - saprock: fractured bedrock with weathering restricted to fracture margins
- volcanic ash and lava flows that are interbedded with unconsolidated material
- duricrust, formed by cementation of soils, saprolith and transported material like clays, silicates, iron oxides, oxyhydroxides, carbonates, sulfates and less common agents, into indurated layers resistant to weathering and erosion.
- groundwater- and water-deposited salts.
- biota and organic components derived from it.

Regolith can vary from being essentially absent to hundreds of metres in thickness. Its age can vary from instantaneous (for an ash fall or alluvium just deposited) to hundreds of millions of years old (regolith of Precambrian age occurs in parts of Australia, though this may have been buried and subsequently exhumed.)

Regolith on Earth originates from weathering and biological processes. The uppermost part of the regolith, which typically contains significant organic matter, is more conventionally referred to as soil. The presence of regolith is one of the important factors for most life, since few plants can grow on or within solid rock and animals would be unable to burrow or build shelter without loose material.

Regolith is also important to engineers constructing buildings, roads and other civil works. The mechanical properties of regolith vary considerably and need to be documented if the construction is to withstand the rigors of use.

Regolith may host mineral deposits, such as mineral sands, calcrete uranium, and lateritic nickel deposits. Understanding regolith properties, especially geochemical composition, is critical to geochemical and geophysical exploration for mineral deposits beneath it. The regolith is also an important source of construction material, including sand, gravel, crushed stone, lime, and gypsum.

The regolith is the zone through which aquifers are recharged and through which aquifer discharge occurs. Many aquifers, such as alluvial aquifers, occur entirely within regolith. The composition of the regolith can also strongly influence water composition through the presence of salts and acid-generating materials.

== Moon ==
This famous image of Buzz Aldrin's footprint taken during Apollo 11 shows the fine and powdery texture of the lunar surface.

Regolith covers almost the entire lunar surface, bedrock protruding only on very steep-sided crater walls and the occasional lava channel. This regolith has formed over the last 4.6 billion years from the impact of large and small meteoroids, from the steady bombardment of micrometeoroids and from solar and galactic charged particles breaking down surface rocks. Regolith production by rock erosion can lead to fillet buildup around lunar rocks.

The impact of micrometeoroids, sometimes travelling faster than 96,000 km/h (60,000 mph), generates enough heat to melt or partially vaporize dust particles. This melting and refreezing welds particles together into glassy, jagged-edged agglutinates, reminiscent of tektites found on Earth.

The regolith is generally from 4 to 5 m thick in mare areas and from 10 to 15 m in the older highland regions. Below this true regolith is a region of blocky and fractured bedrock created by larger impacts, which is often referred to as the "megaregolith".

The density of regolith at the Apollo 15 landing site (26.1322°N 3.6339°E) averages approximately 1.35 g/cm^{3} for the top 30 cm, and it is approximately 1.85g/cm^{3} at a depth of 60 cm.

Relative concentration of various elements of lunar soil

The term lunar soil is often used interchangeably with "lunar regolith" but typically refers to the finer fraction of regolith, that which is composed of grains one centimetre in diameter or less. Some have argued that the term "soil" is not correct in reference to the Moon because soil is defined as having organic content, whereas the Moon has none. However, standard usage among lunar scientists is to ignore that distinction. "Lunar dust" generally connotes even finer materials than lunar soil, the fraction which is less than 30 micrometers in diameter. The average chemical composition of regolith might be estimated from the relative concentration of elements in lunar soil.

The physical and optical properties of lunar regolith are altered through a process known as space weathering, which darkens the regolith over time, causing crater rays to fade and disappear.

During the early phases of the Apollo Moon landing program, Thomas Gold of Cornell University and part of President's Science Advisory Committee raised a concern that the thick dust layer at the top of the regolith would not support the weight of the Apollo Lunar Module and that the module might sink beneath the surface. However, Joseph Veverka (also of Cornell) pointed out that Gold had miscalculated the depth of the overlying dust, which was only a couple of centimeters thick. Indeed, the regolith was found to be quite firm by the robotic Surveyor spacecraft that preceded Apollo, and during the Apollo landings the astronauts often found it necessary to use a hammer to drive a core sampling tool into it.

== Mars ==
Mars is covered with vast expanses of sand and dust, and its surface is littered with rocks and boulders. The dust is occasionally picked up in vast planet-wide dust storms. Mars dust is very fine and enough remains suspended in the atmosphere to give the sky a reddish hue.

The sand is believed to move only slowly in the Martian winds due to the very low density of the atmosphere in the present epoch. In the past, liquid water flowing in gullies and river valleys may have shaped the Martian regolith. Mars researchers are studying whether groundwater sapping is shaping the Martian regolith in the present epoch and whether carbon dioxide hydrates exist on Mars and play a role. It is believed that large quantities of water and carbon dioxide ices remain frozen within the regolith in the equatorial parts of Mars and on its surface at higher latitudes.

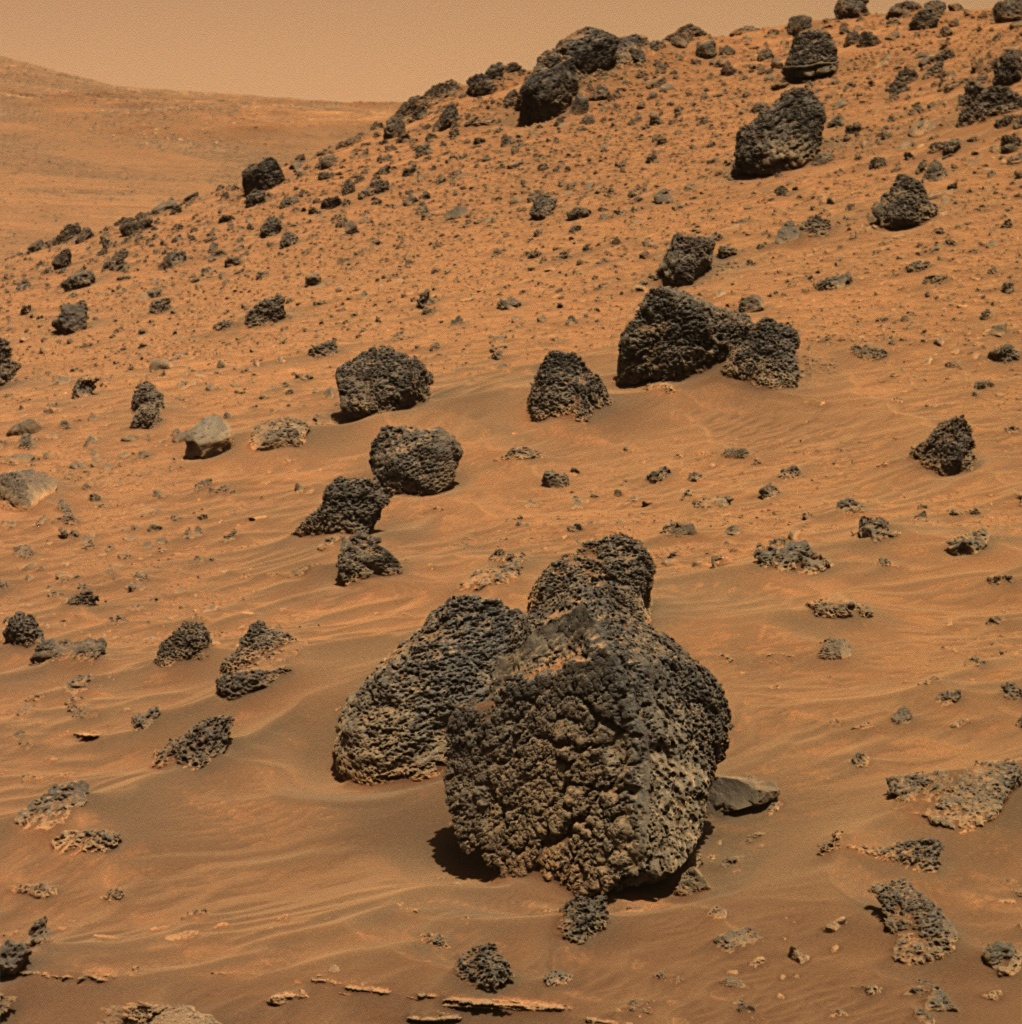
Martian sand and boulders photographed by NASA's Mars Exploration Rover Spirit

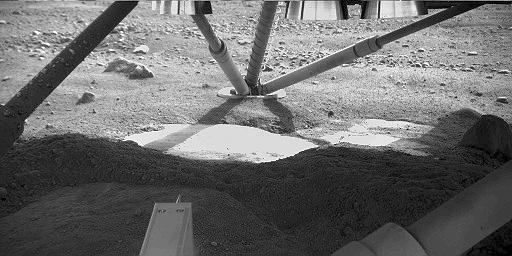
Regolith beneath NASA's Phoenix Mars Lander, where the descent thrusters have apparently cleared away several patches of dust to expose the underlying ice.

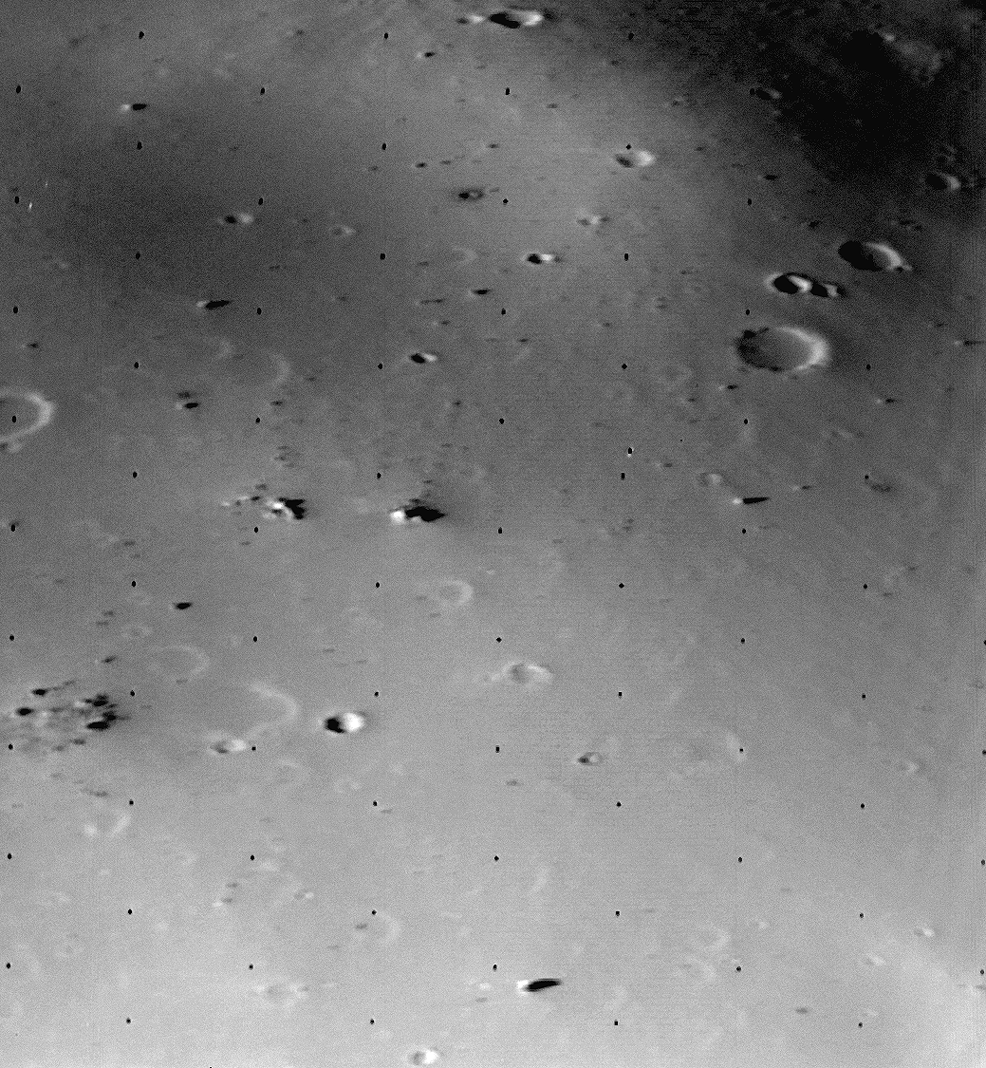
The surface of Deimos, a moon of Mars, is covered by a layer of regolith estimated to be 50 m (160 ft) thick. Viking 2 orbiter image is from a height of 30 km (19 mi).

== Asteroids ==
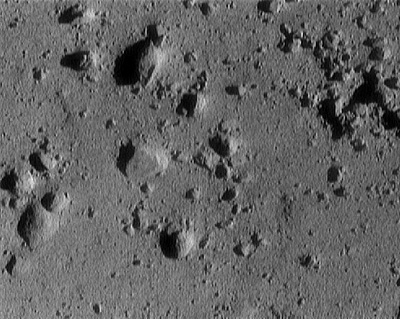
Taken from just 250 m above the surface of Eros as the NEAR Shoemaker spacecraft was landing, this image shows an area that is only 12 m across.

Asteroids commonly have regoliths produced by impact and other surface-altering processes. Spacecraft observations have shown that asteroids' regolith can range from fine-grained deposits to coarse, boulder-rich debris. On Eros, the NEAR Shoemaker mission found that the surface is dominated by a blanket of regolith, with boulders scattered across the landscape and flat, infilled low areas. Samples returned from Itokawa by the Hayabusa mission provided the first direct asteroid regolith grains for laboratory study and revealed evidence of processes such as space weathering and solar-wind implantation.

Subsequent missions greatly expanded understanding of asteroid regolith. Hayabusa 2 returned samples from Ryugu in 2020, and early analysis showed that the material is primitive and rich in water and organic matter. NASA's OSIRIS-REx mission returned rocks and dust from Bennu to Earth in 2023; initial studies found carbon-rich material and evidence of water, while spacecraft observations showed that Bennu's surface is unexpectedly rugged and dominated by boulders rather than broad, smooth deposits. Rosetta observation of 21 Lutetia identified smooth regolith deposits, large boulders, and landslides, while close-up images of the Double Asteroid Redirection Test (DART) impact on Dimorphos and the resulting dusty ejecta helped clarify how loose surface materia behave on small bodies in microgravity.

== Titan ==
Saturn's largest moon Titan is known to have extensive fields of dunes. However, the origin of the material forming the dunes is unknown - it could be small fragments of water ice eroded by flowing methane or particulate organic matter that formed in Titan's atmosphere and rained down on the surface. Scientists are beginning to call this loose icy material regolith because of the mechanical similarity with regolith on other bodies. However, traditionally (and etymologically), the term had been applied only when the loose layer was composed of mineral grains like quartz or plagioclase or rock fragments that were in turn composed of such minerals. Loose blankets of ice grains were not considered regolith because when they appear on Earth in the form of snow, they behave differently from regolith, the grains melting and fusing with only slight changes in pressure or temperature. However, Titan is so cold that ice behaves like rock. Thus, there is an ice-regolith complete with erosion and aeolian and/or sedimentary processes.

The Huygens probe used a penetrometer on landing to characterize the mechanical properties of the local regolith. The surface itself was reported to be a clay-like "material which might have a thin crust followed by a region of relative uniform consistency." Subsequent data analysis suggests that surface consistency readings were likely caused by Huygens displacing a large pebble as it landed and that the surface is better described as a 'sand' made of ice grains. The images taken after the probe's landing show a flat plain covered in pebbles. The pebbles, which may be made of water ice, are somewhat rounded, which may indicate the action of fluids on them.

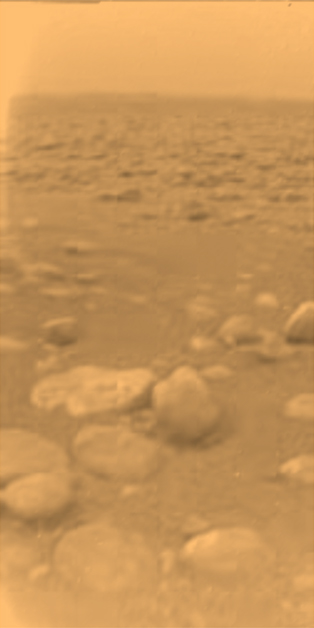
Pebbles on Titan's surface, photographed from a height of about 85 cm by the Huygens spacecraft

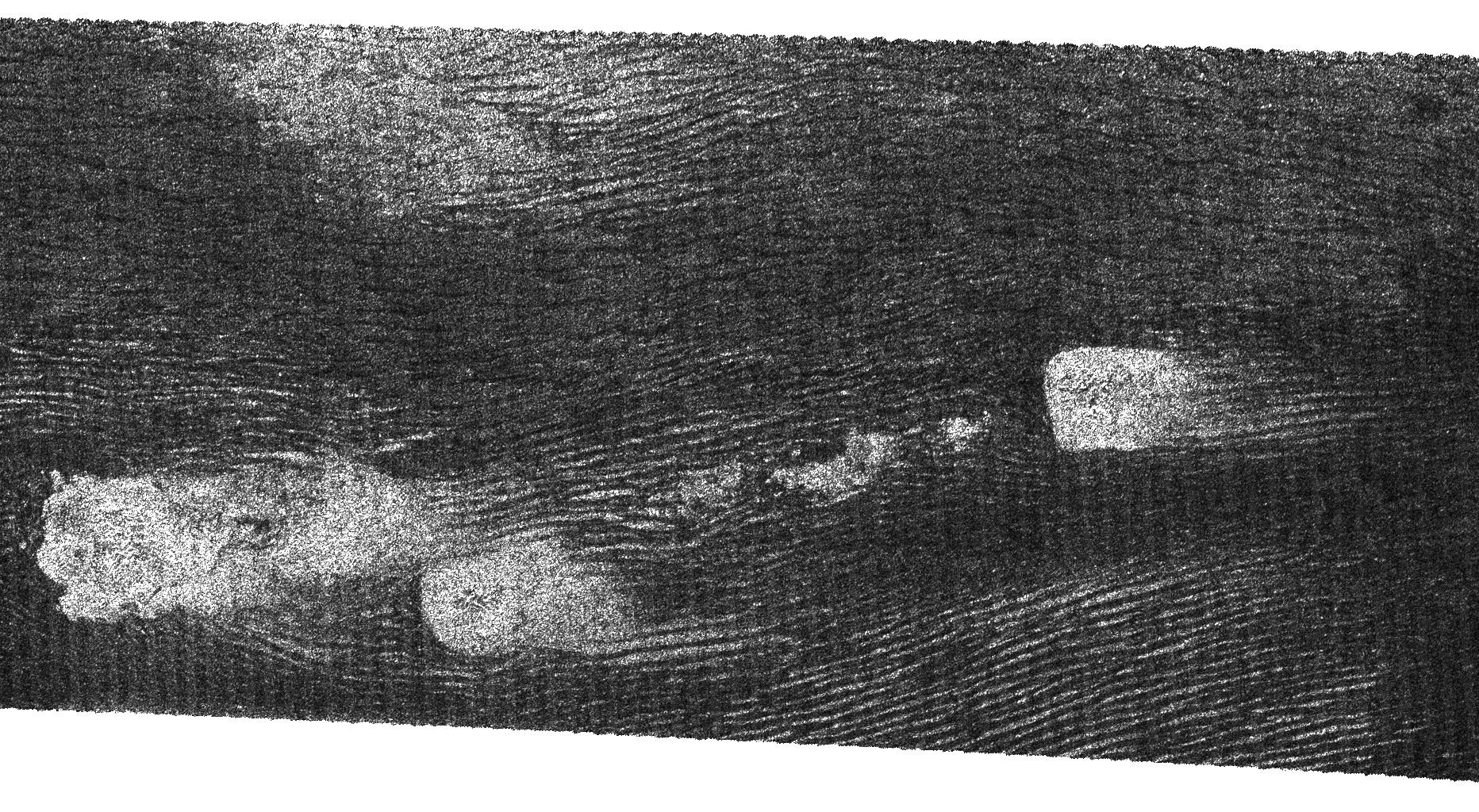
Dunes on Titan's surface in a radar image taken by the Cassini spacecraft of a region approximately 160 by 325 kilometers (99 by 202 miles)

== See also ==
- Flared slope – Rock-wall with a smooth transition into a concavity at the foot zone
- In situ resource utilization – Astronautical use of materials harvested in outer space
- Lunar regolith simulant – Recreation of lunar dust
- Loess – Sediment of accumulated wind-blown dust
- Lunarcrete – Hypothetical aggregate building material, similar to concrete, formed from lunar regolith
- Martian regolith simulant – Material used to simulate the properties of Martian regolith
- Residuum – Weathered rock that is not transported by erosion
- Sand – Granular material composed of finely divided rock and mineral particles
- Saprolite – Chemically weathered rock
- Soil – Earth, a natural material
