= 2732 Witt =

Main-belt asteroid

Discovery
- Discovered by: M. F. Wolf
- Discovery site: Heidelberg Obs.
- Discovery date: 19 March 1926

Designations
- Named after: Carl Gustav Witt (German astronomer)
- Alternative designations: 1926 FG · 1935 DF; 1965 UP_{1} · 1969 RD; 1978 PQ_{1} · 1979 YL_{6}
- Minor planet category: main-belt · (middle); Witt

Orbital characteristics
- Epoch 23 March 2018 (JD 2458200.5)
- Uncertainty parameter 0
- Observation arc: 92.02 yr (33,612 d)
- Aphelion: 2.8250 AU
- Perihelion: 2.6961 AU
- Semi-major axis: 2.7606 AU
- Eccentricity: 0.0234
- Orbital period (sidereal): 4.59 yr (1,675 d)
- Mean anomaly: 129.05°
- Mean motion: 0° 12^{m} 53.64^{s} / day
- Inclination: 6.4925°
- Longitude of ascending node: 145.08°
- Argument of perihelion: 276.05°

Physical characteristics
- Mean diameter: 11.001±0.291 km
- Geometric albedo: 0.305±0.022
- Spectral type: SMASS = A
- Absolute magnitude (H): 11.8

2732 Witt, provisional designation 1926 FG, is a bright asteroid and namesake of the Witt family located in the central regions of the asteroid belt, approximately 11 kilometers (7 miles) in diameter. It was discovered on 19 March 1926, by German astronomer Max Wolf at the Heidelberg-Königstuhl State Observatory in Heidelberg, Germany. The unusual A-type asteroid was named after astronomer Carl Gustav Witt.

== Orbit and classification ==
Witt the parent body and namesake of the Witt family (535), a large family of stony asteroids with more than 1,600 known members.

It orbits the Sun in the central main-belt at a distance of 2.7–2.8 AU once every 4 years and 7 months (1,675 days; semi-major axis of 2.76 AU). Its orbit has an eccentricity of 0.02 and an inclination of 6° with respect to the ecliptic. The body's observation arc begins at Heidelberg in April 1926, two week after its official discovery observation.

== Physical characteristics ==
In the SMASS classification, Witt is an uncommon A-type asteroid, while the overall spectral type for members of the Witt family is that of an S-type.

=== Diameter and albedo ===
According to the survey carried out by the NEOWISE mission of NASA's Wide-field Infrared Survey Explorer, Witt measures 11.001 kilometers in diameter and its surface has a high albedo of 0.305.

=== Rotation period ===
As of 2018, no rotational lightcurve of Witt has been obtained from photometric observations. The body's rotation period, pole and shape remain unknown.

== Naming ==
This minor planet was named by Brian G. Marsden after Carl Gustav Witt (1866–1946), a German astronomer at the Berlin Observatory and a discoverer of minor planets himself, best known for the discovery of the near-Earth asteroid 433 Eros. The official naming citation was published by the Minor Planet Center on 22 September 1983 (M.P.C. 8153).
