= Fillet =

Fillet may refer to:

- Annulet (architecture), part of a column capital, also called a fillet
- Fillet (aircraft), a fairing smoothing the airflow at a joint between two components
- Fillet (clothing), a headband
- Fillet (heraldry), diminutive of the Chief (heraldry)
- Fillet (cut), a piece of meat
- Fillet (geology), a feature on the surface of the Moon
- Fillet (mechanics), the filling of an interior corner
- Fillet (picture framing), a small piece of moulding which fits inside a larger frame, also known as a "slip"
- Fillet (redaction), editing, to cut out letters of a word or name to prevent full disclosure (e.g. "W————m P————t" for "William Pitt")
- Fish fillet

== See also ==
- Filet (disambiguation)
