= Damodar (crater) =

Crater on 253 Mathilde

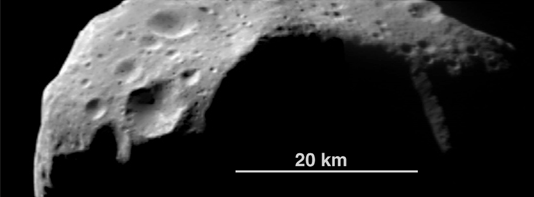
- An edited image of Damodar showing its width as captured by the NEAR Shoemaker spacecraft in 1997
- Feature type: Crater
- Location: 253 Mathilde
- Coordinates: 73°N 96.2°E
- Diameter: 28.7 km (17.8 mi)
- Discoverer: via NEAR Shoemaker in c. June 1997
- Naming: 2000
- Eponym: Damodar Valley

Damodar is a crater on the asteroid 253 Mathilde that was discovered via the NEAR Shoemaker spacecraft in c. June 1997. The crater was named after the Damodar Valley, the largest coal basin in India. The name "Damodar" was officially approved by the International Astronomical Union (IAU) in the year 2000.

== Geology and characteristics ==
Damodar has the coordinates of 73°N 96.2°E, which makes it border and even overlap the nearby crater of Karoo. It has an estimated diameter of 28.7 kilometers (17.8 miles).

The raised crater rims of Damodar suggest that some of the material ejected from its formation traveled only short distances before falling back to the surface; straight sections of some of its rims indicate the influence of large faults or fractures on formation.

== See also ==
- List of craters on 253 Mathilde
