= 422 Berolina =

Main-belt asteroid

Discovery
- Discovered by: G. Witt
- Discovery date: 8 October 1896

Designations
- Pronunciation: /bɛrəˈlaɪnə/
- Named after: Berlin
- Alternative designations: 1896 DA
- Minor planet category: Main belt

Orbital characteristics
- Epoch 31 July 2016 (JD 2457600.5)
- Uncertainty parameter 0
- Observation arc: 109.00 yr (39811 d)
- Aphelion: 2.70724 AU (404.997 Gm)
- Perihelion: 1.74907 AU (261.657 Gm)
- Semi-major axis: 2.22815 AU (333.326 Gm)
- Eccentricity: 0.21502
- Orbital period (sidereal): 3.33 yr (1214.8 d)
- Mean anomaly: 29.4528°
- Mean motion: 0° 17^{m} 46.817^{s} / day
- Inclination: 4.99913°
- Longitude of ascending node: 9.08604°
- Argument of perihelion: 335.361°

Physical characteristics
- Dimensions: 10.714 km
- Synodic rotation period: 12.79 h (0.533 d)
- Absolute magnitude (H): 10.83

422 Berolina is a typical Main belt asteroid.

It was discovered by G. Witt on 8 October 1896 in Berlin. It was first of his two asteroid discoveries. The other was the famous asteroid 433 Eros.

Although it has an orbit similar to the Flora family asteroids, it appears to be an unrelated interloper due to not being of the S spectral type (see the PDS asteroid taxonomy data set).
