= List of geological features on 433 Eros =

This is a list of named geological features on asteroid 433 Eros.

== Craters ==
Craters on Eros are named after famous lovers.

Crater	Coordinates	Diameter (km)	Approval date	Named after	Ref
Abelard	3.5°S 12.2°W	1.1	2003	Peter Abelard	WGPSN
Aida	7.9°N 130.5°W	1.6	2003	Aida	WGPSN
Avtandil	22.5°S 233.1°W	1.2	2003	Avtandil in Shota Rustaveli's The Knight in the Panther's Skin	WGPSN
Bovary	61°S 27.3°W	0.8	2003	Madame Bovary	WGPSN
Casanova	46.6°N 236°W	0.9	2003	Casanova	WGPSN
Catherine	9.1°N 171.1°W	1.1	2003	Cathy in Wuthering Heights	WGPSN
Cupid	8.1°N 230.2°W	1.8	2003	Cupid	WGPSN
Don Juan	29.5°N 356.7°W	1.1	2003	Don Juan	WGPSN
Don Quixote	57.7°S 250.8°W	0.9	2003	Don Quixote	WGPSN
Dulcinea	76.1°S 272.9°W	1.4	2003	Dulcinea	WGPSN
Eurydice	13.5°N 170°W	2.2	2003	Eurydice	WGPSN
Fujitsubo	3.7°S 62.7°W	1.7	2003	Fujitsubo in The Tale of Genji	WGPSN
Galatea	10.2°S 183.1°W	1.4	2003	Galatea	WGPSN
Gamba	20.6°S 54.1°W	1.3	2003	Marina Gamba	WGPSN
Genji	19.5°S 88.6°W	1.5	2003	Genji in The Tale of Genji	WGPSN
Heathcliff	7.4°N 167.9°W	1.1	2003	Heathcliff in Wuthering Heights	WGPSN
Himeros	21.2°N 282.3°W	10	2003	Himeros	WGPSN
Hios	9.4°S 130.9°W	1.3	2003	Hios	WGPSN
Jahan	74.2°N 293.5°W	2.1	2003	Shah Jahan	WGPSN
Kastytis	6.8°N 161.3°W	1.7	2003	Kastytis (Lithuanian folklore)	WGPSN
Leander	25.6°N 210.3°W	1.4	2003	Leander	WGPSN
Leylie	3°S 23.5°W	1.9	2003	Leylie in Leylie and Majnoon by Jami	WGPSN
Lolita	35.2°S 197.7°W	1.8	2003	Lolita	WGPSN
Mahal	79.4°N 170°W	1.2	2003	Mumtaz Mahal	WGPSN
Majnoon	3.8°N 28.8°W	2.1	2003	Majnoon	WGPSN
Mélisande	67.1°N 185.6°W	1	2003	Mélisande	WGPSN
Narcissus	18.2°N 7.1°W	2.9	2003	Narcissus	WGPSN
Orpheus	25.6°N 176.7°W	1.1	2003	Orpheus	WGPSN
Pao-yü	73.2°S 105.6°W	0.8	2003	Jia Baoyu in Dream of the Red Chamber	WGPSN
Pelléas	63.1°N 221.3°W	1.2	2003	Pelléas	WGPSN
Psyche	31.6°N 94.6°W	4.8	2003	Psyche	WGPSN
Pygmalion	1.8°S 191.1°W	1.7	2003	Pygmalion	WGPSN
Radames	5.2°S 115.1°W	1.6	2003	Radames	WGPSN
Selene	14.2°S 12.5°W	3.6	2003	Selene	WGPSN
Tai-yü	47°S 126.1°W	1.4	2003	Lin Daiyu in Dream of the Red Chamber	WGPSN
Tutanekai	56.4°N 3.3°W	2.1	2003	Tutanekai (Polynesian mythology)	WGPSN
Valentine	14.6°N 208.4°W	2.2	2003	Saint Valentine	WGPSN

== Dorsa ==
Dorsa (ridges) on Eros are named after astronomers who studied the asteroid.

Dorsum	Coordinates	Diameter (km)	Approval date	Named after	Ref
Finsen Dorsum	48°S 350°W	0	2003	William Stephen Finsen	WGPSN
Hinks Dorsum	42°N 318°W	0	2003	Arthur Robert Hinks	WGPSN

== Regiones ==
Regions (geologically distinct areas) on Eros are named after the co-discoverers of the asteroid.

Regio	Coordinates	Diameter (km)	Approval date	Named after	Ref
Charlois Regio	16°S 330°W	0	2003	Auguste Charlois	WGPSN
Witt Regio	18°N 348°W	0	2003	Gustav Witt	WGPSN
