= Damodar =

Damodar may refer to:

== Indian religion and mythology ==
- Damodar (name of Krishna), the 367th Name of Vishnu from the Vishnu Sahasranāma

== Geography ==
- Damodar River in India
- Damodar Himalaya - a sub-range of the Nepal Himalaya in Gandaki Province
- A union of Phultala Upazila in Khulna district, Bangladesh

=== Extraterrestrial ===
- Damodar, a crater on 253 Mathilde

== People ==
- Damodar Bhandari, member of 2nd Nepalese Constituent Assembly from CPN (UML)
- Damodar Das Arora a famous Punjabi poet
- Damodar K. Mavalankar an Indian theosophist
- Damodar Pande - First Prime Minister of Nepal
- Damodar Raao - Music Director, Actor, and Singer
- Vinayak Damodar Savarkar
- Damodar, a character in the films Dungeons & Dragons and Dungeons & Dragons: Wrath of the Dragon God
