= Filet =

Filet may refer to:

- Filet, Switzerland
- Fillet (cut), a cut piece of meat
- Filet lace

== See also ==
- Fillet (disambiguation)
- Philae, an island in Lake Nasser, Egypt
- Philae (spacecraft), a robotic lander
