= Karoo (crater) =

Karoo is an impact crater on the asteroid 253 Mathilde, named for the Great Karoo Basin, a coal basin in South Africa. It is 33.4 kilometers in diameter and was the most prominent crater seen during NEAR Shoemaker's flyby of the asteroid.

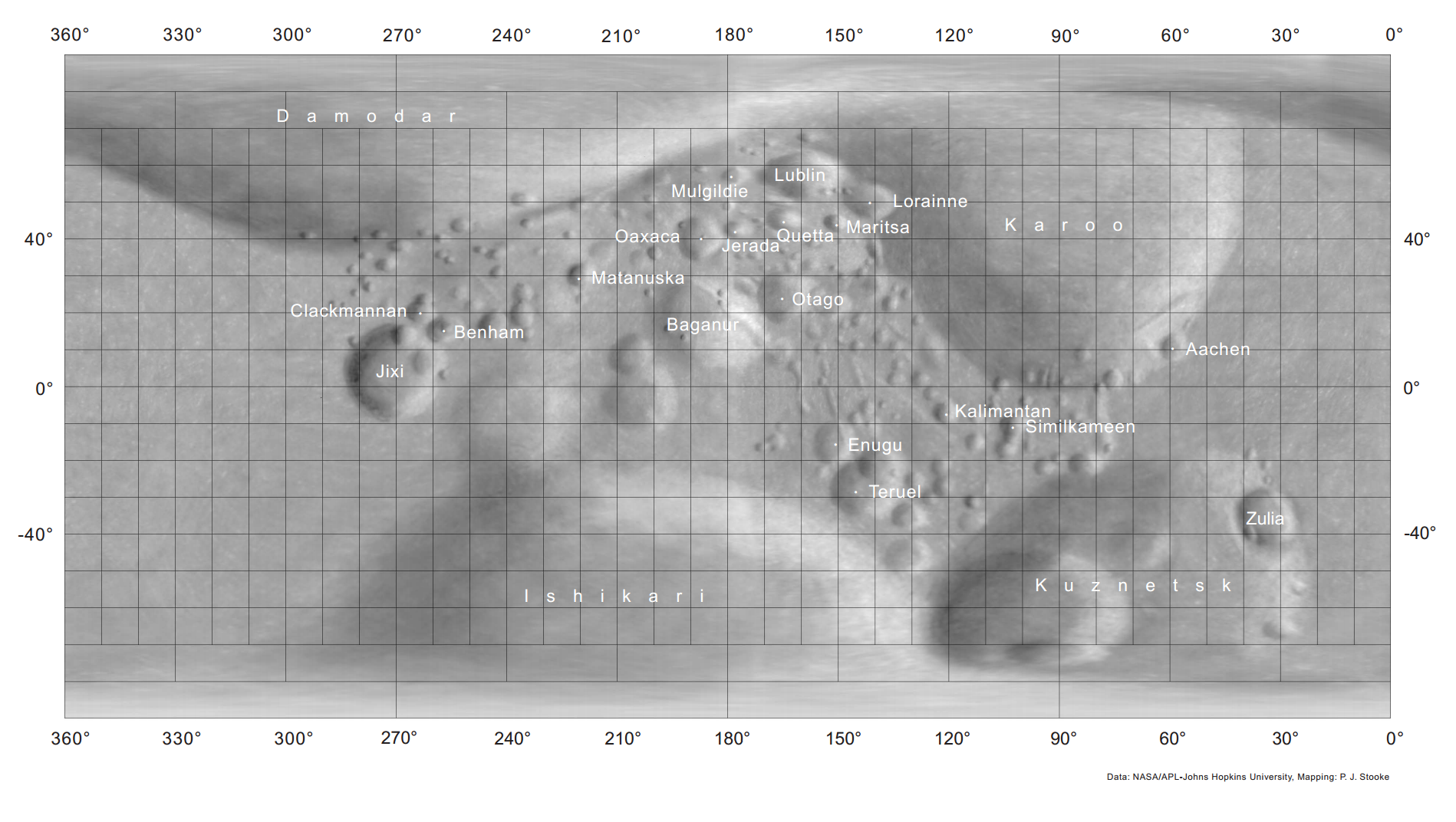
