= Arthur Robert Hinks =

British astronomer and geographer

Arthur R. Hinks
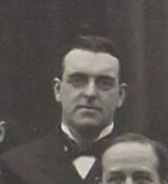
- Arthur Robert Hinks in 1913
- Born: 26 May 1873; London, UK
- Died: 14 April 1945 (aged 71); Royston, Hertfordshire, UK
- Education: Trinity College, Cambridge
- Known for: measurement of solar parallax
- Awards: Leconte Prize (1910); Victoria Medal (1938); Cullum Geographical Medal (1943); CBE, Fellow of the Royal Society
- Scientific career
- Fields: astronomy, geography
- Workplaces: Cambridge Observatory

Arthur Robert Hinks, CBE, FRS (26 May 1873 – 14 April 1945) was a British astronomer and geographer.

As an astronomer, he is best known for his work in determining the distance from the Sun to the Earth (the astronomical unit) from 1900 to 1909: for this achievement, he was awarded the Gold Medal of the Royal Astronomical Society and was elected a fellow of the Royal Society. His later professional career was in surveying and cartography, an extension of his astronomical interests.

== Astronomical career ==
=== Early work ===
Hinks was educated at Whitgift School and Trinity College, Cambridge, where he graduated Bachelor of Arts in 1895.

=== Measurement of the solar parallax ===
Although Hinks had originally intended to measure stellar parallax, and produced an ambitious plan to do so in conjunction with Henry Norris Russell, an even more fundamental opportunity arose with the discovery in 1898 of 433 Eros. It soon became apparent that Eros was a near-Earth asteroid, and would be passing very close to the Earth in late 1900 – early 1901. The closest approach was about 30 million miles (48 million kilometres), or about 125 times the distance from the Earth to the Moon, a stone's-throw in astronomical terms. With Eros passing so close to the Earth, it would be possible to measure its parallax to high precision, and so calculate the solar parallax or, in other terms, the distance from the Sun to the Earth (now known as the astronomical unit, a name that was coined at about this time).

An international effort to obtain accurate observations of Eros was put in place under the co-ordination of Maurice Loewy, then director of the Paris Observatory. Hinks was an enthusiastic, even zealous member of the team from the start, and was responsible for the observations from Cambridge Observatory. In total, no fewer than fifty-eight observatories were involved. Hinks spent three months observing Eros from dusk until dawn in 1900/01 – or rather, trying to observe Eros: the weather in Cambridge was unusually wet that winter, and Hinks only had half a dozen cloud-free nights during the whole period. (Note: Despite the reputation of the British weather, Cambridge, in the east of the country, has a relatively dry climate: the average rainfall (552 mm, 21.7″ annually) is the same as that in Netanya in Israel, for example… Source: WorldClimate.com.) Fortunately he was using a photographic telescope, and was able to obtain some 500 exposures, as results from more traditional visual methods (meridian line or micrometre measurements) would have been far less conclusive.

Hinks published the Cambridge results in November 1901, but this was far from the end of the task. The results from all the participating observatories had to be collated and analysed, a monumental feat which initially fell to Loewy in Paris. An additional problem was that it was not clear how the different measurement uncertainties should be treated, especially as different observatories used different methods to calculate the apparent position of Eros. Hinks also participated in this initial period, publishing a comparison of his Cambridge results with those from the Lick Observatory on Mount Hamilton, California, and from the Goodsell Observatory near Minneapolis, Minnesota. However Hinks became increasingly concerned about the systematic errors in several of the results, and published his own provisional result for the solar parallax in 1904, based on photographic observations from nine observatories.

Hinks continued to work on the problem as secretary of the Royal Astronomical Society, a post he held from 1903 to 1913 – he admitted himself that solar parallax work took up most of his time at the Cambridge Observatory, although he did publish other papers. When Loewy died suddenly in 1907 (aged 74), Hinks appears to have taken over the final reduction of the data. The final result was published in 1909: the solar parallax was 8.807 ± 0.0027 arcseconds, slightly larger than the 8.80 arcseconds that Newcomb had calculated and that had been internationally accepted since 1896.

=== Measurement of the lunar mass ===
A bonus result was that Hinks was also able to calculate the ratio between the mass of the Earth and the mass of the Moon as 81.53 ± 0.047.

=== Later work ===
Hinks resigned from the Cambridge Observatory in 1914 when he was passed over for the directorship in favour of the younger Arthur Eddington (1882–1944), a brilliant mathematician and one of the earliest astrophysicists. Hinks complained

"the whole trend in policy in Cambridge & England generally […] is to take astronomical posts as sustenance for mathematicians. […] They must have been mad to imagine that a man who had the ambition to do what I had been able to do would be content with an inferior position and no fun all his life."

After the First World War Hinks admitted to William Wallace Campbell that he felt out of place in the new astronomy dominated by general relativity and its consequences:

"Now that Peace is in sight, I find my thoughts reverting to astronomy a little, and I hope eventually to finish off some things I had to leave incomplete in 1913. […] The statistical stuff with its integral equations was bad enough. But relativity is much further beyond the limits of my comprehension, and I shall find when I start to make up my two years arrears of reading that I am hopelessly outclassed."

== Geographical career ==
In 1903, Hinks undertook a course in surveying at the School of Military Engineering in Chatham in Kent. At the time, there was no National Service (conscription) in the United Kingdom, and it is possible that he did the course to gain a profession to support his young family (he had been married for four years, and his son Roger was born in 1903), after eight years in a poorly paid junior post in astronomy. The same year, he was promoted to senior assistant at the Cambridge Observatory and appointed secretary of the Royal Astronomical Society.

Hinks gained his first full academic post in 1908, a lectureship in surveying and cartography at the Cambridge School of Geography (part of the University of Cambridge, as was the Observatory) funded by the Royal Geographical Society (RGS). In 1911, he was elected a fellow of the Society, becoming assistant secretary in 1912/1913 and succeeding John Scott Keltie as secretary in 1915. As secretary of the RGS, he also acted as editor of the Geographical Journal: he held both posts until his death in 1945. During the First World War, Hinks prepared maps and did other geographical work for the General staff. Hicks also provided reports on the boundary treaties put in place after the war, and on the implementation of the Treaty of Versailles, particularly the Upper Silesia plebiscite.

Hinks was involved in the organisation of the expeditions to observe the total solar eclipse in May 1919 from Príncipe off the west coast of Africa and from Sobral in Brazil, during which his nemesis from Cambridge, Eddington, would provide one of the first proofs of Einstein's theory of general relativity.

Hink's most controversial role was as joint secretary of the Mount Everest Committee, a joint body of the RGS and the Alpine Club dedicated to organising an ascent of the world's highest mountain. The initial 1921 British Mount Everest reconnaissance expedition suggested a route to the top from the Tibetan side, and a second expedition was sent out in 1922 to try to reach the summit. The 1922 expedition never made it to the summit, despite three attempts and, on the second attempt led by George Mallory, an avalanche killed seven sherpas. However George Finch and Capt. Geoffrey Bruce set a new altitude record, climbing to 8326 metres (27,316 feet) on the second summit attempt.

Another expedition was organised for 1924. However Hinks vetoed Finch's inclusion on the expedition, despite his altitude record during the 1922 expedition, ostensibly because he was divorced and had accepted money for lectures. The true reason was that Finch was Australian, and Hinks was determined that the first person to reach the summit should be British. Mallory (who had also given paid lectures about the 1922 expedition) initially refused to return to Everest without Finch, but was eventually persuaded by members of the British royal family, at Hinks' request. Mallory and Andrew Irvine died during the third attempt on the summit, ending all attempts to climb Mount Everest for several years.

Hinks published two textbooks on cartography and surveying, Map Projections (1912) and Maps and Survey (1913). After the war, he was involved in the development of radio time signals and in geodesy in general, two interests that are very much linked with astronomy.

== Awards ==
- 1910: Prix Leconte of the French Academy of Sciences
- 1911: Fellowship of the Royal Geographical Society (FRGS)
- 1912: Gold Medal of the Royal Astronomical Society
- 1913: Fellowship of the Royal Society (FRS)
- 1913: Gresham Professor of Astronomy, appointed by the City of London Corporation, a post he would hold until 1941
- 1920: Commander of the Order of the British Empire (CBE)
- 1938: Victoria Medal of the Royal Geographical Society
- 1943: Cullum Geographical Medal of the American Geographical Society
- 2003: The Hinks Dorsum, a ridge on 433 Eros, is named in honour of Hinks and his association with the asteroid by the International Astronomical Union

== Notes and references ==
=== Hinks' published work ===
- Hinks, A. R. (1893), "Correlation of Solar and Magnetic Phenomena", Nature, 49 (1256): 78, Bibcode:1893Natur..49...78H, doi:10.1038/049078b0, S2CID 4053028.
- Hinks, Arthur R. (1897), "Preliminary Note on a Personal Equation depending on Magnitude affecting the Right Ascensions of the Stars in the Cambridge Zone Catalogue of the Astronomische Gesellschaft, and its determination from Astrographic Catalogue Plates", Monthly Notices of the Royal Astronomical Society, 57 (6): 473–83, Bibcode:1897MNRAS..57..473H, doi:10.1093/mnras/57.6.473.
- Hinks, Arthur R. (1898a), "On some Attempts to Counteract by Instrumental Adjustment certain Effects of Refraction in Stellar Photography", Monthly Notices of the Royal Astronomical Society, 58 (8): 428–40, Bibcode:1898MNRAS..58..428H, doi:10.1093/mnras/58.8.428.
- Hinks, Arthur R. (1898b), "A Diagram showing the Conditions under which Observations for the Determination of Stellar Parallax are to be made", Monthly Notices of the Royal Astronomical Society, 58 (8): 440–43, Bibcode:1898MNRAS..58..440H, doi:10.1093/mnras/58.8.440.
- Hinks, A. R. (1898c), "Time chart for parallax observations", Monthly Notices of the Royal Astronomical Society, 58 (8): 440–443, Bibcode:1898MNRAS..58..442H, doi:10.1093/mnras/58.8.440.
- Hinks, Arthur R. (1898d), "Observations of the Leonids, 1898 November, made at the Cambridge Observatory", Monthly Notices of the Royal Astronomical Society, 59 (2): 113–15, Bibcode:1898MNRAS..59..113H, doi:10.1093/mnras/59.2.113.
- Hinks, Arthur R. (1899), "Note on the Construction and Use of Réseaux", Monthly Notices of the Royal Astronomical Society, 59 (9): 530–32, Bibcode:1899MNRAS..59..530H, doi:10.1093/mnras/59.9.530.
- Hinks, Arthur R. (1900a), "Observations of the Leonids made at the Cambridge Observatory on 1899 November 13, 14, 15", Monthly Notices of the Royal Astronomical Society, 60 (7): 458–65, Bibcode:1900MNRAS..60..458H, doi:10.1093/mnras/60.7.458.
- Hinks, Arthur R. (1900b), "On Planning Photographic Observations of Eros", Monthly Notices of the Royal Astronomical Society, 60 (8): 543–46, Bibcode:1900MNRAS..60..543H, doi:10.1093/mnras/60.8.543.
- Hinks, A. R. (1900c), "Opposition of Eros, 1900", Monthly Notices of the Royal Astronomical Society, 60 (8): 543–546, Bibcode:1900MNRAS..60..543H, doi:10.1093/mnras/60.8.543.
- Hinks, Arthur R. (1901a), "The Cambridge Machine for measuring celestial photographs", Monthly Notices of the Royal Astronomical Society, 61 (7): 444–58, Bibcode:1901MNRAS..61..444H, doi:10.1093/mnras/61.7.444.
- Hinks, Arthur R. (1901b), "Experimental Reduction of some Photographs of Eros made at the Cambridge Observatory for the Determination of the Solar Parallax", Monthly Notices of the Royal Astronomical Society, 62: 22–41, Bibcode:1901MNRAS..62...22H, doi:10.1093/mnras/62.1.22.
- Hinks, Arthur R. (1901c), "On the Accuracy of Measures on Photographs: Remarks on recent Papers by M. Loewy and Mr. H. C. Plummer", Monthly Notices of the Royal Astronomical Society, 62 (2): 132–37, Bibcode:1901MNRAS..62..132H, doi:10.1093/mnras/62.2.132.
- Hinks, Arthur R. (1902a), "Note on one of the stars selected as an "étoile de repère" for the reduction of photographs of Eros", Astronomische Nachrichten, 159 (2): 27–28, Bibcode:1902AN....159...27H, doi:10.1002/asna.19021590206.
- Hinks, Arthur R. (1902b), "Experimental Reduction of Photographs of Eros for the Determination of the Solar Parallax. Second Paper: Combination of results from Mount Hamilton, Minneapolis, and Cambridge", Monthly Notices of the Royal Astronomical Society, 62 (8): 545–61, Bibcode:1902MNRAS..62..551F, doi:10.1093/mnras/62.8.551.
- Hinks, Arthur R. (1903a), "A Graphical Method of Applying to Photographic Measures the Terms of the Second Order in the Differential Refraction", Monthly Notices of the Royal Astronomical Society, 63 (3): 138–47, Bibcode:1903MNRAS..63..138H, doi:10.1093/mnras/63.3.138.
- Hinks, Arthur R. (1903b), "Eros and the solar parallax", The Observatory, 26: 341–44, Bibcode:1903Obs....26..341H.
- Hinks, Arthur R. (1904a), "Eros and the solar parallax", The Observatory, 27: 97–101, Bibcode:1904Obs....27...97H.
- Hinks, Arthur R. (1904b), "Eros and the solar parallax", The Observatory, 27: 207, Bibcode:1904Obs....27..207H.
- Hinks, Arthur R. (1904c), "Reduction of 295 Photographs of Eros made at Nine Observatories during the period 1900 November 7–15, with a determination of the Solar Parallax", Monthly Notices of the Royal Astronomical Society, 64 (8): 701–27, Bibcode:1904MNRAS..64..701H, doi:10.1093/mnras/64.8.701.
- Hinks, Arthur R. (1905a), "On the Determination of Proper Motions without Reference to Meridian Places", Monthly Notices of the Royal Astronomical Society, 65 (7): 713–18, Bibcode:1905MNRAS..65..713H, doi:10.1093/mnras/65.7.713.
- Hinks, Arthur R.; Russell, Henry Norris (1905b), "Determinations of Stellar Parallax from Photographs made at the Cambridge Observatory. Introductory Paper", Monthly Notices of the Royal Astronomical Society, 65 (8): 775–87, Bibcode:1905MNRAS..65..775H, doi:10.1093/mnras/65.8.775.
- Hinks, Arthur R. (1905c), "Magnitude Equation in Right Ascension", The Observatory, 28: 290–92, Bibcode:1905Obs....28..290H.
- Hinks, Arthur R. (1905d), "New Measurements of the Distance of the Sun", The Observatory, 28: 348–54, 370–77, Bibcode:1905Obs....28..348H.
- Hinks, Arthur R. (1906a), "Solar parallax papers, No. 4. The Magnitude Equation in Right Ascension of the Étoiles de Repère", Monthly Notices of the Royal Astronomical Society, 66 (8): 481–91, Bibcode:1906MNRAS..66..481H, doi:10.1093/mnras/66.8.481.
- Hinks, Arthur R. (1906b), "Solar Parallax Papers, No. 5. Examination of the Photographic Places of Stars published in the Paris Eros Circulars", Monthly Notices of the Royal Astronomical Society, 67: 70–119, Bibcode:1906MNRAS..67...70H, doi:10.1093/mnras/67.1.70.
- Hinks, Arthur R. (1907a), "The magnitude equation in visual observations of right ascension", Astronomische Nachrichten, 174 (5): 65–71, Bibcode:1907AN....174...65H, doi:10.1002/asna.19071740502.
- Hinks, Arthur R. (1907b), "Solar parallax papers, No. 6. Construction of a Photographic Catalogue of Star Places", Monthly Notices of the Royal Astronomical Society, 68 (2): 82–97, Bibcode:1907MNRAS..68Q..82H, doi:10.1093/mnras/68.2.82.
- Hinks, Arthur R. (1909a), "Solar parallax papers, No. 7. The General Solution from the Photographic Right Ascensions of Eros, at the Opposition of 1900", Monthly Notices of the Royal Astronomical Society, 69 (7): 544–67, Bibcode:1909MNRAS..69..544H, doi:10.1093/mnras/69.7.544.
- Hinks, Arthur R. (1909b), "A question of orthography", The Observatory, 32: 256, Bibcode:1909Obs....32..256H.
- Hinks, Arthur R. (1909c), "Solar parallax papers, No. 8. The Mass of the Moon, derived from photographic observations of Eros made in 1900–01", Monthly Notices of the Royal Astronomical Society, 70: 63–75, Bibcode:1909MNRAS..70R..63H, doi:10.1093/mnras/70.1.63.
- Hinks, Arthur R. (1910a), "Comet 1910 a, observed at Cambridge Observatory", Monthly Notices of the Royal Astronomical Society, 70 (5): 462–64, Bibcode:1910MNRAS..70..462H, doi:10.1093/mnras/70.5.462.
- Hinks, Arthur R. (1910b), "Solar parallax papers, No. 9. The General Solution from the Micrometric Right Ascensions of Eros, at the opposition of 1900", Monthly Notices of the Royal Astronomical Society, 70 (8): 588–603, Bibcode:1910MNRAS..70..588H, doi:10.1093/mnras/70.8.588.
- Hinks, Arthur R. (1910c), "A new Variable or a Nova 97.1910 Cygni", Astronomische Nachrichten, 186 (8): 125–27, Bibcode:1910AN....186..125H, doi:10.1002/asna.19101860806.
- Hinks, Arthur Robert (1911), Astronomy, New York: Holt.
- Hinks, Arthur R. (1911a), "Observations of Nova Lacertæ made at the Cambridge Observatory", Monthly Notices of the Royal Astronomical Society, 71 (3): 191–94, Bibcode:1911MNRAS..71..191H, doi:10.1093/mnras/71.3.191.
- Hinks, Arthur R. (1911b), "Some modern telescope constructions", Transactions of the Optical Society, 13 (1): 7–9, Bibcode:1911TrOS...13....7H, doi:10.1088/1475-4878/13/1/302.
- Hinks, Arthur R. (1911c), "Note on 97.1910 Cygni", Monthly Notices of the Royal Astronomical Society, 71 (6): 517–19, Bibcode:1911MNRAS..71..517H, doi:10.1093/mnras/71.6.517.
- Hinks, Arthur R. (1911d), "The galactic distribution of the spiral nebulæ", Monthly Notices of the Royal Astronomical Society, 71: 588, Bibcode:1911MNRAS..71..588H, doi:10.1093/mnras/71.7.588 (inactive 11 July 2025).
- Hinks, Arthur R. (1911e), "On the galactic distribution of gaseous nebulæ and of star clusters", Monthly Notices of the Royal Astronomical Society, 71 (8): 693–701, Bibcode:1911MNRAS..71..693H, doi:10.1093/mnras/71.8.693.
- Hinks, Arthur R. (1912), Map projections; revised edition published in 1921.
- Hinks, Arthur R. (1913), Maps and Survey, Cambridge University Press.
- Hinks, Arthur R. (1915a), "Sir George Darwin and the capture theory of satellites", The Observatory, 38: 365–66, Bibcode:1915Obs....38..365H.
- Hinks, Arthur R. (1915b), "Some questions relating to the Shape of the Earth, suggested by Mr. Harold Jeffreys' paper "Certain hypotheses as to the structure of the Earth and the Moon"", Monthly Notices of the Royal Astronomical Society, 76: 8–13, Bibcode:1915MNRAS..76....8H, doi:10.1093/mnras/76.1.8.
- Hinks, Arthur R. (1917), "Geographical Conditions for the Observation of the Total Solar Eclipse, 1919 May 28–29", Monthly Notices of the Royal Astronomical Society, 78: 79–82, Bibcode:1917MNRAS..78...79H, doi:10.1093/mnras/78.1.79.
- Hinks, Arthur R. (1919), "A large meteor in the northern Congo", The Observatory, 42: 162–63, Bibcode:1919Obs....42..162H.
- Hinks, Arthur R. (1920), "The Plebiscite Area of Upper Silesia", The New Europe, 14: 105–6.
- Hinks, Arthur R. (1924), "John Harrison", Nature, 113 (2842): 570, Bibcode:1924Natur.113..570H, doi:10.1038/113570c0, S2CID 4149796.
- Hinks, Arthur R. (1925), "Time Signals for Surveyors in the Field", The Geographical Journal, 66 (3): 242–46, Bibcode:1925GeogJ..66..242H, doi:10.2307/1782979, JSTOR 1782979.
- Hinks, Arthur R. (1927), New geodetic tables for Clarke's figure of 1880, with transformation to Madrid 1924, London: Royal Geographical Society, Bibcode:1927ngtc.book.....H.
- Hinks, Arthur R. (1929), Wireless time signals for the use of surveyors, London: Royal Geographical Society, Bibcode:1929wtsu.book.....H.
- Hinks, Arthur Robert, ed. (1938), Hints to travellers. volume 2: Organization and Equipment; Scientific Observation; Health, Sickness and Injury, London: Royal Geographical Society.

=== Further reading ===
- "Obituary", Geographical Journal, 105: 146–51, 1945, includes wholeplate b/w photograph.
