= Quetta (crater) =

Impact crater on 253 Mathilde, a minor planet

- Feature type: Impact crater
- Location: 253 Mathilde
- Coordinates: 45.60°N 165.50°W
- Diameter: 3.2 km (2.0 mi)
- Naming: 2000
- Eponym: Quetta, Pakistan

Quetta is an impact crater on 253 Mathilde, a minor planet. The crater was named after Quetta, the eponymous coal field in Pakistan. The name "Quetta" was officially approved by the International Astronomical Union (IAU) in 2000.

== Geology and characteristics ==
Its coordinates are 45.60°N 165.50°W and its diameter is 3.2 kilometres (2.0 mi).
