= Himeros (crater) =

Largest impact crater on 433 Eros

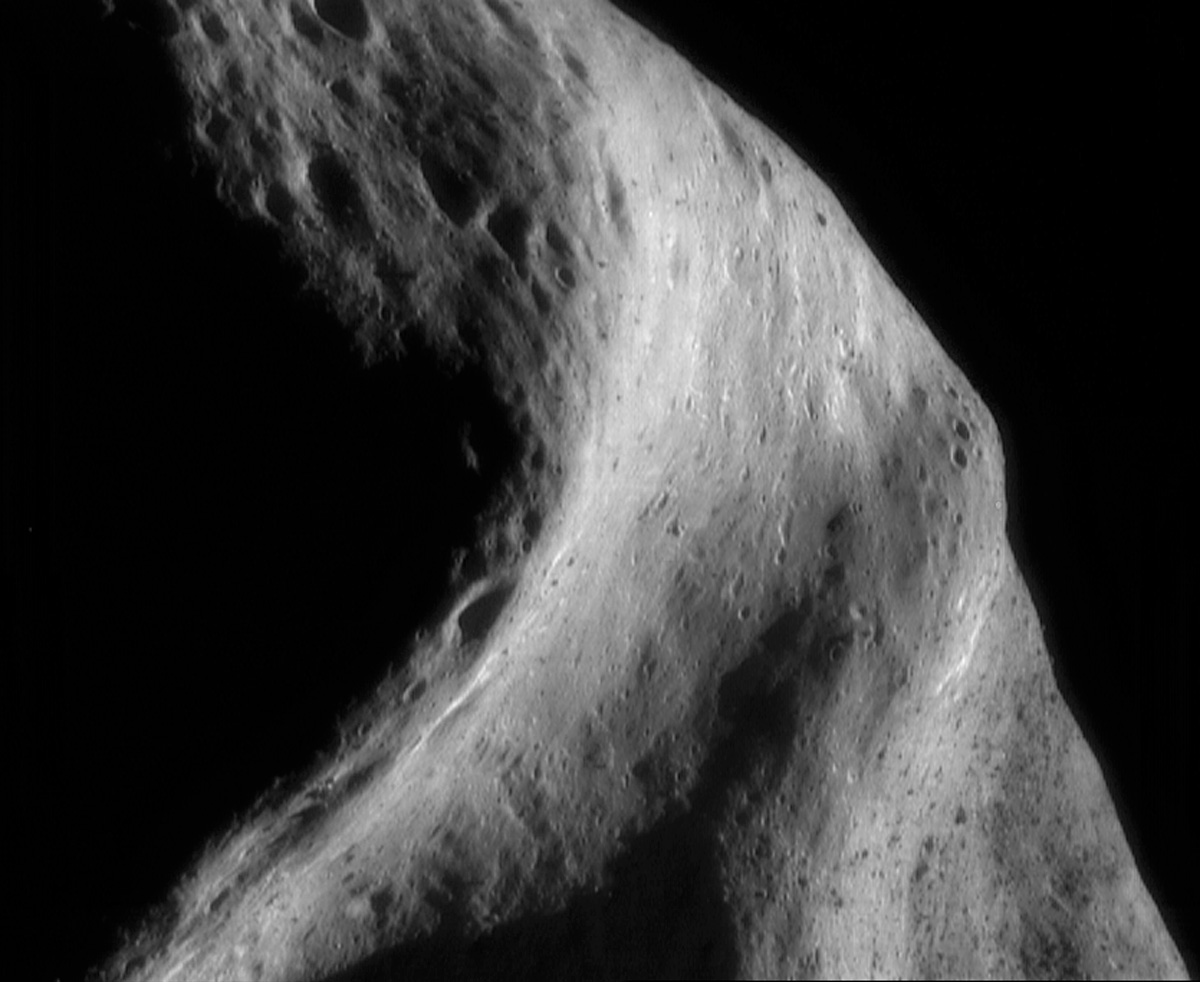
- Himeros as viewed by NEAR Shoemaker.
- Feature type: Impact crater
- Location: Eros
- Coordinates: 21.20°N 77.7°E
- Diameter: 11 km
- Depth: ~1.5 km
- Discoverer: NEAR Shoemaker
- Eponym: Himeros

Himeros, also nicknamed the Saddle, is a large impact crater on the asteroid Eros. It is centered at roughly 21.20°N, 77.7°E, on Eros's eastern hemisphere. The crater is named after Himeros of Greek mythology, one of seven Erotes, attendant to Eros, and the personification of the longing for love. The name Himeros was officially approved by the International Astronomical Union (IAU) in 2003.

== Geology and characteristics ==
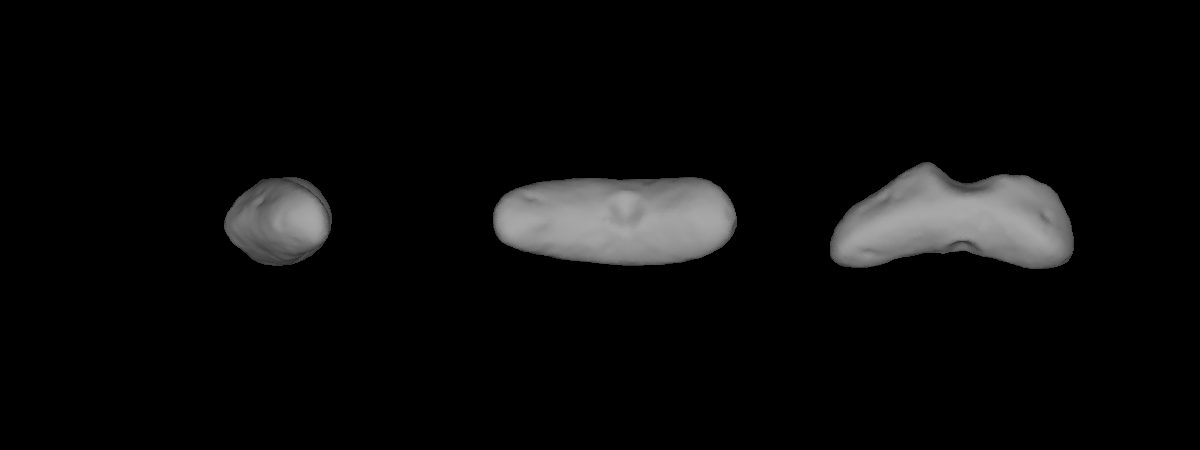
Lightcurve-derived 3D model of 433 Eros. Himeros is prominently visible on the rightmost view.

At roughly 11 kilometres (6.8 miles) in diameter, Himeros is the largest identified feature on Eros. The crater is large enough to nearly exceed the diameter of Eros in the north–south direction. (Note: Eros's dimensions are roughly 34.4 × 11.2 × 11.2 km.) Himeros's rim, like those of Eros's second- and third-largest impact craters (Shoemaker and Psyche, respectively), is very rounded and smooth. Its northern and southern rims are degraded or absent, leading to its elongated shape. The southwestern rim is interrupted by Shoemaker, a younger impact crater roughly 7 kilometres (4.3 mi) wide. Several features lie within Himeros. An extensive ridge, Rahe Dorsum, begins within the floor of Himeros before continuing over the crater rim towards Psyche. Given Rahe Dorsum's straightness, it likely represents a sheet of strong material that was more resistant to the violent formation of Himeros, surviving as a ridge.

Himeros's immense size relative to Eros means that the impact event that created it likely had widespread consequences for the asteroid. In 2015, a team of astronomers led by Yasui Minami proposed that seismic waves from the Himeros impact event would have shaken the entire asteroid, with the modelled peak ground acceleration exceeding that of Eros's surface gravity up to 134 kilometres (83 miles) from the crater. As a result, surface material on Eros likely moved globally because of Himeros's formation. Himeros's central location on Eros means that its formation should have obliterated most craters smaller than 500 metres (1,600 feet) in diameter. Though the interior of Himeros has relatively few craters, that there are many small craters on Eros indicates that Himeros is ancient. The low crater density within Himeros is therefore likely due to the formation of Shoemaker.
