= Carl Gustav Witt =

German astronomer (1866–1946)

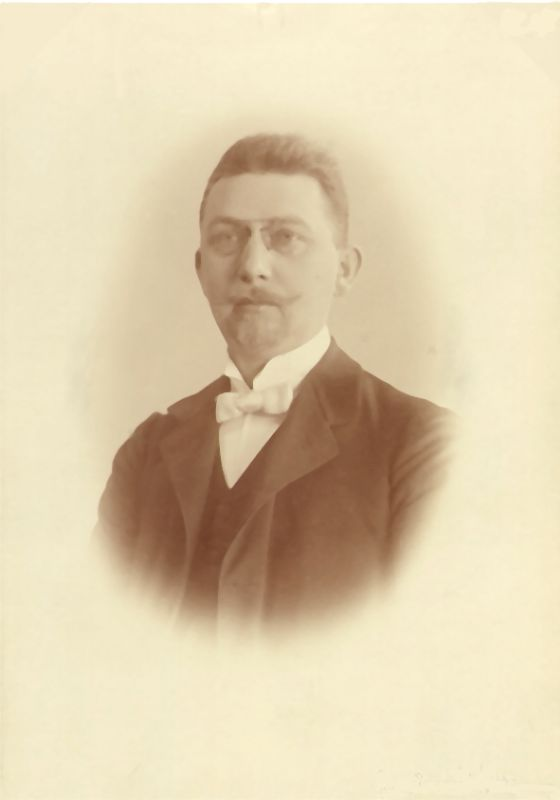
- Born: 29 October 1866; Berlin, Kingdom of Prussia
- Died: 3 January 1946 (aged 79)
- Education: Friedrich-Wilhelms-Universität
- Known for: discovery of asteroids
- Awards: Iron Cross 2nd Class, 2732 Witt is named after him
- Scientific career
- Fields: Astronomy
- Workplaces: Friedrich-Wilhelms-Universität, Urania Sternwarte Berlin
- Doctoral advisor: Julius Bauschinger

Asteroids discovered: 2
422 Berolina	8 October 1896
433 Eros	13 August 1898

Carl Gustav Witt (29 October 1866 – 3 January 1946) was a German astronomer and discoverer of two asteroids who worked at the Berlin Urania Observatory, a popular observatory of the Urania astronomical association of Berlin.

He wrote a doctoral thesis under the direction of Julius Bauschinger.

Witt discovered two asteroids, most notably 433 Eros, the first asteroid with a male name, and the first known near-Earth object. His first minor planet discovery was the main-belt asteroid 422 Berolina, that bears the Latin name of his adoptive city.

The minor planet 2732 Witt – an A-type asteroid from the main-belt, discovered by Max Wolf at Heidelberg Observatory in 1926 – was named in his memory by American astronomer and MPC's longtime director, Brian G. Marsden. Naming citation was published on 22 September 1983 (M.P.C. 8153).
