= N. K. Damodaran =

Indian writer and translator

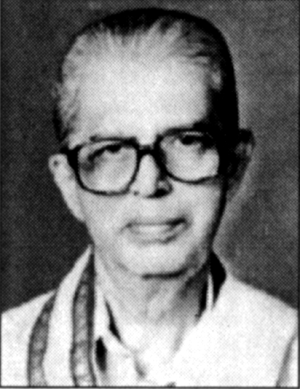

N.K.Damodaran (1909–1996) was a writer and translator of Kerala, India.

== Early life ==
He was born on 3 August 1909 in Aranmula in Pathanamthitta district in Kerala. After taking B.A.B.L. he joined government service as Accounts Officer and later worked in SPCS. He has also worked as Sub editor in Sarvavijnana kosam and as Editor in Kalakaumudi weekly. He has published more than 20 books. He got Kalyani Krishna Menon Prize in 1967 and Sovietland Nehru award in 1974. His prime contribution was in the area of translation and he was the first to translate Fyodor Dostoyevsky's novels into Malayalam.

He died on 28 June 1996. He has six children namely Prasannakumari, Dr. Santhadevi, Krishnakumari, Dr. Syamaladevi, Dr. S.C. Bose, Adv. P S Laila.

== Major works ==
- Kerala sahithyam
- Kusumarchana
- Karamasov Sahodaranmar
- Ninditharum Peeditharum
- Adithattukkal
- Thamassakthi
- Maricha Veedu
- Boothavishtar
