= Fillet (geology) =

Geological term

In planetary geology the term fillet describes a fine-grained deposit in an apron shape configuration that partially or entirely surround boulders on the surface of the Moon. Fillets are a morphological expression of lunar soil development.

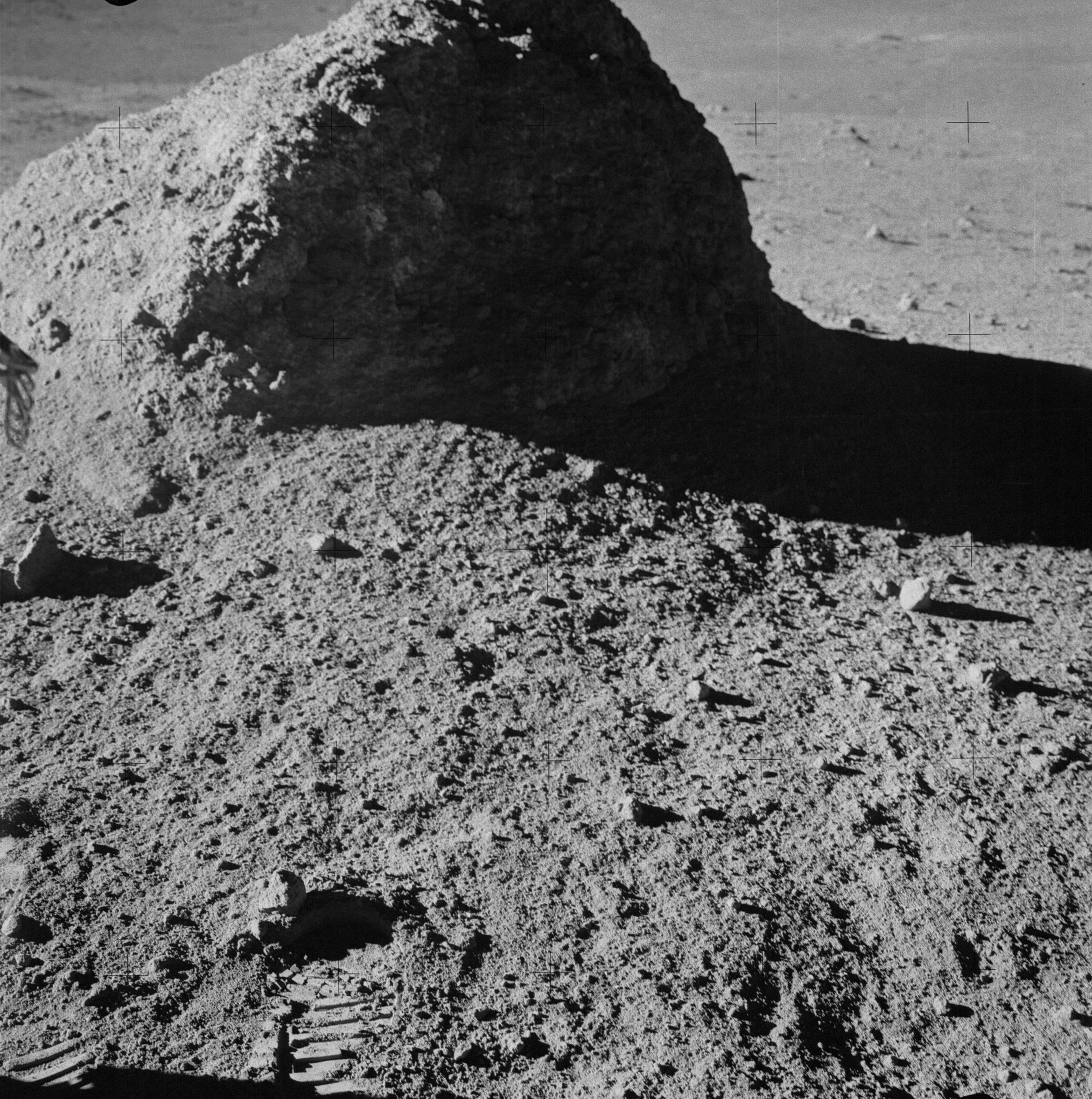
Image taken by astronaut Al Shepard of the boulder named 'Filleted Rock' displaying a fine-grained deposit at its base, i.e., fillet. Image taken at Station C2 of the Apollo 14 landing site. Rock width is about 1.5 m.

The fillet is characterized by an onlap contact with the adjacent rock and by a shallow or concave profile. Associated morphologies are thin pockets of dust present on top of the boulder and rock fragments either laying on top of, or buried by, the fillet. These rock fragments are chipped off from the original boulder by impacts of large meteoroids.

== Origin ==
The preliminary scientific report of Apollo era indicate that two processes, not mutually excluding, can be responsible for the development of fillets: 1) Deposition of material eroded from the boulder itself by the abrasive action of micrometeoroids, and 2) deposition of ejecta material from distant impact craters against the side of the boulder.

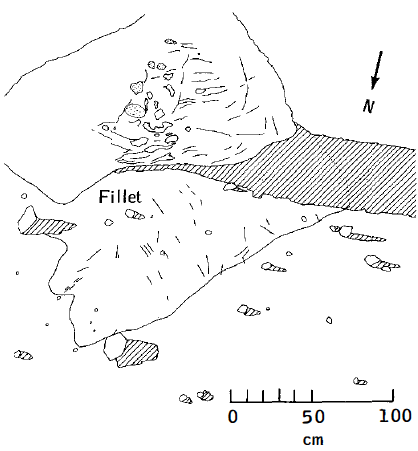
Sketch of fillet on Filleted Rock.

== Visibility ==
Generally, fillets are smooth and, compared to rocks, are topographically subdued. Their reflectance (color and brightness) is similar to that of the nearby regolith (soil). As a consequence of these properties, the identification of fillets strongly depends on the geometric condition of illumination and observation, and fillet might not readily identifiable in images. The presence of a fillet adjacent to a rock can be nevertheless inferred using two locations around the rock: where the fillet casts its own shadow and on the side facing the Sun, where it appears brighter than the surrounding flat regolith. This identification of fillet can be shown using as example a 3D printed model of filleted rock illuminated at a grazing angle.

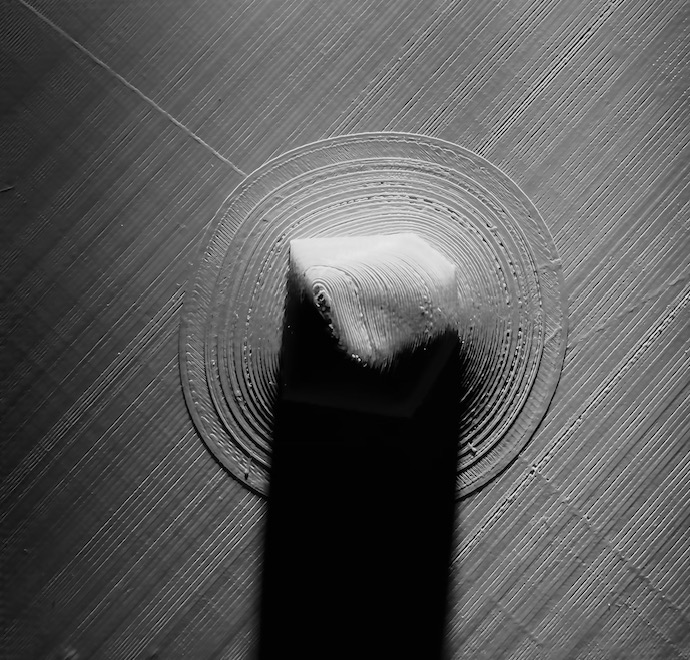
A 3D printed rock with adjacent fillet illuminated from the top of the figure. To be noted is one side of the fillet brighter than the surrounding soil and the fillet shadow (penumbra) next to the rock's main shadow.
