= NEAR Shoemaker =

American space probe to asteroid (1996–2001)

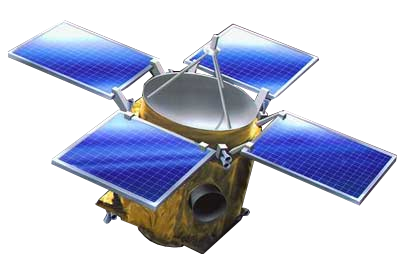
- Artist's rendering of the NEAR Shoemaker spacecraft
- Mission type: Orbiter (433 Eros)
- Operator: NASA · APL
- COSPAR ID: 1996-008A
- SATCAT no.: 23784
- Website: Official website
- Mission duration: 5 years, 21 days

Spacecraft properties
- Launch mass: 805 kg
- Dry mass: 487 kilograms (1,074 lb)
- Power: 1,800 W

Start of mission
- Launch date: February 17, 1996 20:43:27 UTC
- Rocket: Delta II 7925-8
- Launch site: Cape Canaveral LC-17B

End of mission
- Last contact: February 28, 2001 ~00:00 UTC
- Landing date: February 12, 2001 20:01 UTC
- Landing site: South of Himeros crater, 433 Eros

Flyby of 253 Mathilde
- Closest approach: June 27, 1997 12:56 UTC
- Distance: 1,212 kilometers (753 mi)

433 Eros orbiter
- Orbital insertion: February 14, 2000 15:33 UTC
- Orbits: 230 orbits
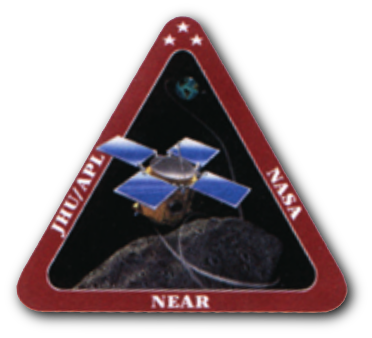
- Official insignia of the NEAR Shoemaker mission Discovery Program

Near Earth Asteroid Rendezvous (NEAR), later renamed NEAR Shoemaker in honor of planetary scientist Eugene Shoemaker, was a robotic space probe developed by the Johns Hopkins University Applied Physics Laboratory for NASA. Launched in 1996, it was designed to study the near-Earth asteroid 433 Eros from orbit over the course of a year. It was the first spacecraft to orbit an asteroid and successfully land on one. In February 2000, NEAR Shoemaker reached Eros and entered orbit around it. On February 12, 2001, the spacecraft landed on the asteroid and was deactivated just over two weeks later.

NEAR's primary scientific objectives were to measure Eros's bulk properties, composition, mineralogy, morphology, internal mass distribution, and magnetic field. Secondary objectives included studying the asteroid's regolith, its interactions with the solar wind, possible ongoing activity indicated by dust or gas, and its rotational state. These data were intended to improve understanding of asteroids in general, their relationship to meteoroids and comets, and conditions in the early Solar System.

To achieve these objectives, the spacecraft carried an X-ray and gamma-ray spectrometer, a near-infrared imaging spectrograph, a multispectral camera with a charge-coupled device (CCD) imaging detector, a laser rangefinder, and a magnetometer. A radio science experiment used tracking data to estimate Eros's gravitational field. The instruments had a combined mass of 56 kg (123 lb) and required 80 watts of power.

== Development ==
NEAR was the first robotic space probe built by Johns Hopkins University's Applied Physics Laboratory (APL). A previous plan for the mission was for it to go to 4660 Nereus and do a flyby of 2019 van Albada en route. In January 2000, it would rendezvous with Nereus, but instead of staying, it would visit multiple asteroids and comets. Some of the choices that were discussed were 2P/Encke, 433 Eros (which became the mission's primary target), 1036 Ganymed, 4 Vesta, and 4015 Wilson–Harrington. The Small-Body Grand Tour was a plan to visit two asteroids and two comets over a decade with the spacecraft.

== Mission profile ==
=== Summary ===
The mission's primary goal was to study the near-Earth asteroid 433 Eros from orbit for approximately one year. Eros is an S-type asteroid approximately 13 × 13 × 33 km in size, the second largest near-Earth asteroid. Initially, the orbit was circular with a radius of 200 km. The orbit radius was brought down in stages to a 50 × 50 km orbit on April 30, 2000, and decreased to 35 × 35 km on July 14, 2000. The orbit was raised over succeeding months to a 200 × 200 km orbit and then slowly decreased and altered to a 35 × 35 km retrograde orbit on December 13, 2000. The mission ended with a touchdown in Eros's "saddle" region on February 12, 2001.

Some scientists claim that the mission's ultimate goal was to link Eros, an asteroidal body, to meteorites recovered on Earth. With sufficient data on chemical composition, a causal link could be established between Eros and other S-type asteroids, and those meteorites believed to be pieces of S-type asteroids (perhaps Eros itself). Once this connection is established, meteorite material can be studied with large, complex, and evolving equipment, and the results can be extrapolated to bodies in space. NEAR did not prove or disprove this link to the satisfaction of scientists.

Between December 1999 and February 2001, NEAR used its gamma-ray spectrometer to detect gamma-ray bursts as part of the InterPlanetary Network.

=== The journey to Mathilde ===
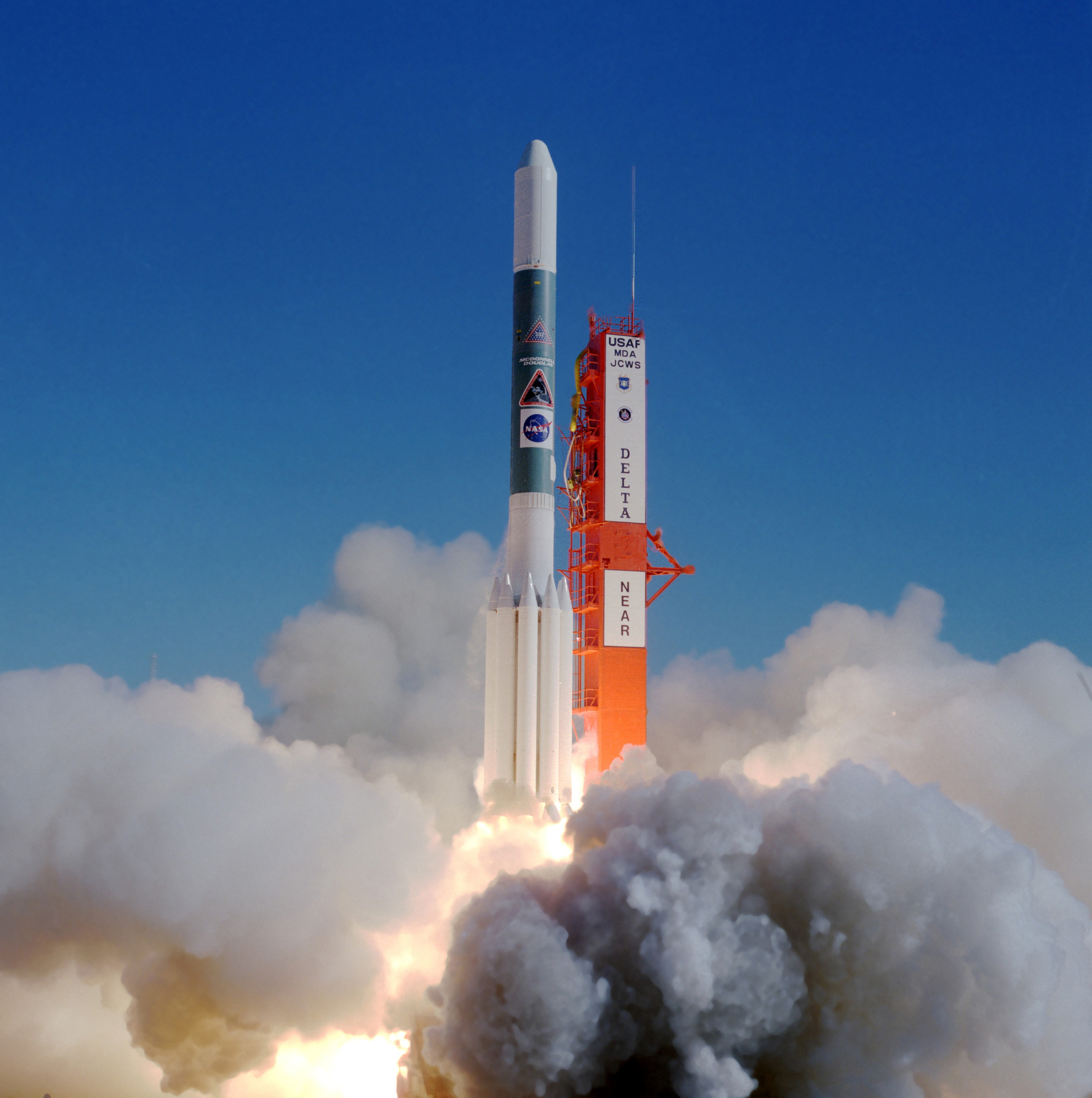
Launch of NEAR, February 1996

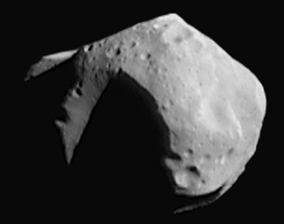
One of the images from the flyby of 253 Mathilde

After launching on a Delta 7925-8 (a Delta II launch vehicle with nine strap-on solid-rocket boosters and a Star 48 (PAM-D) third stage) on February 17, 1996, and exited from Earth orbit, NEAR entered the first part of its cruise phase. NEAR spent most of the cruise phase in a minimal activity "hibernation" state, which ended a few days before the flyby of the 61 km diameter asteroid 253 Mathilde.

On June 27, 1997, NEAR flew by Mathilde within 1200 km at 12:56 UT at 9.93 km/s, returning imaging and other instrument data. The flyby produced over 500 images, covering 60% of Mathilde's surface, as well as gravitational data allowing calculations of Mathilde's dimensions and mass.

=== The journey to Eros ===
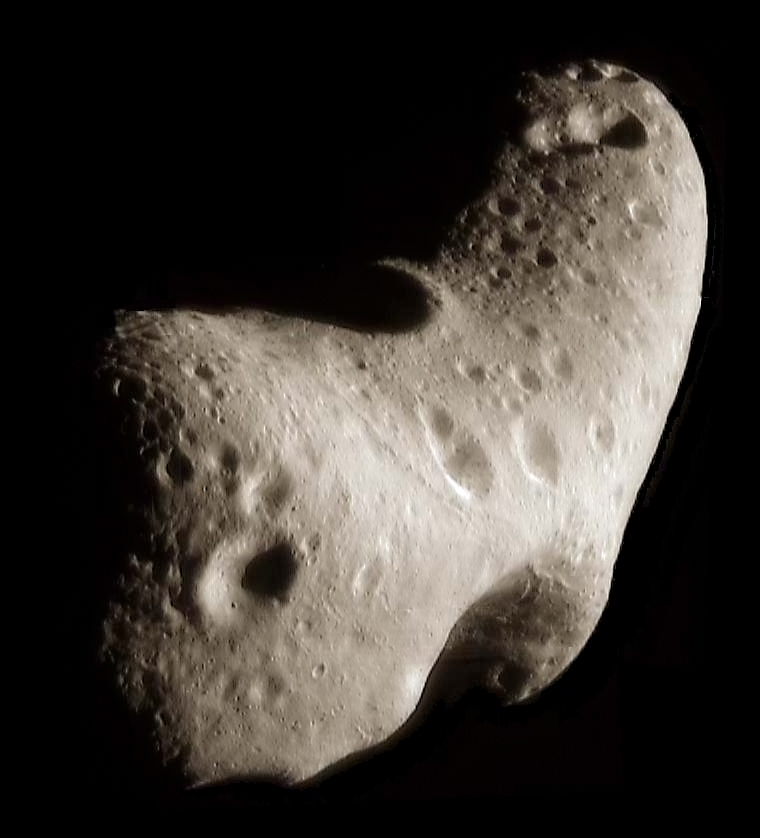
Near-Earth asteroid Eros as seen from the NEAR spacecraft.

On July 3, 1997, NEAR executed the first major deep space maneuver, a two-part burn of the main 450 N thruster. This decreased the velocity by 279 m/s and lowered perihelion from 0.99 AU to 0.95 AU. The Earth gravity assist swingby occurred on January 23, 1998, at 7:23 UT. The closest approach was 540 km, altering the orbital inclination from 0.5 to 10.2 degrees and the aphelion distance from 2.17 to 1.77 AU, nearly matching those of Eros. Instrumentation was active at this time.

=== Failure of first attempt at orbital insertion ===
The first of four scheduled rendezvous burns was attempted on December 20, 1998, at 22:00 UT. The burn sequence was initiated but immediately aborted. The spacecraft subsequently entered safe mode and began tumbling. The spacecraft's thrusters fired thousands of times during the anomaly, which expended 29 kg of propellant, reducing the program's propellant margin to zero. This anomaly almost resulted in the loss of the spacecraft due to a lack of solar orientation and subsequent battery drain. Contact between the spacecraft and mission control could not be established for over 24 hours. The root cause of this incident has not been determined, but software and operational errors contributed to the severity of the anomaly.

The original mission plan called for the four burns to be followed by an orbit insertion burn on January 10, 1999, but the abort of the first burn and loss of communication made this impossible. A new plan was put into effect in which NEAR flew by Eros on December 23, 1998, at 18:41:23 UT at a speed of 965 m/s and a distance of 3827 km from the center of mass of Eros. The camera took images of Eros, data were collected by the near IR spectrograph, and radio tracking was performed during the flyby. A rendezvous maneuver was performed on January 3, 1999, involving a thruster burn to match NEAR's orbital speed to that of Eros. A hydrazine thruster burn took place on January 20 to fine-tune the trajectory. On August 12, a two-minute thruster burn slowed the spacecraft velocity relative to Eros to 300 km/h.

=== Orbital insertion ===
Orbital insertion around Eros occurred on February 14, 2000, at 15:33 UT (10:33 a.m. EST) after NEAR completed a 13-month heliocentric orbit which closely matched the orbit of Eros. A rendezvous maneuver was completed on February 3 at 17:00 UT, slowing the spacecraft from 19.3 to 8.1 m/s relative to Eros. Another maneuver took place on February 8, increasing the relative velocity slightly to 9.9 m/s. Searches for satellites of Eros took place on January 28 and February 4, and 9; none were found. The scans were for scientific purposes and to mitigate any possible collision with a satellite. NEAR went into a 321 × 366 km elliptical orbit around Eros on February 14. The orbit was slowly decreased to a 35 km circular polar orbit by July 14. NEAR remained in this orbit for ten days and then was backed out in stages to a 100 km circular orbit by September 5, 2000. Maneuvers in mid-October led to a flyby of Eros within 5.3 km of the surface at 07:00 UT on October 26.

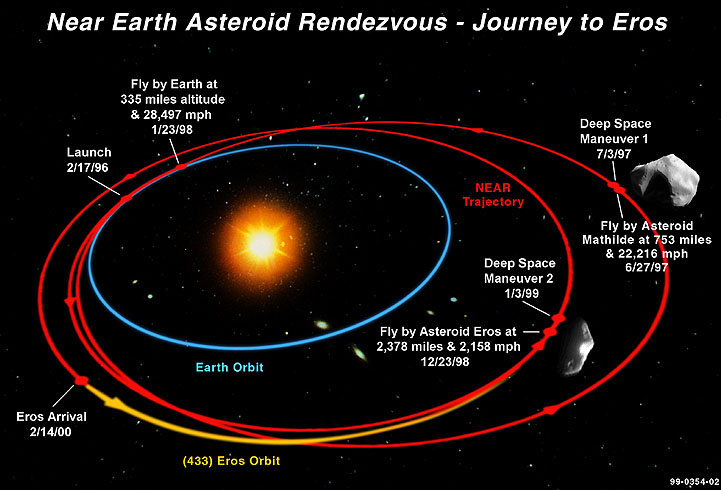
Trajectory graphic depicting the voyage of the NEAR spacecraft

Animation of NEAR Shoemaker's trajectory from February 19, 1996, to February 12, 2001
- NEAR Shoemaker
- Eros
- Earth
- Mathilde
- Sun

Animation of NEAR Shoemaker's trajectory around Eros from April 1, 2000, to February 12, 2001
- NEAR Shoemaker
- 433 Eros

=== Orbits and landing ===
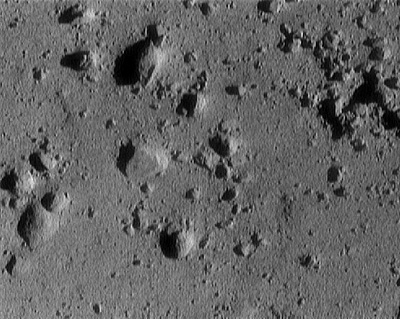
Eros from approximately 250 meters altitude (area in image is roughly 12 meters across). This image was taken during NEAR's descent to the surface of the asteroid.

Following the flyby, NEAR moved to a 200 km circular orbit and shifted the orbit from prograde near-polar to a retrograde near-equatorial orbit. By December 13, 2000, the orbit was shifted back to a circular 35 km low orbit. Starting on January 24, 2001, the spacecraft began a series of close passes (5 to 6 km) to the surface and, on January 28, passed 2 to 3 km from the asteroid. The spacecraft then made a slow controlled descent to the surface of Eros, ending with a touchdown just to the south of the saddle-shaped feature Himeros on February 12, 2001, at approximately 20:01 UT (3:01 p.m. EST). To the surprise of the controllers, the spacecraft was undamaged and operational after the landing at an estimated speed of 1.5 to 1.8 meters per second (thus becoming the first spacecraft to soft-land on an asteroid). After receiving an extension of antenna time on the Deep Space Network, the spacecraft's gamma-ray spectrometer was reprogrammed to collect data on Eros's composition from a vantage point about 4 inches (100 mm) from the surface where it was ten times more sensitive than when it was used in orbit. This increase in sensitivity was in part due to the increased ratio of the signal from Eros compared to the noise generated by the probe itself. The impact of cosmic rays on the sensor was also reduced by about 50%.

At 7:00 p.m. EST on February 28, 2001, the last data signals were received from NEAR Shoemaker before it was shut down. A final attempt to communicate with the spacecraft on December 10, 2002, was unsuccessful. This was likely due to the extreme −173 °C (−279 °F; 100 K) conditions the probe experienced while on Eros.

== Spacecraft and subsystems ==
=== Spacecraft ===
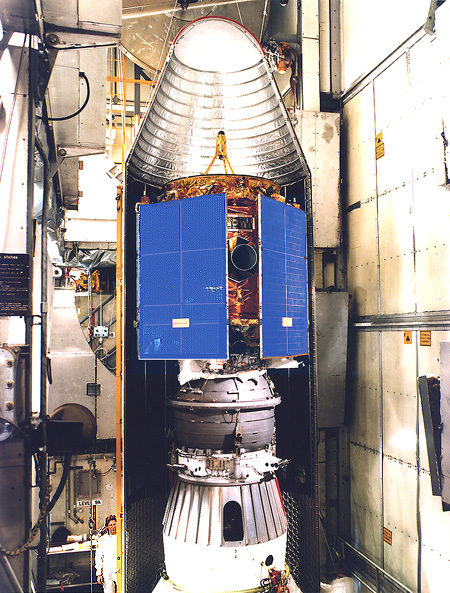
NEAR spacecraft inside its Delta II rocket.

The spacecraft has the shape of an octagonal prism, approximately 1.7 m on a side, with four fixed gallium arsenide solar panels in a windmill arrangement, a fixed 1.5 m X-band high-gain radio antenna with a magnetometer mounted on the antenna feed, and an X-ray solar monitor on one end (the forward deck), with the other instruments fixed on the opposite end (the aft deck). Most electronics were mounted on the inside of the decks. The propulsion module was contained in the interior. The decision to mount instruments on the body of the spacecraft rather than using booms resulted in the gamma-ray spectrometer needing to be shielded from noise generated by the craft. A bismuth germanate shield was used, although this proved only moderately effective.

The craft was three-axis stabilized and used a single bipropellant (hydrazine / nitrogen tetroxide) 450 newton (N) main thruster, and four 21 N and seven 3.5 N hydrazine thrusters for propulsion, for a total delta-V potential of 1450 m/s. Attitude control was achieved using the hydrazine thrusters and four reaction wheels. The propulsion system carried 209 kg of hydrazine and 109 kg of NTO oxidizer in two oxidizer and three fuel tanks.

Power was provided by four 1.8 by 1.2-meter gallium arsenide solar panels, which could produce 400 watts at 2.2 AU (329,000,000 km), NEAR's maximum distance from the Sun and 1800 watts at one AU (150,000,000 km). Power was stored in a 9-amp-hour, 22-cell rechargeable super nickel-cadmium battery.

Spacecraft guidance was achieved through the use of a sensor suite of five digital solar attitude detectors, an inertial measurement unit (IMU), and a star tracker camera pointed opposite the instrument pointing direction. The IMU contained hemispherical resonators gyroscopes and accelerometers. Four reaction wheels (arranged so that any three can provide complete three-axis control) were used for normal attitude control. The thrusters were used to dump angular momentum from the reaction wheels, as well as for rapid slew and propulsive maneuvers. Attitude control was to 0.1 degree, line-of-sight pointing stability is within 50 microradians over one second, and post-processing attitude knowledge is to 50 microradians.

The command and data handling subsystem was composed of two redundant command and telemetry processors and solid state recorders, a power switching unit, and an interface to two redundant 1553 standard data buses for communications with other subsystems. NEAR was the first APL spacecraft to use significant numbers of plastic encapsulated microcircuits (PEMs), and the first to use solid-state data recorders for mass storage—previous APL spacecraft used magnetic tape recorders or magnetic cores.

The solid-state recorders are constructed from 16 Mbit IBM Luna-C DRAMs. One recorder has 1.1 gigabits of storage, and the other has 0.67 gigabits.

The NEAR mission was the first launch of NASA's Discovery Program, a series of small-scale spacecraft designed to proceed from development to flight in under three years for a cost of less than $150 million. The construction, launch, and 30-day cost for this mission is estimated at $122 million. The final total mission cost was $224 million, which consisted of $124.9 million for spacecraft development, $44.6 million for launch support and tracking, and $54.6 million for mission operations and data analysis.

=== Scientific payload and experiments ===
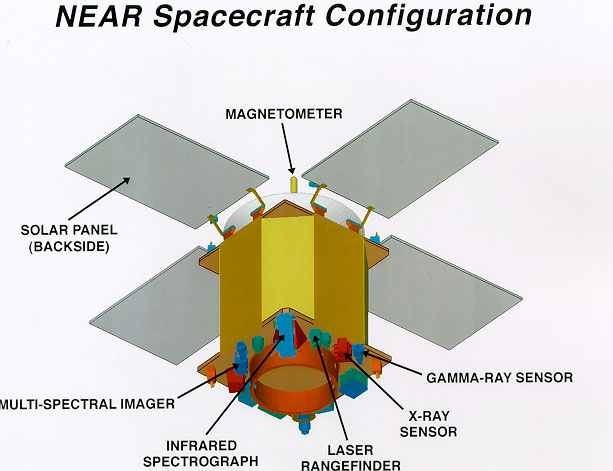
Diagram showing location of NEAR science instruments.

The science payload includes:

- The Multi-Spectral Imager (MSI), designed and built by the Johns Hopkins University Applied Physics Laboratory, provided visible images of the asteroid's surface.
- The NEAR IR Spectrograph (NIS) covers a 0.8 to 2.6-micrometer spectral range in 62 bins.
- A three-axis fluxgate magnetometer supplied by NASA's Goddard Space Flight Center can measure the asteroid's magnetic field from DC to 10 Hz.
- The X-ray/Gamma-Ray Spectrometer (XGRS) is two instruments. The X-ray spectrometer measures X-ray fluorescence on the asteroid excited by solar flare X-rays. The gamma-ray spectrometer is a NaI scintillator with an active BGO shield.
- The laser rangefinder (NLR) is a direct-detection single-pulse rangefinder.
