= 433 Eros =

Near-Earth asteroid

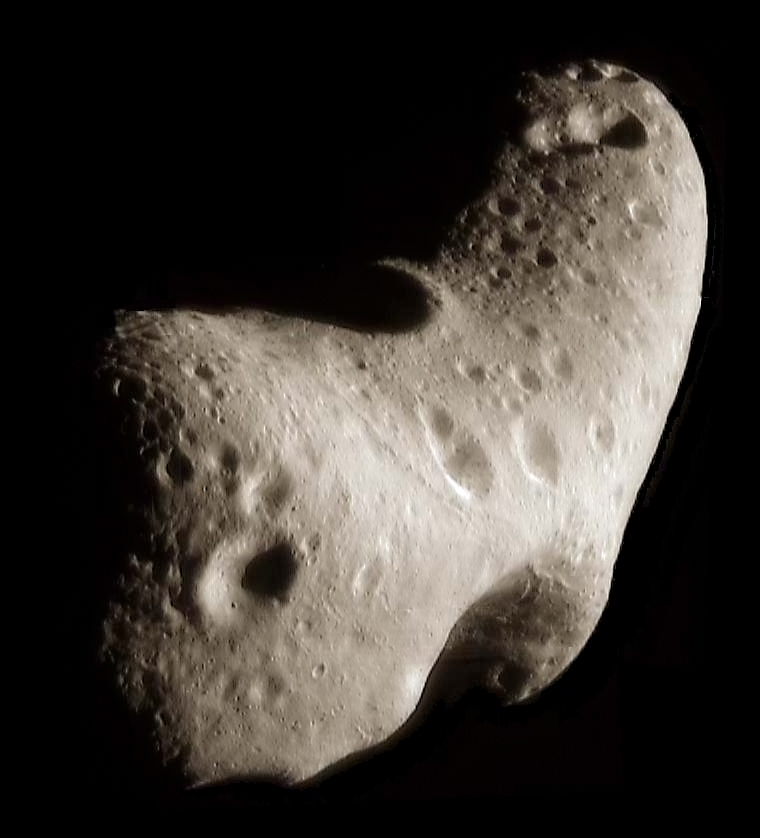
- Eros – colorised composite image of the north polar region, with the craters Psyche above and Himeros below. The long ridge Hinks Dorsum, believed to be a thrust fault, can be seen snaking diagonally between them. The smaller crater in the foreground is Narcissus. Watters, (2011)

Discovery
- Discovered by: C. G. Witt
- Discovery site: Berlin Urania Obs.
- Discovery date: 13 August 1898

Designations
- Pronunciation: /ˈɪərɒs/
- Named after: Ἔρως, Érōs
- Alternative designations: 1898 DQ; 1956 PC
- Minor planet category: NEO; Amor (I); Mars-crosser
- Adjectives: Erotian /ɛˈroʊʃ(i)ən/
- Symbol: (astrological)

Orbital characteristics
- Epoch 4 September 2017 (JD 2458000.5)
- Uncertainty parameter 0
- Observation arc: 53.89 yr (19,683 days)
- Earliest precovery date: 29 October 1893
- Aphelion: 1.7825 AU
- Perihelion: 1.1334 AU
- Semi-major axis: 1.4579 AU
- Eccentricity: 0.2226
- Orbital period (sidereal): 1.76 yr (643 days)
- Mean anomaly: 71.280°
- Mean motion: 0° 33^{m} 35.64^{s} / day
- Inclination: 10.828°
- Longitude of ascending node: 304.32°
- Argument of perihelion: 178.82°
- Earth MOID: 0.1505 AU (58.6 LD)
- Mars MOID: 0.2407 AU

Physical characteristics
- Dimensions: 16.84±0.06 km (mean diameter); 34.4 × 11.2 × 11.2 km
- Mass: (6.687±0.003)×10^{15} kg
- Mean density: 2.67±0.03 g/cm^{3}
- Synodic rotation period: 5.270 h
- Geometric albedo: 0.25±0.06
- Spectral type: S (Tholen); S (SMASS); B–V = 0.921; U–B = 0.531
- Apparent magnitude: 7.0–15
- Absolute magnitude (H): 11.16

433 Eros is a stony asteroid of the Amor group, and the first discovered, and second-largest near-Earth object. It has an elongated shape and a volume-equivalent diameter of approximately 16.8 kilometers (10.4 miles).

The asteroid was discovered by German astronomer C. G. Witt at the Berlin Observatory on 13 August 1898 in an eccentric orbit between Mars and Earth. It was later named after Eros, a god from Greek mythology, the son of Aphrodite, the Greek equivalent of the Roman goddess Venus.

Eros was explored by the NEAR Shoemaker spacecraft from 1998–2001. It was the first near-Earth asteroid to be visited by a spacecraft. At the end of its mission, NEAR landed on the asteroid's surface, marking the first landing on an asteroid.

== History ==
=== Discovery ===
Eros was discovered on 13 August 1898 by Carl Gustav Witt at Berlin Urania Observatory and Auguste Charlois at Nice Observatory and temporarily labeled D.Q. Witt was taking a two-hour exposure of beta Aquarii to secure astrometric positions of asteroid 185 Eunike.

=== Name ===
Eros is named after the Greek god of love, Erōs. It was the first minor planet to be given a male name; the break with earlier tradition was made because it was the first near-Earth asteroid discovered.

=== Later studies ===
During the opposition of 1900–1901, a worldwide program was launched to make parallax measurements of Eros to determine the solar parallax (or distance to the Sun), with the results published in 1910 by Arthur Hinks of Cambridge and Charles D. Perrine of the Lick Observatory, University of California. Perrine published progress reports in 1906 and 1908. He took 965 photographs with the Crossley Reflector and selected 525 for measurement. A similar program was then carried out, during a closer approach, in 1930–1931 by Harold Spencer Jones. The value of the Astronomical Unit (roughly the Earth–Sun distance) obtained by this program was considered definitive until 1968, when radar and dynamical parallax methods started producing more precise measurements.

Eros was the first asteroid detected by the Arecibo Observatory's radar system.

Eros was one of the first asteroids visited by a spacecraft, the first one orbited, and the first one soft-landed on. NASA spacecraft NEAR Shoemaker entered orbit around Eros in 2000, and landed in 2001.

=== Mars-crosser ===
Eros is a Mars-crosser asteroid, the first known to come within the orbit of Mars. Its orbit is inclined at about 10.8° to the solar ecliptic, it is above the plane of the ecliptic when it crosses Mars' orbit, so the two orbits do not intersect. Objects in such an orbit can remain there for only a few hundred million years before the orbit is perturbed by gravitational interactions. Dynamical system modeling suggests that Eros may evolve into an Earth-crosser within as short an interval as two million years, and has a roughly 50% chance of doing so over a time scale of 10^{8}~10^{9} years. It is a potential Earth impactor, about five times more massive than the impactor that created Chicxulub crater and led to the extinction of the non-avian dinosaurs. (Note: Ratio of mean diameters is 16.84 km/~10 km; the volume ratio is approximately 4.8 (cubed value).)

=== NEAR Shoemaker survey and landing ===
The NEAR Shoemaker probe was launched by NASA in 1996, its primary mission being to gather data on Eros. It made a flyby of Eros in 1998, though an aborted engine burn prevented the spacecraft from successfully entering orbit by 1999 as planned. During its flyby, the spacecraft observed over 60% of the asteroid's surface and gathered new data on its size, density, and surface features.

Corrections in Shoemaker's trajectory allowed it to enter orbit around Eros on 14 February 2000. During its orbit, it mapped the global surface of the asteroid, as well as capturing over 160,000 photos. On 12 February 2001, at the end of its mission, it landed on the asteroid's surface using its maneuvering jets, where it soon lost radio contact. Shoemaker's orbit was the first time a near-Earth asteroid was closely visited by a spacecraft.

Animation of NEAR Shoemaker trajectory from 19 February 1996 to 12 February 2001.
- NEAR Shoemaker
- Eros
- Earth
- Mathilde
- Sun
.

Animation of NEAR Shoemaker's trajectory around 433 Eros from 1 April 2000 to 12 February 2001.
NEAR Shoemaker · 433 Eros

== Physical characteristics ==
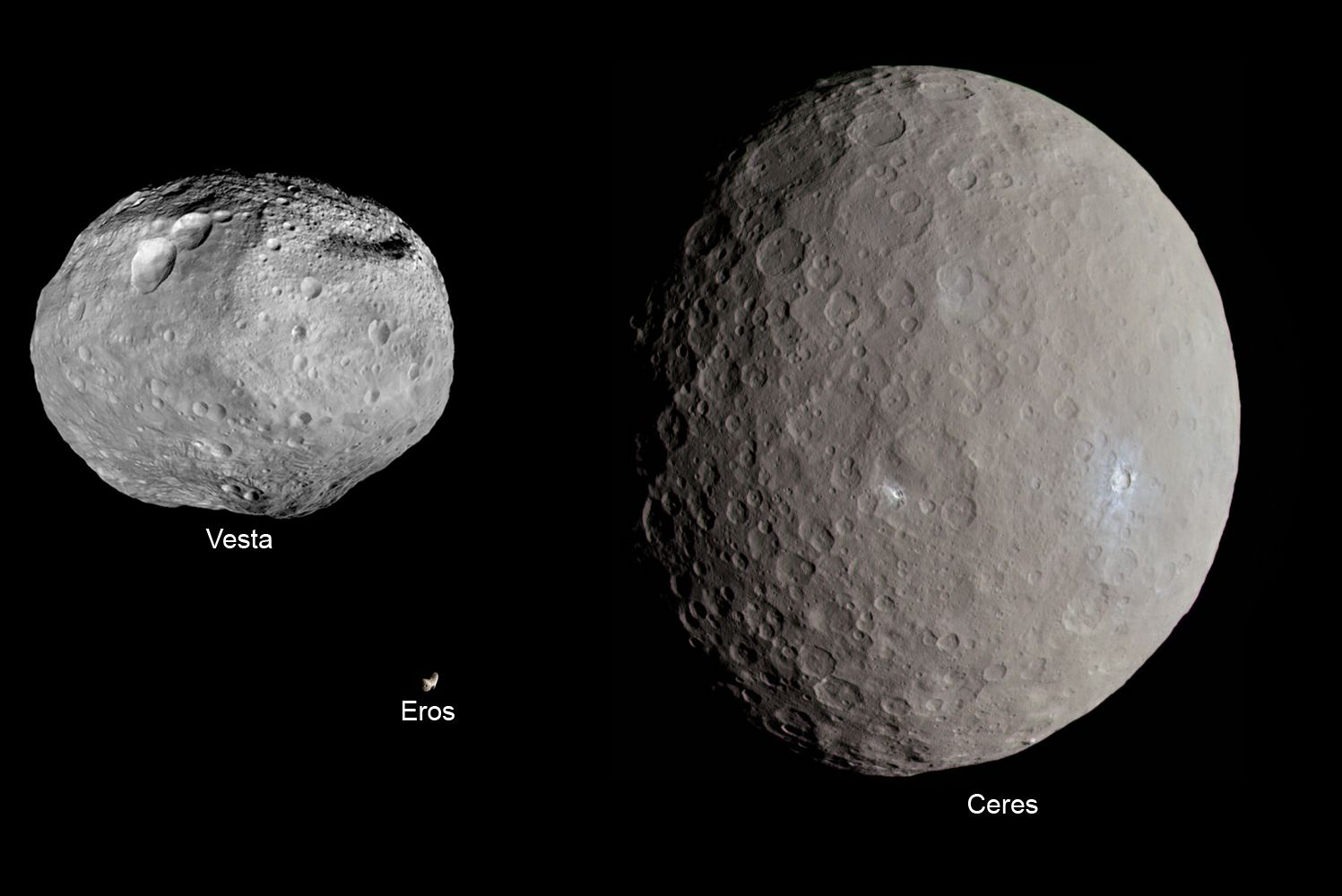
Size comparison of Vesta, Ceres and Eros

Surface gravity depends on the distance from a spot on the surface to the center of a body's mass. Eros's surface gravity varies greatly because Eros is not a sphere but an elongated peanut-shaped object. The daytime temperature on Eros can reach about 100 °C (373 K) at perihelion. Nighttime measurements fall near −150 °C (123 K). Eros's density is 2.67 g/cm^{3}, about the same as the density of Earth's crust.

NEAR scientists have found that most of the larger rocks strewn across Eros were ejected from a single crater in an impact approximately 1 billion years ago. (The crater involved was proposed to be named "Shoemaker", but is not recognized as such by the International Astronomical Union (IAU), and has been formally designated Charlois Regio.) This event may also be responsible for the 40 percent of the Erotian surface that is devoid of craters smaller than 0.5 kilometers across. It was originally thought that the debris thrown up by the collision filled in the smaller craters. An analysis of crater densities over the surface indicates that the areas with lower crater density are within 9 kilometers of the impact point. Some of the lower density areas were found on the opposite side of the asteroid but still within 9 kilometers.

It is thought that seismic shockwaves propagate through the asteroid, shaking smaller craters into rubble. Since Eros is irregularly shaped, parts of the surface antipodal to the point of impact can be within 9 kilometres of the impact point (measured in a straight line through the asteroid) even though some intervening parts of the surface are more than 9 kilometres away in straight-line distance. A suitable analogy would be the distance from the top centre of a bun to the bottom centre as compared to the distance from the top centre to a point on the bun's circumference: top-to-bottom is a longer distance than top-to-periphery when measured along the surface but shorter than it in direct straight-line terms. Compression from the same impact is believed to have created the thrust fault Hinks Dorsum.

A phenomenon named dust ponds were discovered in the asteroid in October 2000. Dust ponds are a phenomenon where pockets of dust are seen in airless celestial bodies. These are smooth deposits of dust accumulated in depressions on the surface of the body (like craters), contrasting from the rocky terrain around them. They typically have different color and albedo compared to the surrounding areas. The asteroid contains many large craters more than 200 m in diameter. Their number is near to the saturation point of these craters. But craters smaller than that are relatively low. Suggesting that some process of erasure has covered them up. The floors of some craters are covered with smooth and flat areas (less than 10° slope). Such dust ponds are characterized by slightly bluer colour compared to the surrounding terrain. 334 of such ponds are identified, with a diameter of 10m. 255 of these are larger than 30m, and 231 (or 91%) are found within 30° from equator.

Data from the Near Earth Asteroid Rendezvous spacecraft collected on Eros in December 1998 suggests that it could contain 20 billion tonnes of aluminum and similar amounts of metals that are rare on Earth, such as gold and platinum.

== Visibility from Earth ==
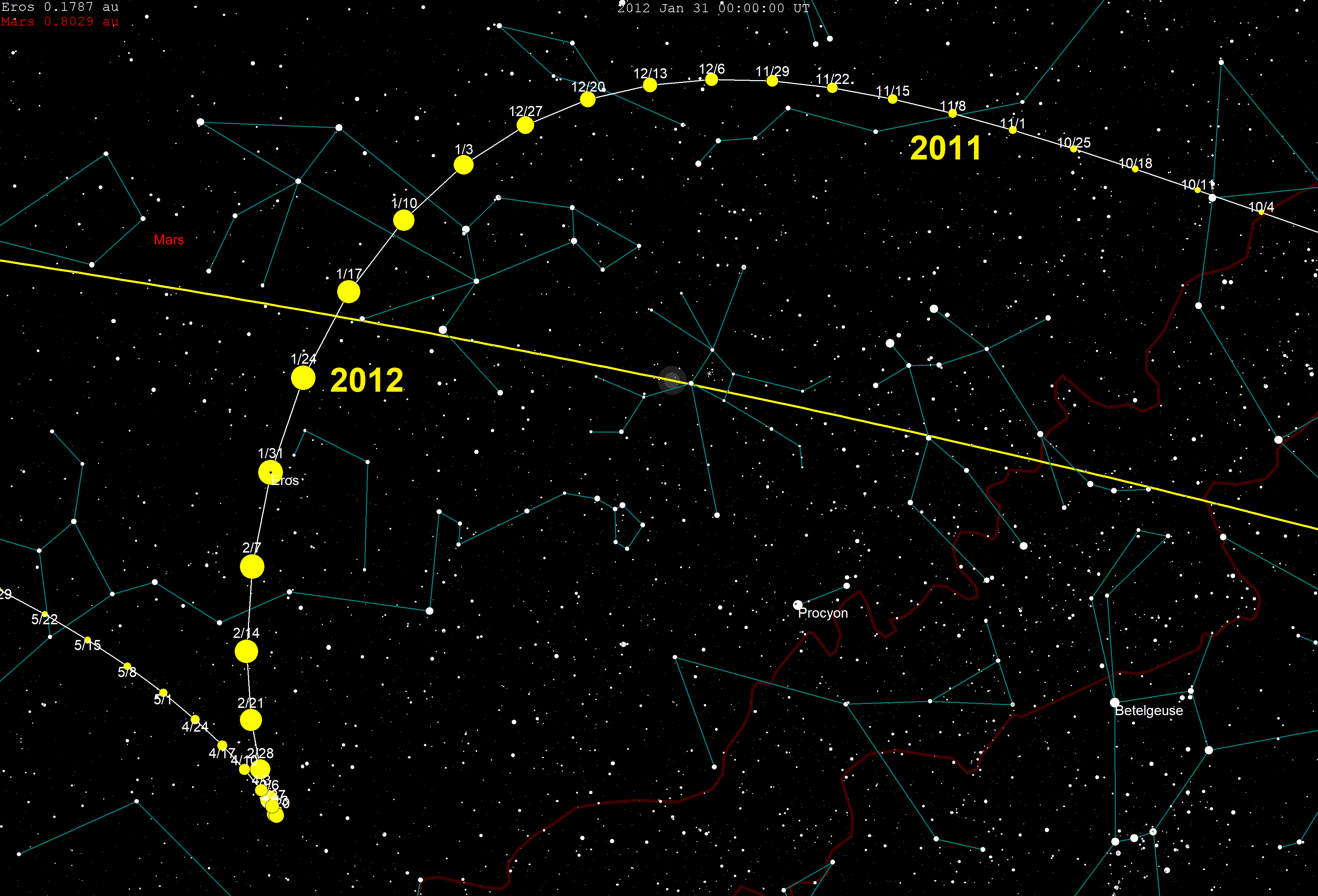
Path in sky during opposition 2011/2012

On 31 January 2012, Eros passed Earth at 0.17867 AU (26,729,000 km; 16,608,000 mi), about 70 times the distance to the Moon, with a visual magnitude of +8.1. During rare oppositions, every 81 years, such as in 1975 and 2056, Eros can reach a magnitude of +7.0, which is brighter than Neptune and brighter than any main-belt asteroid except 1 Ceres, 4 Vesta and, rarely, 2 Pallas and 7 Iris. Under this condition, the asteroid actually appears to stop, but unlike the normal condition for a body in heliocentric conjunction with Earth, its retrograde motion is very small. For example, in January and February 2137, it moves retrograde only 34 minutes in right ascension.

== Gallery ==
Animation of the rotation of Eros

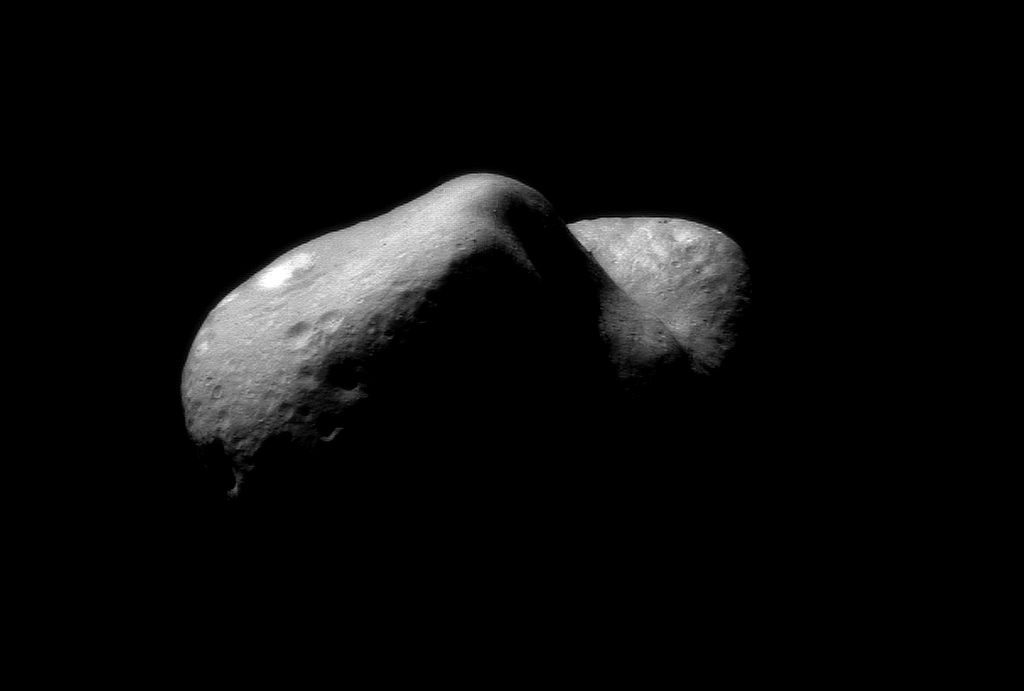
View from one end of Eros across the gouge on its side towards the opposite end

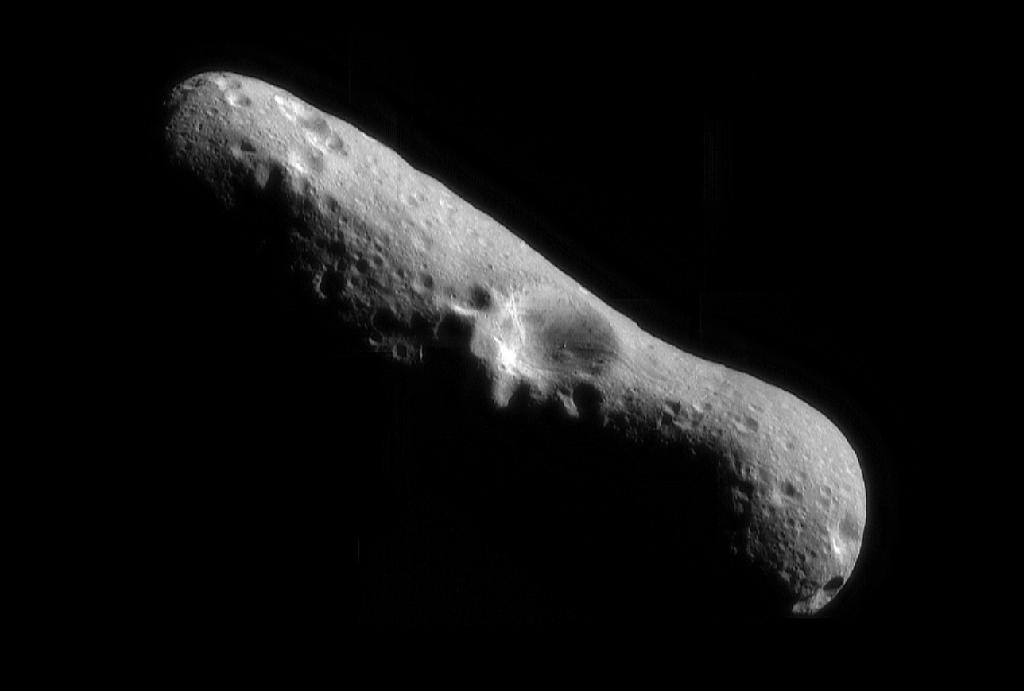
First mosaic image of Eros taken from an orbiting spacecraft

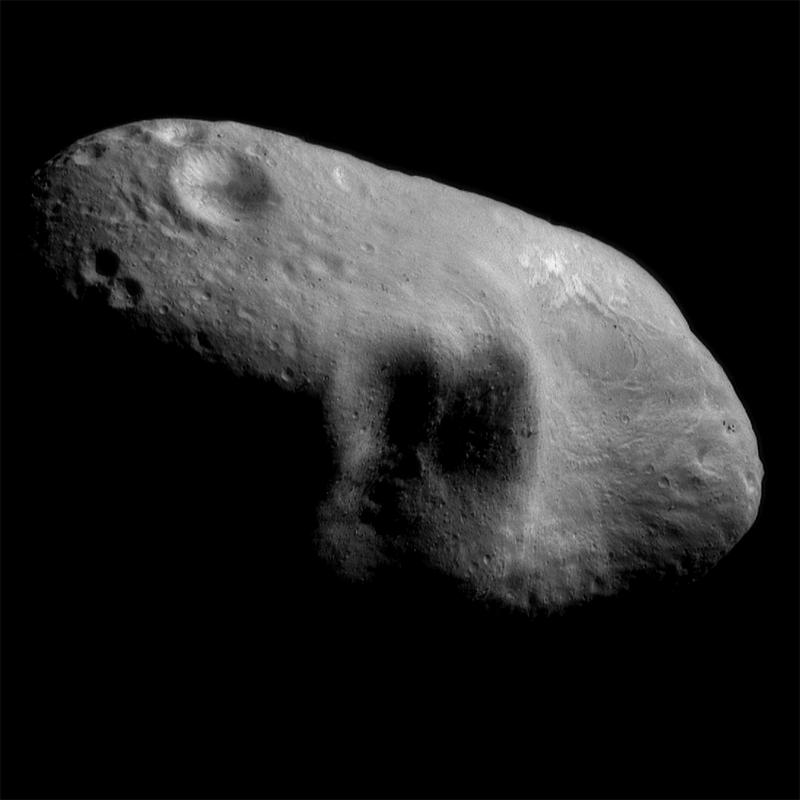
Mosaic image of Eros

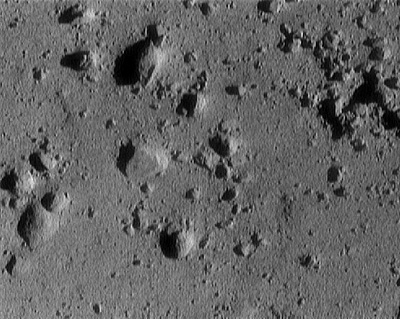
Regolith of Eros, seen during NEAR's descent; area shown is about 12 meters (40 feet) across

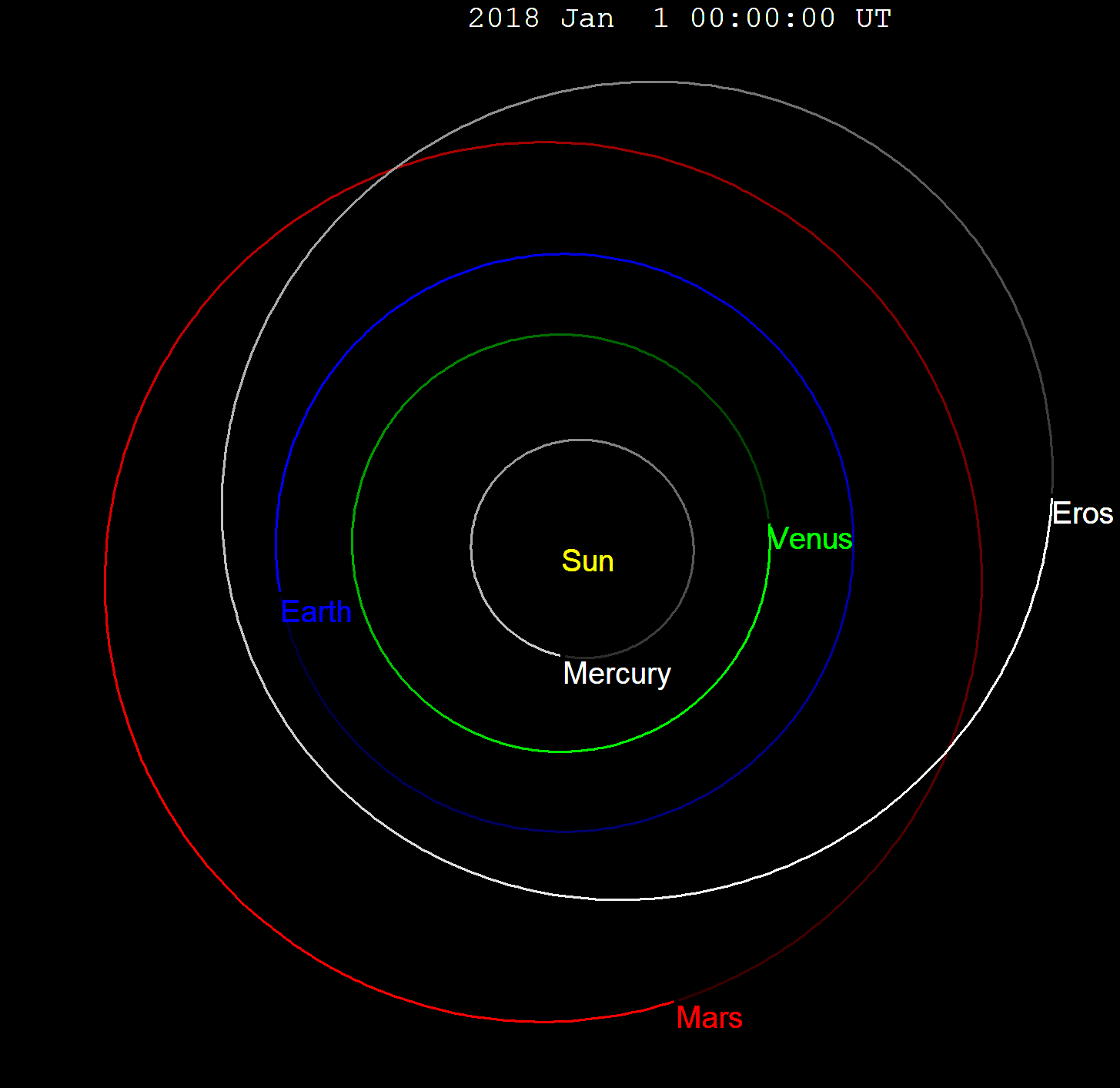
Orbital diagram of Eros with locations on 1 January 2018

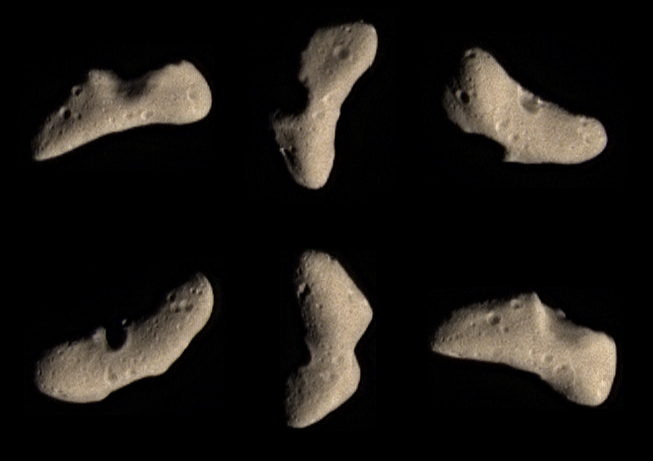
Six views of Eros in approximate natural color from NEAR-Shoemaker in February 2000

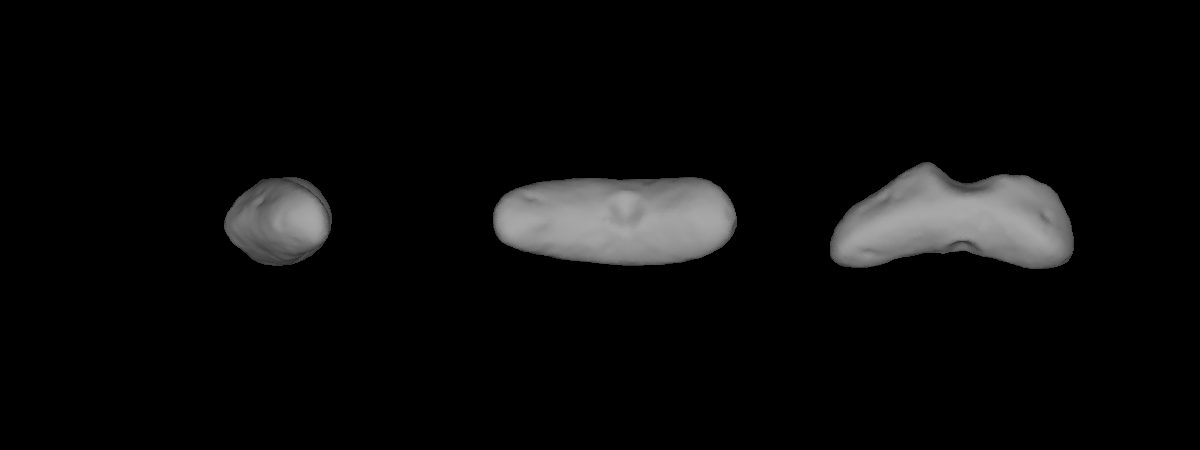
3D-model of 433 Eros from the NEAR-Shoemaker Multi-Spectral Imager.

== See also ==
- List of geological features on 433 Eros
- Lists of astronomical objects
