= 253 Mathilde =

Main-belt asteroid

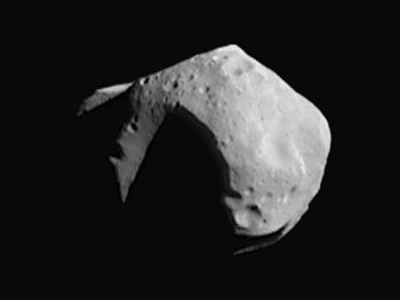
- Mathilde photographed by the NEAR Shoemaker spacecraft on 27 June 1997

Discovery
- Discovered by: Johann Palisa
- Discovery site: Vienna Obs.
- Discovery date: 12 November 1885

Designations
- Pronunciation: /məˈtɪldə/
- Named after: Mathilde Loewy
- Alternative designations: A885 VA; 1915 TN; 1949 OL_{1}
- Minor planet category: main-belt (middle)

Orbital characteristics
- Epoch 9 June 2026 (JD 2461200.5)
- Uncertainty parameter 0
- Aphelion: 3.347 AU
- Perihelion: 1.947 AU
- Semi-major axis: 2.647 AU
- Eccentricity: 0.2643
- Orbital period (sidereal): 4.31 yr (1,573 d)
- Mean anomaly: 273.534°
- Mean motion: 0° 13^{m} 43.948^{s} / day
- Inclination: 6.740°
- Longitude of ascending node: 179.494°
- Argument of perihelion: 157.564°
- Known satellites: 0

Proper orbital elements
- Proper semi-major axis: 2.648 AU
- Proper eccentricity: 0.219
- Proper inclination: 6.54°
- Proper mean motion: 83.5361 deg / yr
- Proper orbital period: 4.30951 yr (1574.05 d)
- Precession of perihelion long.: 52.8 arcsec / yr
- Precession of asc. node: −63.3 arcsec / yr

Physical characteristics
- Dimensions: 66 km × 48 km × 46 km
- Mean diameter: 52.8±2.6 km
- Volume: 78000+12000 −11000 km^{3}
- Mass: (1.033±0.044)×10^{17} kg
- Mean density: 1.3±0.2 g/cm^{3}
- Equatorial surface gravity: 0.00989 m/s^{2}
- Sidereal rotation period: 17.406 ± 0.010 d (417.74 ± 0.24 h)
- Geometric albedo: 0.047±0.005
- Temperature: ≈ 174 K
- Spectral type: Cb
- Absolute magnitude (H): 10.35

253 Mathilde is an asteroid in the intermediate asteroid belt, approximately 50 kilometers in diameter, that was discovered by Austrian astronomer Johann Palisa at Vienna Observatory on 12 November 1885. It has a relatively elliptical orbit that requires more than four years to circle the Sun. This tumbling asteroid has an unusually slow rate of rotation, requiring 17.4 days to complete a 360° revolution about its axis. It is a primitive C-type asteroid, which means the surface has a high proportion of carbon; giving it a dark surface that reflects only 4% of the light that falls on it.

Mathilde was visited by the NEAR Shoemaker spacecraft during June 1997, on its way to asteroid 433 Eros. During the short flyby, the spacecraft imaged a hemisphere of the asteroid, revealing many large craters that had gouged out depressions in the surface. It was the first carbonaceous asteroid to be explored and, until 21 Lutetia was visited in 2010, it was the largest asteroid to be visited by a spacecraft.

== Observation history ==
In 1880, Johann Palisa, the director of the Austrian Naval Observatory (538), was offered a position as an assistant at the newly completed Vienna Observatory. Although the job represented a demotion for Johann, it gave him access to the new 27-inch (690 mm) refractor, the largest telescope in the world at that time. By this point Johann had already discovered 27 asteroids, and he would employ the Vienna 27-inch (690 mm) and 12-inch (300 mm) instruments to find an additional 94 asteroids before he retired.

Among his discoveries was the asteroid 253 Mathilde, found on 12 November 1885. The initial orbital elements of the asteroid were then computed by V. A. Lebeuf, another Austrian astronomer working at the Paris Observatory. The name of the asteroid was suggested by Lebeuf, after Mathilde, the wife of Moritz Loewy—who was the vice director of the observatory in Paris.

In 1995, ground-based observations determined that Mathilde is a C-type asteroid. It was also found to have an unusually long period of rotation of 418 hours.

== Characteristics ==
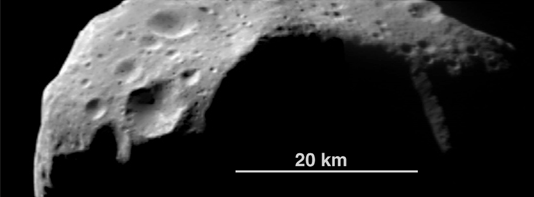
Damodar, a 20 km-wide crater on Mathilde

Mathilde is very dark, with an albedo comparable to fresh asphalt, and is thought to share the same composition as CI1 or CM2 carbonaceous chondrite meteorites, with a surface dominated by phyllosilicate minerals. The asteroid has a number of extremely large craters, with the individual craters being named for coal fields and basins around the world. The two largest craters, Ishikari (29.3 km) and Karoo (33.4 km), are as wide as the asteroid's average radius. The impacts appear to have spalled large volumes off the asteroid, as suggested by the angular edges of the craters. Uniformity in brightness and colour were visible in the craters and there was no appearance of layering, so the asteroid's interior must be very homogeneous. There are indications of material movement along the downslope direction. It has a very slow rotation, at 17.4 days, possibly due to the impacts which created the craters.

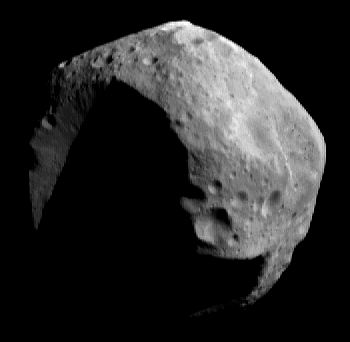
Up-close image of Mathilde, showing its cratered surface.

The density measured by NEAR Shoemaker, 1,300 kg/m^{3}, is less than half that of a typical carbonaceous chondrite; this may indicate that the asteroid is very loosely packed rubble pile. The same is true of several C-type asteroids studied by ground-based telescopes equipped with adaptive optics systems (45 Eugenia, 90 Antiope, 87 Sylvia and 121 Hermione). Up to 50% of the interior volume of Mathilde consists of open space. However, the existence of a 20-km-long scarp may indicate that the asteroid does have some structural strength, so it could contain some large internal components. The low interior density is an inefficient transmitter of impact shock through the asteroid, which also helps to preserve the surface features to a high degree.

Mathilde's orbit is eccentric, taking it to the outer reaches of the belt. Nonetheless, the orbit lies entirely between the orbits of Mars and Jupiter; it does not cross the planetary orbits. It also has one of the slowest rotation periods of the known asteroids—most asteroids have a rotation period in the range of 2–24 hours. Because of the slow rotation rate, NEAR Shoemaker was only able to photograph 60% of the asteroid's surface. The slow rate of rotation may be accounted for by a satellite orbiting the asteroid, but a search of the NEAR images revealed none larger than 10 km in diameter out to 20 times the radius of Mathilde.

Image sequence of Mathilde during NEAR Shoemaker's flyby

== Exploration ==
On 27 June 1997, the NEAR Shoemaker spacecraft passed within 1,212 km of Mathilde while moving at a velocity of 9.93 km/s. This close approach allowed the spacecraft to capture over 500 images of the surface, and provided data for more accurate determinations of the asteroid's dimensions and mass (based on gravitational perturbation of the spacecraft). However, only one hemisphere of Mathilde was imaged during the fly-by.

== See also ==
- List of craters on 253 Mathilde
