= Atmosphere of the Moon =

Very scant presence of gases around the Moon

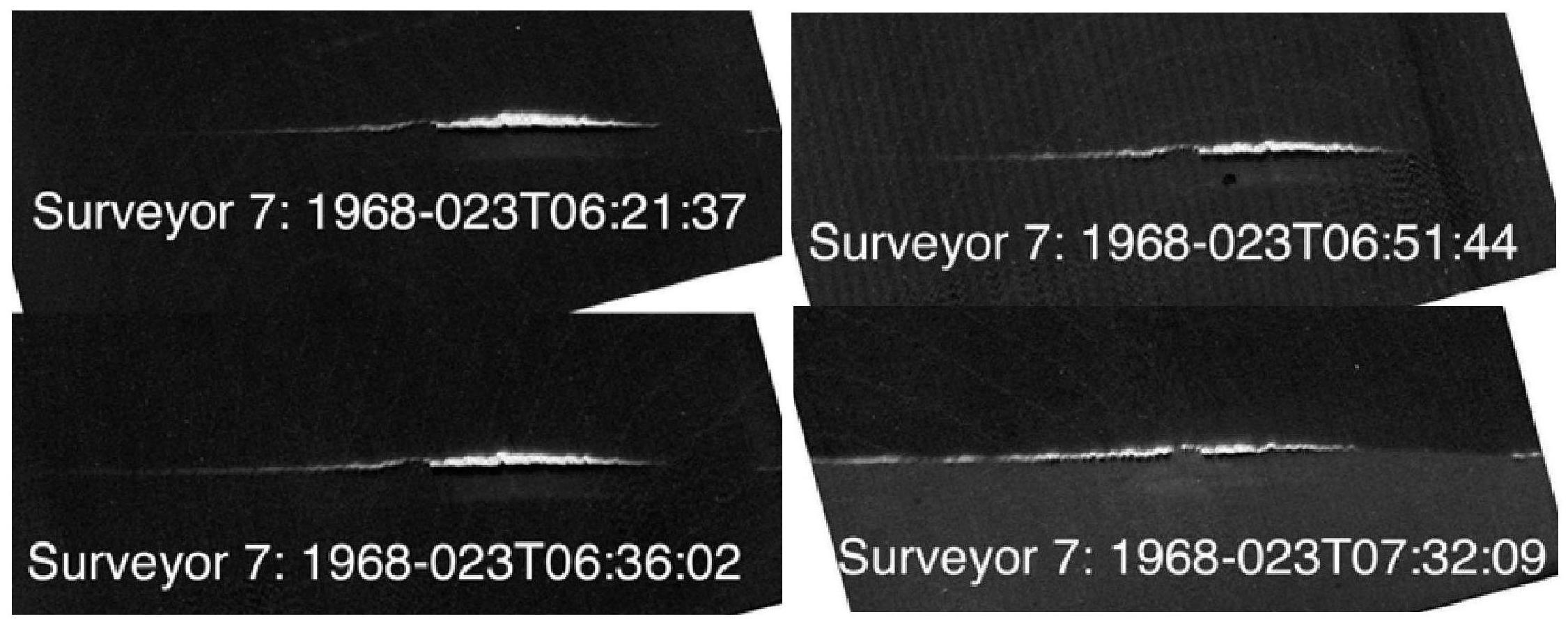
Surveyor 7 observes levitating dust, a phenomenon named Lunar horizon glow

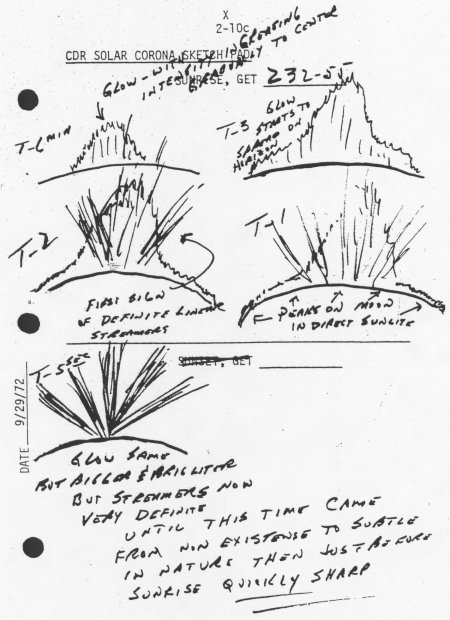
The thin lunar atmosphere is visible on the Moon's surface at sunrise and sunset with the lunar horizon glow and lunar twilight rays, like Earth's crepuscular rays. This Apollo 17 sketch depicts the glow and rays among the general zodiacal light.

The atmosphere of the Moon is very sparse layer, consisting only of an exosphere. For most practical purposes, the Moon is considered to be surrounded by vacuum. The elevated presence of atomic and molecular particles in its vicinity compared to interplanetary medium, referred to as "lunar atmosphere" for scientific objectives, is negligible in comparison with the gaseous envelopes surrounding Earth and most planets of the Solar System, and comparable to their exospheres. The pressure of this small mass is around 3×10^{−15} atm (0.3 nPa), varying throughout the day, and has a total mass of less than 10 metric tonnes. Otherwise, the Moon is considered not to have an atmosphere because it cannot absorb measurable quantities of radiation, does not appear layered or self-circulating, and requires constant replenishment due to the high rate at which its gases are lost into space.

Roger Joseph Boscovich was the first modern astronomer to argue for the lack of atmosphere around the Moon in his De lunae atmosphaera (1753).

== Sources ==
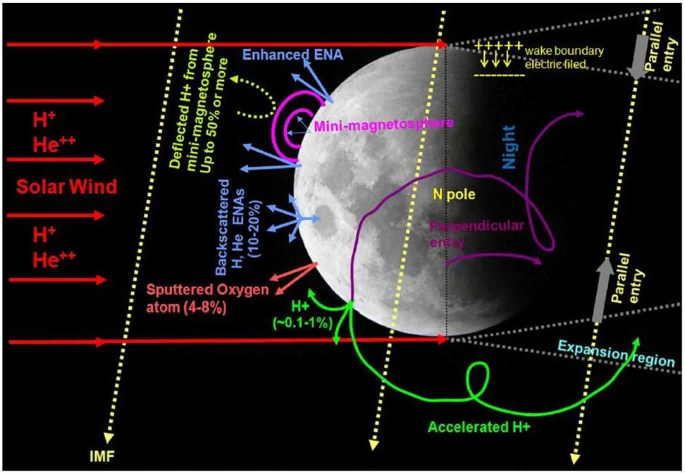
"Overview of the processes known to occur around the Moon and on its surface, owing to interaction with the solar wind (from Bhardwaj et al. 2015)"

One source of the lunar atmosphere is outgassing: the release of gases such as radon and helium resulting from radioactive decay within the crust and mantle. Another important source is the bombardment of the lunar surface by micrometeorites, the solar wind, and sunlight, in a process known as sputtering.

== Escape velocity and atmospheric hold ==
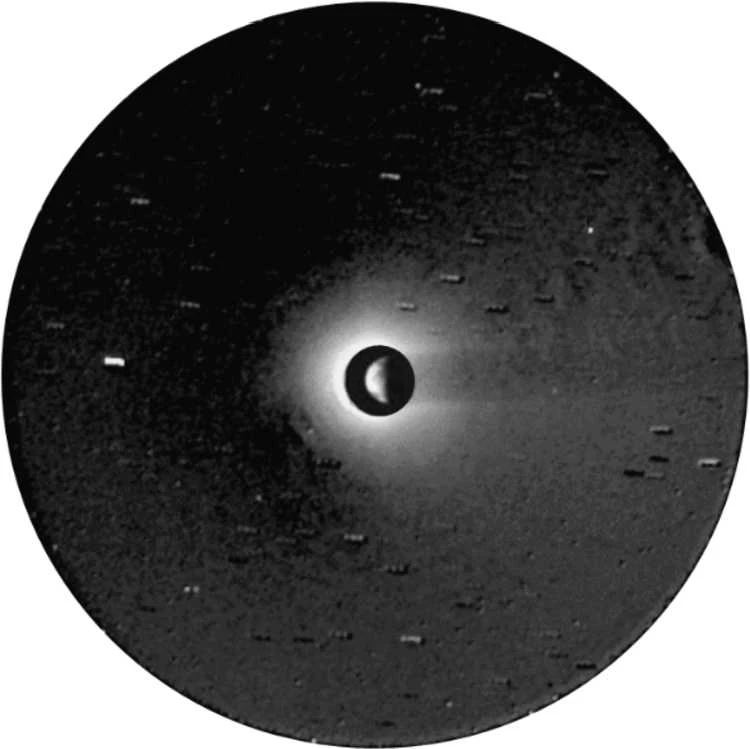
Image of the lunar sodium exosphere over a 7° field of view.

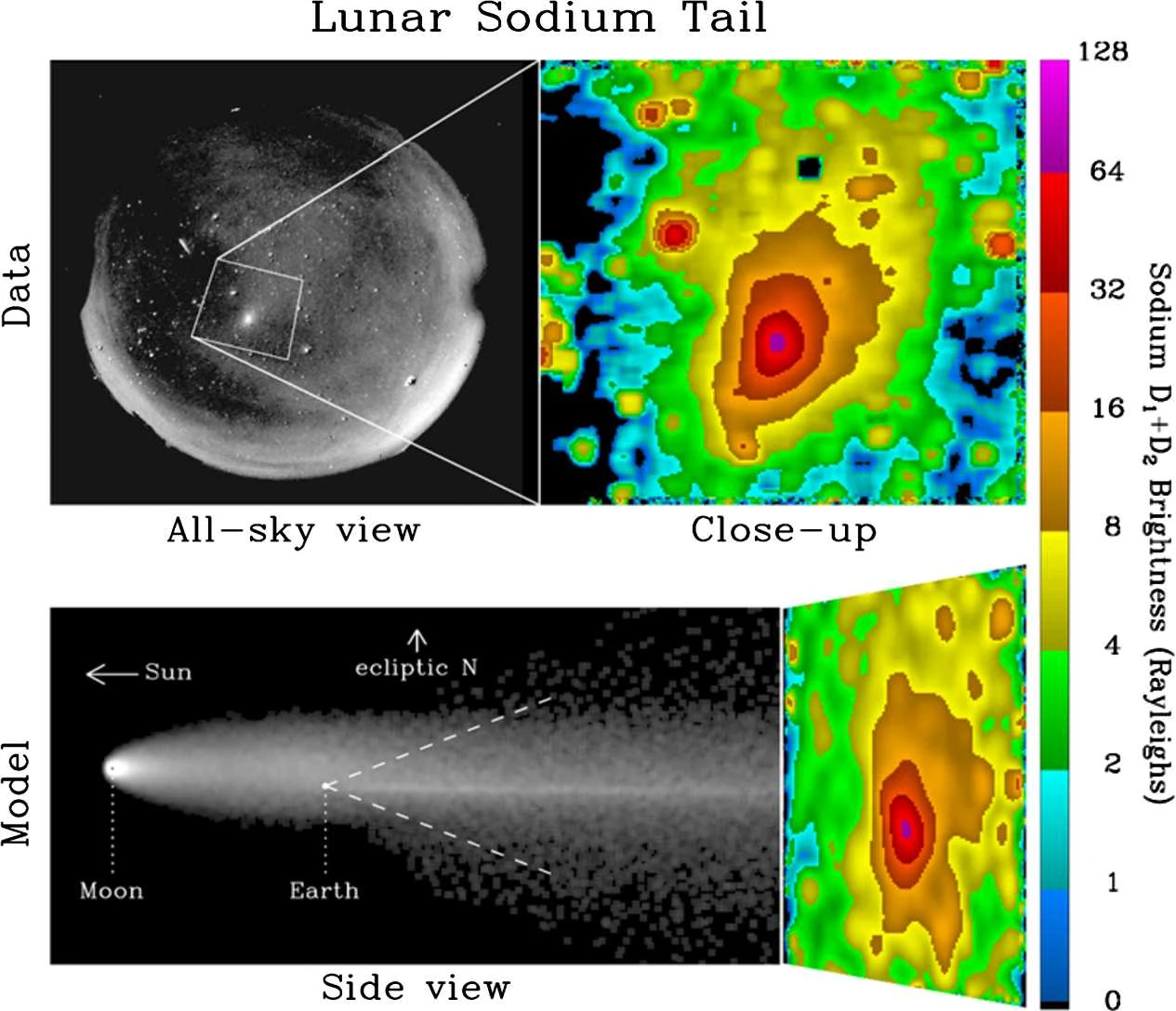
Observations and modelling of the Moon's sodium tail "spot".

Gases can:

- be re-implanted into the regolith as a result of the Moon's gravity;
- escape the Moon entirely if the particle is moving at or above the lunar escape velocity of 2.38 km/s (1.48 mi/s), or 5,328 mph (8,575 km/h);
- be lost to space either by solar radiation pressure or, if the gases are ionized, by being swept away in the solar wind's magnetic field.

== Composition ==
What little atmosphere the Moon has consists of some unusual gases, including sodium and potassium, which are not found in the atmospheres of Earth, Mars, or Venus. At sea level on Earth, each cubic centimeter of the atmosphere contains approximately 10^{19} molecules; by comparison the lunar atmosphere contains fewer than 10^{6} molecules in the same volume. On Earth, this is considered to be a very good vacuum. In fact, the density of the atmosphere at the Moon's surface is comparable to the density of some of the outermost fringes of Earth's atmosphere, where the International Space Station orbits.

The elements sodium and potassium have been detected in the Moon's atmosphere using Earth-based spectroscopic methods, whereas the isotopes radon-222 and polonium-210 have been inferred from data obtained by the Lunar Prospector alpha particle spectrometer. Argon-40, helium-4, oxygen and/or methane (CH_{4}), nitrogen (N_{2}) and/or carbon monoxide (CO), and carbon dioxide (CO_{2})) were detected by in-situ detectors placed by the Apollo astronauts.

The average daytime abundances of the elements known to be present in the lunar atmosphere, in atoms per cubic centimeter, are as follows:

- Argon: 20,000–100,000
- Helium: 5,000–30,000
- Neon: up to 20,000
- Sodium: 70
- Potassium: 17
- Hydrogen: fewer than 17

This yields approximately 80,000 total atoms per cubic centimeter, marginally higher than the quantity posited to exist in the atmosphere of Mercury. While this greatly exceeds the density of the solar wind, which is usually on the order of just a few protons per cubic centimeter, it is virtually a vacuum in comparison with the atmosphere of the Earth.

The Moon may also have a tenuous "atmosphere" of electrostatically levitated dust. See Lunar soil for more details.

== Ancient atmosphere ==
In October 2017, NASA scientists at the Marshall Space Flight Center and the Lunar and Planetary Institute in Houston announced their finding, based on studies of Moon magma samples retrieved by the Apollo missions, that the Moon had once possessed a relatively thick atmosphere for a period of 70 million years between 3 and 4 billion years ago. This atmosphere, sourced from gases ejected from lunar volcanic eruptions, was twice the thickness of that of present-day Mars. It has been theorized that this ancient atmosphere could have supported life, though no evidence of life has been found. The ancient lunar atmosphere was eventually stripped away by the solar wind and dissipated into space.

== See also ==
- Atmosphere of Mercury
- Exosphere
- Lunar Atmosphere and Dust Environment Explorer (LADEE)
- Orders of magnitude (pressure)
- Sodium tail of the Moon
