= Dust ponds =

Astronomical phenomenon observed in airless bodies

Dust ponds are a phenomenon where pockets of dust are seen in celestial bodies without a significant atmosphere, like asteroids, comets and some minor planets. These are smooth deposits of dust accumulated in depressions on the surface of the body (like craters), contrasting from the rocky terrain around them. They typically have different color and albedo compared to the surrounding areas. As there are no air around them, their method of formation is still debated. The phenomenon was discovered on 2000 October 28, by the spaceprobe NEAR Shoemaker on Asteroid 433 Eros.

== Cause ==
On airless bodies, electrostatic transport is believed to be the leading cause of dust transport. Infrared rays and ultraviolet rays from the Sun are strong enough to knock electrons off the dust present on surface. These positively charged particles get repelled from the surface kilometers high. On the night side, the dust is negatively charged by electrons from the solar wind. Particles at the night side would achieve greater electrical tension differences than the day side, launching dust particles to even higher altitudes. Laboratory experiments show that dusty surfaces tend to become smooth as a result of dust mobilization. When these levitated dust travels into a shadowed region, they lose their charge and fall to the ground. Over time, dust accumulate on such places. This is believed to be the leading cause of Dust ponds. However, the precise mechanics of electrostatic dust launching remain mysterious. The high obliquity of Eros (88°) results in low latitudes spending more time with the Sun near the horizon than higher latitudes. This results in more dust ponds in the equatorial region. Electrostatically levitated dust is believed to be the cause of a phenomenon named lunar horizon glow, where such particles scatter sunlight during lunar sunset, creating a shining horizon.

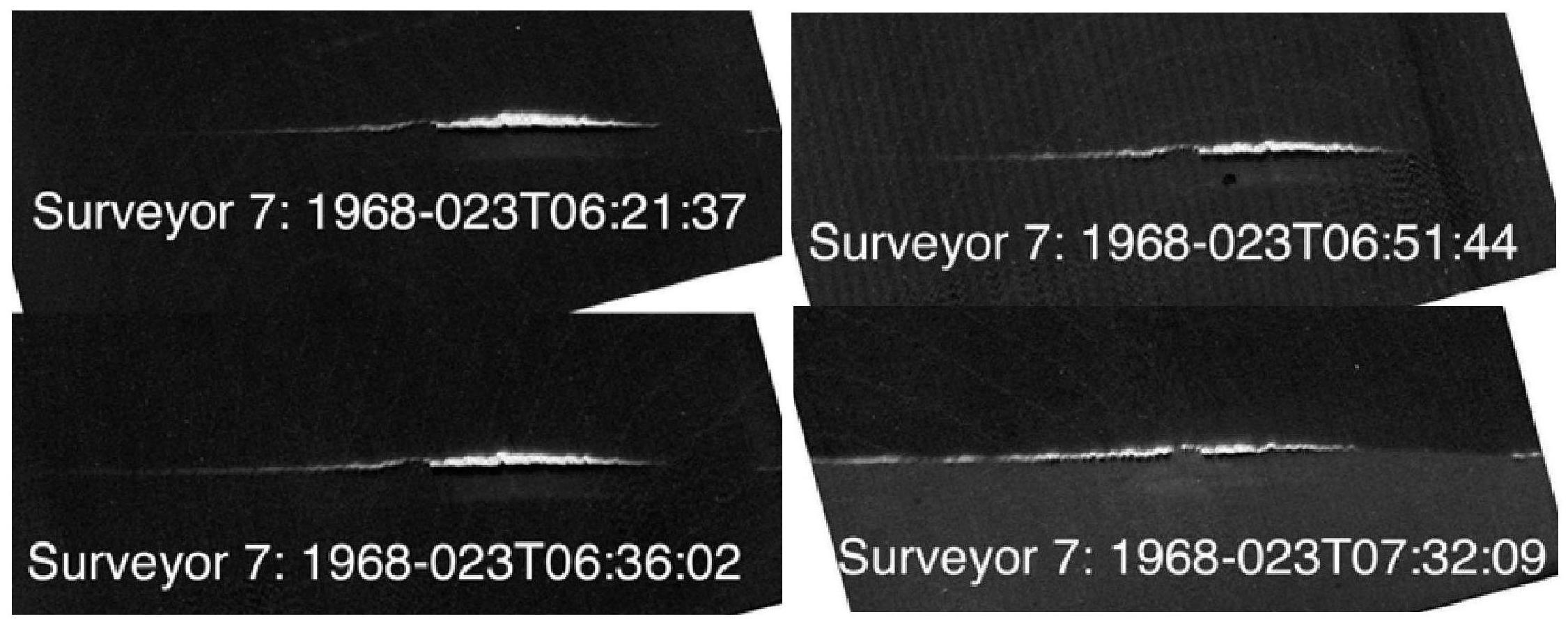
Levitated particles causing Lunar horizon glow. Photo taken by Surveyor 7 mission.

Apart from this, seismic shaking, outgassing, and fluidization is also believed to be the cause, although all of these theories contain some flaws. Fluidization of impact ejecta is believed to be the cause of structures named melt pools on moon. This results is two types of dust ponds, that of impact melt (type 1) and that of (Dust accumulation). Type 1 ponds are located near the impact melt of large craters. The dust is uniformly distributed across the crater floor, producing smooth pond surfaces with a constant slope and shallow depth. The dust ponds however, have a less constant slope. Type 2 ponds are rare on the Moon because more electrostatic tension is needed to overcome the gravitational pull of the moon. In asteroids with low gravity, less electrostatic difference is needed, resulting in more type-2 dust ponds.

The variation in albedo is thought to be due to mineral heterogeneity, or the difference in grain size. The material is distributed in the crater with a slight offset in the geometric center. Particles in the dust ponds are also rich in Silicate materials (olivine and pyroxenes). The slight blue color of the pond deposits is due to a property of mafic materials that makes them visibly bluer at very fine grain sizes (≤50 μm) due to changes in packing. Overall, ponds are formed in planetary bodies with dry brittle regolith or low volatile content.

== Examples ==
433 Eros contains an abundance of large craters more than 200m in diameter. Their number is near to the saturation point of these craters. But craters smaller than that are relatively low. Suggesting that some process of erasure has covered them up. The floors of some craters are covered with smooth and flat areas (less than 10° slope). Such ponds are observed more near the equator and places with low gravity. They are characterized by slightly bluer colour compared to the surrounding terrain. 334 of such ponds are identified, with a diameter of 10m. 255 of these are larger than 30m, and 231 (or 91%) are found within 30° from the equator. Only 24 of them have clearly flat floors with a change in slope at the edges, and only 12 of them have level topography along both east–west and north–south directions. Dust particles here measure about 2 cm in size.

The dust pond features on Eros are thought to be from dry regolith materials, while that of found in the moon are thought to come from ejecta melt. On the surface of asteroid 4 Vesta both type 1 (ejecta) and type 2 (dust ponds) have been found within 0˚–30°N/S, that is in the equatorial region. 10 craters have been identified on Vesta with dust pond formation. These craters have a diameter of ≤11 km and half of them are scattered in the southern region of the Marcia (average ~75.3 ± 32 km distance from rim) and northern part of Cornelia crater. These craters were photographed in detail by the DAWN probe that orbited Vesta.

In the Sagamihara and Muses-Sea regions of asteroid 25143 Itokawa, dust ponds were identified by Japanese probe Hayabusa. Dust particles here are finer than that of 433 Eros with size varying from millimeters to less than a centimeter.

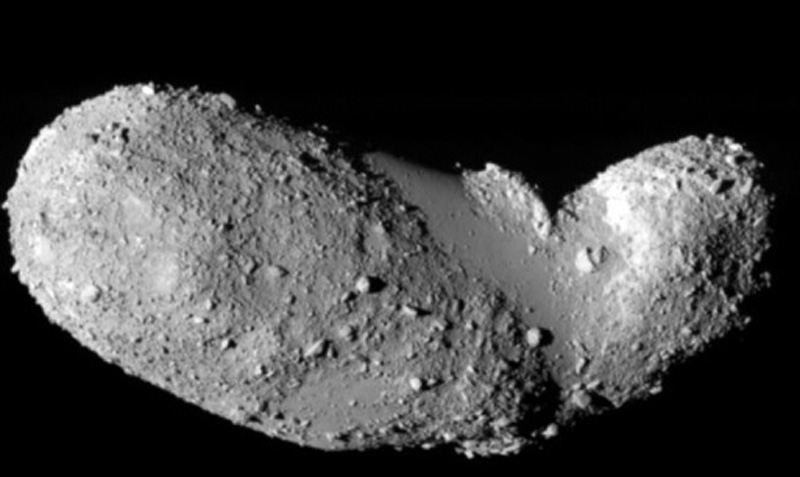
Asteroid Itokawa photographed by the Hayabusa probe. We can see a smooth patch of dust in the middle, the Muses-Sea region. The region contains dust ponds.

== See also ==
- Lunar horizon glow
