= Lunar horizon glow =

Glow seen in Lunar sky during Sunset

Lunar horizon glow is a phenomenon in which dust particles in the Moon's thin atmosphere create a glow during lunar sunset. The Surveyor program provided the first data and photos of the phenomenon. Astronauts in lunar orbit observed it during the Apollo 15 and Apollo 17 missions.

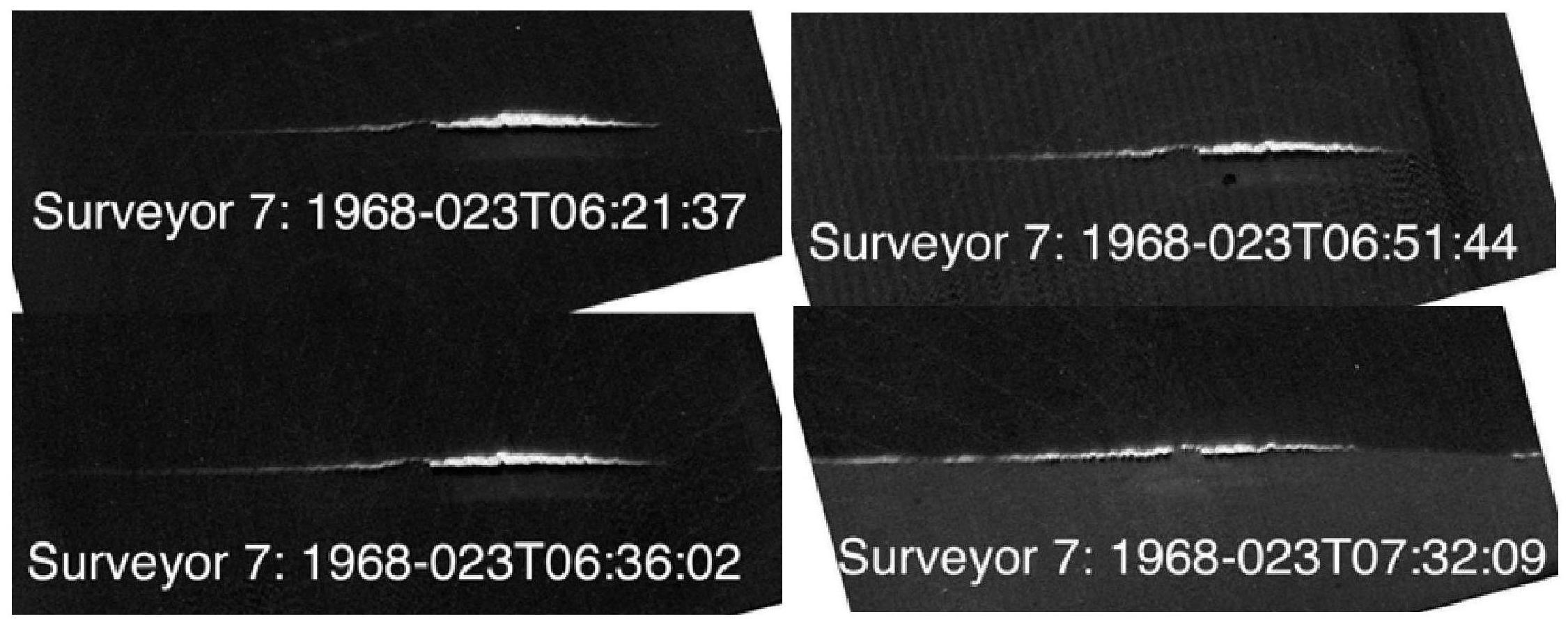
Lunar horizon glow as observed by Surveyor 7 mission.

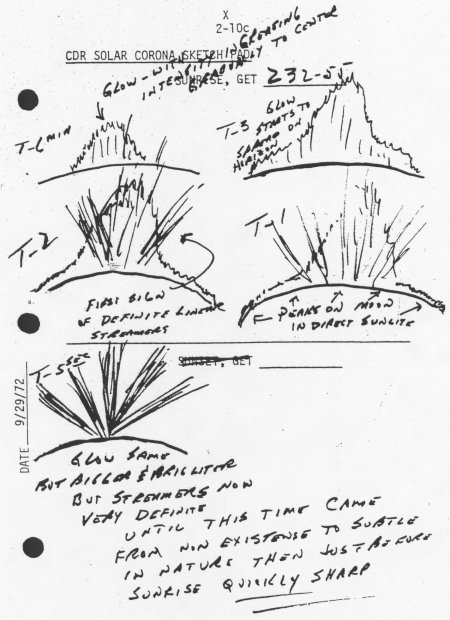
The thin lunar atmosphere is visible on the Moon's surface at sunrise and sunset with the lunar horizon glow and lunar twilight rays, like Earth's crepuscular rays. This Apollo 17 sketch by Eugene Cernan depicts the glow and rays among the general zodiacal light.

== Cause ==
Dust kicked off from the surface of the Moon will stay in the atmosphere for around 3 hours. Apart from this, electrically charged particles could be levitated by electrostatic fields with a strength of >500 V cm^{−1}. This cloud of dust, near the lunar terminator line, forward scatters the light, creating a glow near the horizon during lunar sunset. Dust particles 10 micrometers in diameter are thought to rise over 10 km from the lunar surface. The levitation mechanism is thought to eject 10 million more particles per unit time into the cloud than those caused by micrometeoroid impacts. The term "Moon fountain" has been used to describe this effect.

During the lunar day, infrared rays and ultraviolet rays from the Sun are strong enough to knock electrons off the dust present on lunar surface. These positively charged particles get repelled from the surface kilometers high. On the night side, the dust is negatively charged by electrons from the solar wind. Particles at the night side achieve greater electrical tension differences than the day side, launching dust particles to even higher altitudes. This dust eventually falls back to the surface, and the cycle repeats.

In celestial bodies without any significant atmosphere, electrostatic transport is believed to be the leading cause of dust transport. Laboratory experiments show that dusty surfaces tend to become smooth as a result of dust mobilization. This phenomenon is thought to explain the process of dust ponds in the asteroids 433 Eros and comet 67P/Churyumov–Gerasimenko.

Strange glowing lights on the Moon are recorded from Earth for centuries. This phenomenon, known as "transient lunar phenomena", is now generally accepted to be visible evidence of meteoroids impacting the lunar surface. But others with an amorphous reddish or whitish glows or even as dusky hazy regions that change shape or disappear over seconds or minutes, are thought to be because of sunlight reflecting from suspended lunar dust.

In 1956, this effect was anticipated by science fiction author Hal Clement in his short story "Dust Rag", published in Astounding Science Fiction.

== Exploration ==
Coronal photographs of the Moon from Apollo 15 and 17 showed excessive brightness. The glow was also observed by astronauts in lunar orbit during sunrise for about 10 seconds. Such rays were also reported by astronauts aboard Apollo 8 and Apollo 10. These might have been similar to crepuscular rays on Earth. The glow is also believed to appear in the star tracker data from the Clementine mission, although it would be masked by coronal and zodiacal light. The Apollo missions placed laser retroreflectors on the lunar surface. The dust is believed to be the cause of the degradation of the instruments. Apollo 17 also placed an experiment on the Moon's surface called LEAM (Lunar Ejecta and Meteorites). It looked for dust kicked up by small meteoroids hitting the Moon's surface, and recorded the speed, energy, and direction of tiny particles. LEAM saw a large increase in the number of particles every morning, coming from the east or west and slower than speeds expected for lunar ejecta. The experiment's temperature increased to near 100 degrees Celsius a few hours after each lunar sunrise, so the unit had to be turned off temporarily to prevent overheating. It is thought that this is a result of electrically charged moondust sticking to LEAM, darkening its surface so the experiment package absorbed rather than reflected sunlight. Scientists were unable to make a definite explanation of the problem, as LEAM operated only briefly before the Apollo program ended.

On 20 July 2011, scientists performed experiments with the Lunar Reconnaissance Orbiter Camera (LROC) to attempt to detect a weak signal of lunar horizon glow. The experiment was done jointly with the Lyman-Alpha Mapping Project (LAMP), Narrow Angle Camera (NAC), and Wide Angle Camera (WAC). Both of these captured pictures with long exposure times over 50 times longer than their normal exposure times. During the experiment, the Lunar Reconnaissance Orbiter was positioned in a way that it shadowed the Sun by the Moon and was looking back across space to observe material. The NAC found a glow of 0.03 DN, and the lunar horizon was found to have a glow of 0.2 DN. A spectral radiance of 0.01 W/m^{2}/sr/um was predicted to be detected by the NAC. So for the given observing geometry, the lunar horizon glow must be dimmer than 0.01 W/m^{2}/sr/um.

== See also ==
- Dust ponds
- Atmosphere of the Moon
- Lunar soil
