= 25143 Itokawa =

Potentially hazardous near-Earth asteroid in the Apollo group

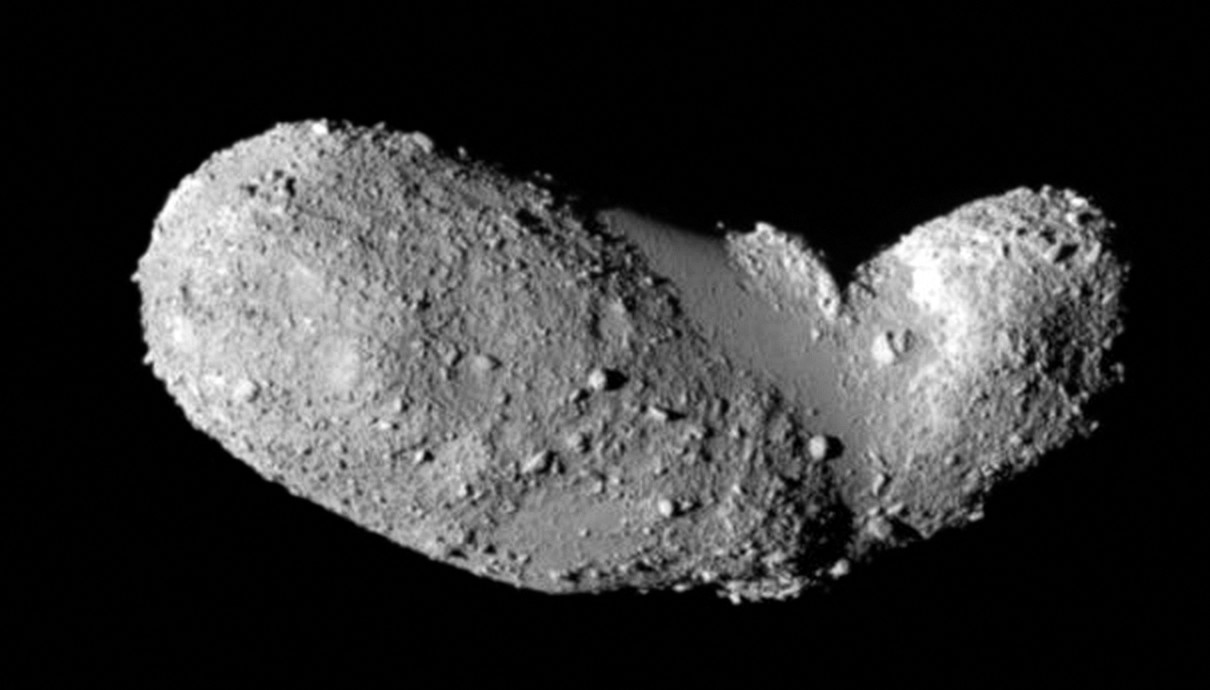
- Image of Itokawa from the Hayabusa spacecraft

Discovery
- Discovered by: LINEAR
- Discovery site: Lincoln Lab's ETS
- Discovery date: 26 September 1998

Designations
- Pronunciation: /ˌiːtoʊˈkɑːwə/ Japanese: [itoꜜkawa]
- Named after: Hideo Itokawa
- Alternative designations: 1998 SF_{36}
- Minor planet category: Apollo; NEO; PHA

Orbital characteristics
- Epoch 27 April 2019 (JD 2458600.5)
- Uncertainty parameter 0
- Observation arc: 20.38 yr (7,443 d)
- Aphelion: 1.6951 AU
- Perihelion: 0.9532 AU
- Semi-major axis: 1.3241 AU
- Eccentricity: 0.2801
- Orbital period (sidereal): 1.52 yr (557 d)
- Mean anomaly: 288.88°
- Mean motion: 0° 38^{m} 48.48^{s} / day
- Inclination: 1.6214°
- Longitude of ascending node: 69.081°
- Argument of perihelion: 162.82°
- Earth MOID: 0.0131 AU (5.10 LD)

Physical characteristics
- Dimensions: 535 m × 294 m × 209 m
- Mean diameter: 313 m 330 m 350 m
- Mass: (3.51±0.105)×10^{10} kg (3.58±0.18)×10^{10} kg
- Mean density: 1.9±0.13 g/cm^{3} 1.95±0.14 g/cm^{3}
- Synodic rotation period: 12.132 h
- Geometric albedo: 0.23; 0.283±0.116; 0.36±0.22; 0.53
- Spectral type: SMASS = S (IV) Sqw; S; Q
- Absolute magnitude (H): 18.61 · 18.95 (R); 19.00 · 19.2; 19.48 · 19.51±0.09

25143 Itokawa (provisional designation 1998 SF_{36}) is a sub-kilometer near-Earth object of the Apollo group and also a potentially hazardous asteroid. It was discovered by the LINEAR program in 1998 and later named after Japanese rocket engineer Hideo Itokawa. The peanut-shaped S-type asteroid has a rotation period of 12.1 hours and measures approximately 330 meters (1,100 feet) in diameter. Due to its low density and high porosity, Itokawa is considered to be a rubble pile, consisting of numerous boulders of different sizes rather than of a single solid body.

It was the first asteroid to be the target of a sample-return mission, of the Japanese space probe Hayabusa, which collected more than 1500 regolith dust particles from the asteroid's surface in 2005. Since its return to Earth in 2010, the mineralogy, petrography, chemistry, and isotope ratios of these particles have been studied in detail, providing insights into the evolution of the Solar System. Itokawa was the smallest asteroid to be photographed and visited by a spacecraft prior to the DART mission to Dimorphos in 2022.

== Discovery and naming ==
Itokawa was discovered on 26 September 1998 by astronomers with the Lincoln Near-Earth Asteroid Research (LINEAR) program at Lincoln Laboratory's Experimental Test Site near Socorro, New Mexico, in the United States. It was given the provisional designation 1998 SF_{36}. The body's observation arc begins with its first observation by the Sloan Digital Sky Survey just one week prior to its official discovery observation. The minor planet was named in memory of Japanese rocket scientist Hideo Itokawa (1912–1999), who is regarded as the father of Japanese rocketry. The official naming citation was published by the Minor Planet Center on 6 August 2003 (M.P.C. 49281).

== Orbit and classification ==
Itokawa belongs to the Apollo asteroids. They are Earth-crossing asteroids and the largest dynamical group of near-Earth objects with nearly 10,000 known members. Itokawa orbits the Sun at a distance of 0.95–1.70 AU once every 18 months (557 days; semi-major axis of 1.32 AU). Its orbit has an eccentricity of 0.28 and an inclination of 2° with respect to the ecliptic. It has a low Earth minimum orbital intersection distance of 0.0131 AU (1,960,000 km), which corresponds to 5.1 lunar distances.

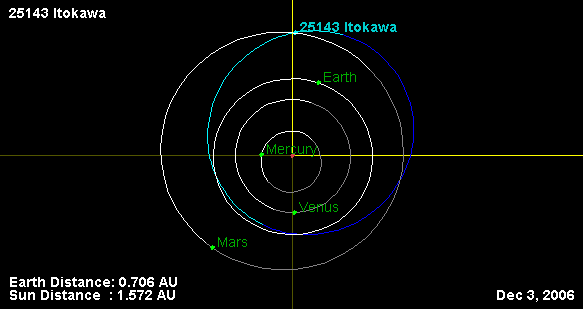
Left: orbital diagram of Itokawa in December 2006. Right: animated orbits of Itokawa (green), Earth (blue), and Mars (orange), around the Sun.

== Exploration ==
This artist's impression, based on detailed spacecraft observations, shows the strange peanut-shaped asteroid Itokawa.

In 2000, it was selected as the target of Japan's Hayabusa mission. The probe arrived in the vicinity of Itokawa on 12 September 2005 and initially "parked" in an asteroid–Sun line at 20 km (12 mi), and later 7 km (4.3 mi), from the asteroid (Itokawa's gravity was too weak to provide an orbit, so the spacecraft adjusted its orbit around the Sun until it matched the asteroid's). Hayabusa landed on 20 November for thirty minutes, but it failed to operate a device designed to collect soil samples. On 25 November, a second landing and sampling sequence was attempted. The sample capsule was returned to Earth and landed at Woomera, South Australia on 13 June 2010, around 13:51 UTC (23:21 local). On 16 November 2010, the Japan Aerospace Exploration Agency reported that dust collected during Hayabusa's voyage was indeed from the asteroid.

=== Surface features ===
Names of major surface features were proposed by Hayabusa scientists and accepted by the Working Group for Planetary System Nomenclature of the International Astronomical Union. Also, the Hayabusa science team is using working names for smaller surface features. The following tables list the names of geological features on the asteroid. No naming conventions have been disclosed for surface features on Itokawa.

==== Craters ====
Ten impact craters on the surface of Itokawa were named on 18 February 2009.

Crater	Coordinates	Diameter (km)	Approval Date	Named After	Ref
Catalina	17°S 14°E	0.02	2009	Catalina Station (astronomical observatory) in Arizona, United States	WGPSN
Fuchinobe	34°N 91°W	0.04	2009	Fuchinobe in Sagamihara, Japan	WGPSN
Gando	76°S 155°W	n.a.	2009	Gando, Canary Islands; Spanish launch facility	WGPSN
Hammaguira	18°S 155°W	0.03	2009	Hammaguir, Algeria; abandoned French launch site and missile testing range in the Sahara desert	WGPSN
Kamisunagawa	28°S 45°E	0.01	2009	Kamisunagawa, town in Hokkaido Japan, where a microgravity test facility is located	WGPSN
Kamoi	6°N 116°W	0.01	2009	Japanese town of Kamoi in Yokohama, location of the NEC Toshiba Space Systems Ltd. factory	WGPSN
Komaba	10°S 102°E	0.03	2009	Komaba in Meguro, Japan, where the Institute of Space and Astronautical Science is located	WGPSN
Laurel	1°N 162°E	0.02	2009	U.S. city of Laurel in Maryland, where APL/JHU is located	WGPSN
Miyabaru	40°S 116°W	0.09	2009	Radar site of the Uchinoura Space Center in Japan	WGPSN
San Marco	28°S 41°W	n.a.	2009	San Marco platform, an old oil platform near Kenya that served as a launch pad for Italian spacecraft	WGPSN

==== Regiones ====
Regiones (singular: regio) are large area marked by reflectivity or color distinctions from adjacent areas in planetary geology. The following regiones have been named on Itokawa.

Regio	Coordinates	Diameter (km)	Approval Date	Named After	Ref
Arcoona Regio	28°N 202°E	0.16	18 Feb. 2009	Arcoona, Australia	WGPSN
LINEAR Regio	40°S 232°E	0.12	18 Feb. 2009	Lincoln Near-Earth Asteroid Research	WGPSN
MUSES-C Regio	70°S 60°E	0.3	2006	MUSES-C, name of the Hayabusa probe prior to launch	WGPSN
Ohsumi Regio	33°N 207°E	0.14	18 Feb. 2009	Ōsumi Peninsula	WGPSN
Sagamihara Regio	80°N 15°E	0.23	2006	Sagamihara, a town in Japan where Institute of Space and Astronautical Science is located	WGPSN
Uchinoura Regio	40°N 90°E	0.07	2006	Uchinoura, a town in Japan (now part of Kimotsuki), the location of Uchinoura Space Center, Hayabusa launch site	WGPSN
Yoshinobu Regio	39°S 117°E	0.16	18 Feb. 2009	Launch site in the Tanegashima Space Center, Japan	WGPSN

== Physical characteristics ==
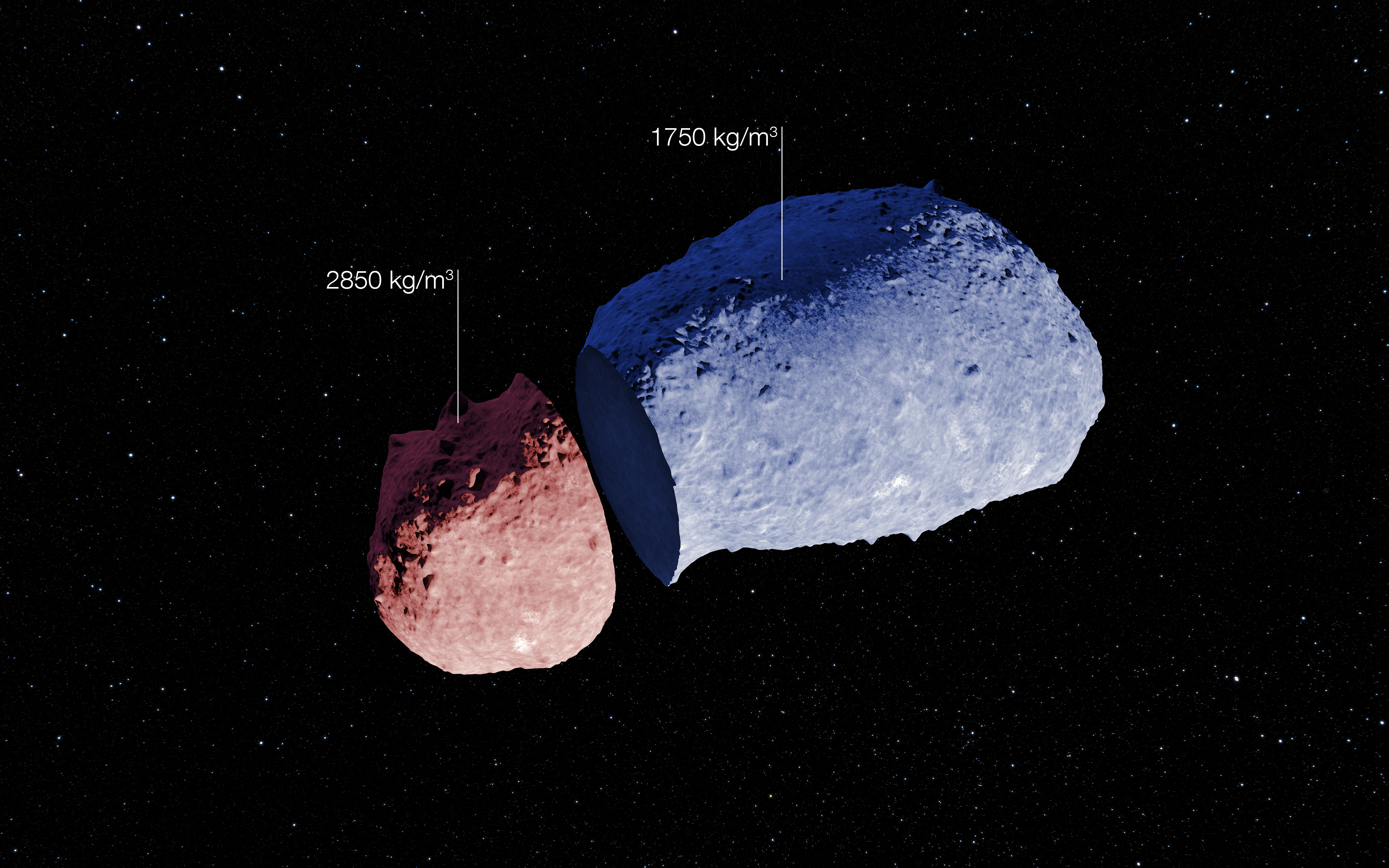
Schematic of Itokawa's two lobes separated from each other. Their divergent densities suggest that these were stand-alone bodies that came into contact later on, making the rubble pile also a likely contact binary.

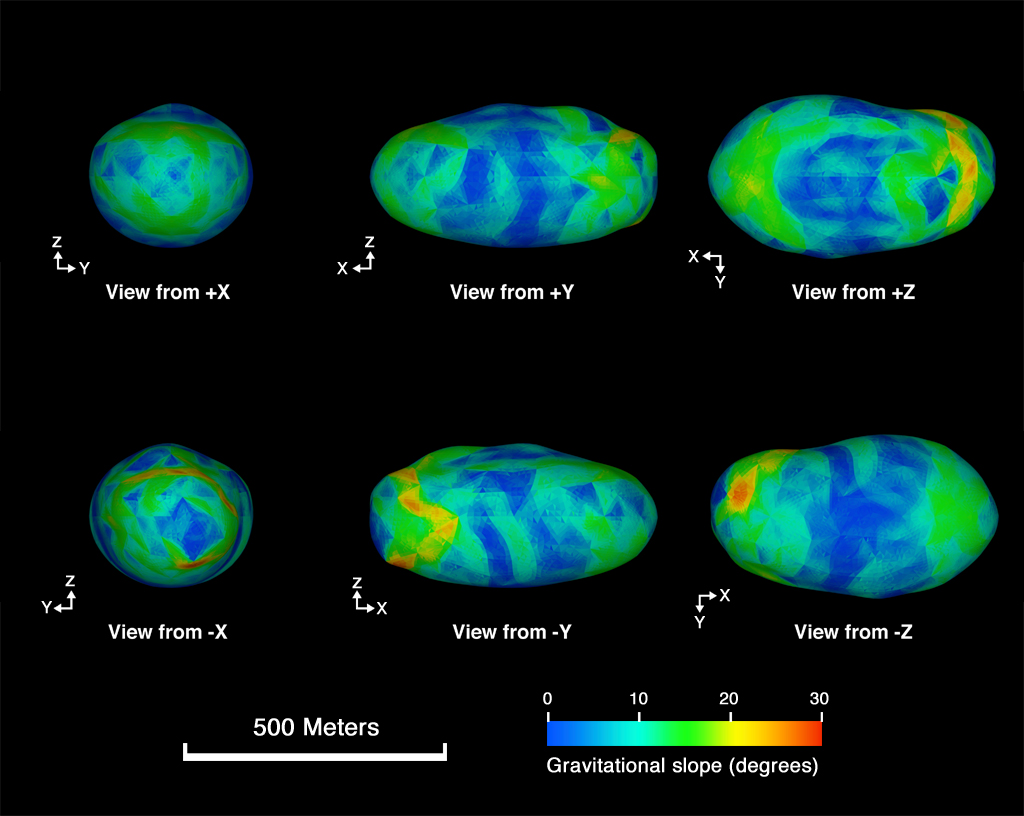
Preliminary shape model of Itokawa based on radar observations by Goldstone and Arecibo

Itokawa is a stony S-type asteroid. Radar imaging by Goldstone in 2001 observed an ellipsoid 630±60 meters long and 250±30 meters wide.

The Hayabusa mission confirmed these findings and also suggested that Itokawa may be a contact binary formed by two or more smaller asteroids that have gravitated toward each other and stuck together. The Hayabusa images show a surprising lack of impact craters and a very rough surface studded with boulders, described by the mission team as a rubble pile. Furthermore, the density of the asteroid is too low for it to be made from solid rock. This would mean that Itokawa is not a monolith but rather a rubble pile formed from fragments that have cohered over time. Based on Yarkovsky–O'Keefe–Radzievskii–Paddack effect measurements, a small section of Itokawa is estimated to have a density of 2.9 g/cm^{3}, whereas a larger section is estimated to have a density of 1.8 g/cm^{3}.

=== Rotation period and poles ===
Since 2001, a large number of rotational lightcurves of Itokawa have been obtained from photometric observations. Analysis of the best-rated lightcurve by Mikko Kaasalainen gave a sidereal rotation period of 12.132 hours with a high brightness variation of 0.8 magnitude, indicative of the asteroid's non-spherical shape (U=3). In addition, Kaasalainen also determined two spin axes of (355.0°, −84.0°) and (39°, −87.0°) in ecliptic coordinates (λ, β). Alternative lightcurve measurements were made by Lambert (12 h), Lowry (12.1 and 12.12 h), Ohba (12.15 h), Warner (12.09 h), (Note: Lightcurve plot of (25143) Itokawa, Palmer Divide Observatory (716) by B. D. Warner (2004). Summary figures at the LCDB.) Ďurech (12.1323 h), and Nishihara (12.1324 h).

=== Composition ===
The 26 August 2011 issue of Science devoted six articles to findings based on dust that Hayabusa had collected from Itokawa. Scientists' analysis suggested that Itokawa was probably made up from interior fragments of a larger asteroid that broke apart. Dust collected from the asteroid surface is thought to have been exposed there for about eight million years.

Scientists used varied techniques of chemistry and mineralogy to analyze the dust from Itokawa. Itokawa's composition was found to match the common type of meteorites known as "low-total-iron, low metal ordinary chondrites". Another team of scientists determined that the dark iron color on the surface of Itokawa was the result of abrasion by micrometeoroids and high-speed particles from the Sun which had converted the normally whitish iron oxide coloring.

==== 2018 Hayabusa results ====
Two separate groups report water in different Itokawa particles. Jin et al. report water in low-calcium pyroxene grains. The water's isotope level corresponds with inner Solar System and carbonaceous chondrite water isotope levels. Daly et al. report "OH and H_{2}O" apparently formed by implantation of solar wind hydrogen. The rims of an olivine particle "show an enrichment of up to ~1.2 at % in OH and H_{2}O". The water concentrations of the Itokawa grains would indicate an estimated BSI (Bulk Silicate Itokawa) water content in line with Earth's bulk water, and that Itokawa had been a "water-rich asteroid".

==== 2020 Hayabusa results ====
At the 2020 Lunar and Planetary Science Conference, a third group reported water and organics, via a third Hayabusa particle- RA-QD02-0612, or "Amazon." Olivine, pyroxene, and albite contain water. Isotopic compositions indicate a clear extraterrestrial origin.

==== 2021 Hayabusa results ====
A further report by Daly's group was published which supported the theory that a large source of Earth's water has come from hydrogen atoms carried on particles in the solar wind which combine with oxygen on asteroids and then arrive on Earth in space dust. Using atom probe tomography the study found hydroxide and water molecules on the surface of a single grain from particles retrieved from the asteroid Itokawa by the Japanese space probe Hayabusa.

Dust ponds are identified in the asteroid. They are a phenomenon where pockets of dust are seen in Celestial bodies without a significant atmosphere. Smooth deposits of dust accumulate in depressions on the surface of the body (like craters), contrasting from the Rocky terrain around them. In the Sagamihara and Muses-Sea regions of the asteroid dust ponds were identified. Dust particles had a size varying from millimeters to less than a centimeter.

== See also ==
- 162173 Ryugu, target of sample-return mission Hayabusa2, the successor to Hayabusa
- 101955 Bennu, target of NASA sample-return mission OSIRIS-REx
- (341843) 2008 EV5, target of cancelled NASA sample-return mission Asteroid Redirect Mission
