= Rubble pile =

Celestial body composed of many pieces of rock held together by gravity

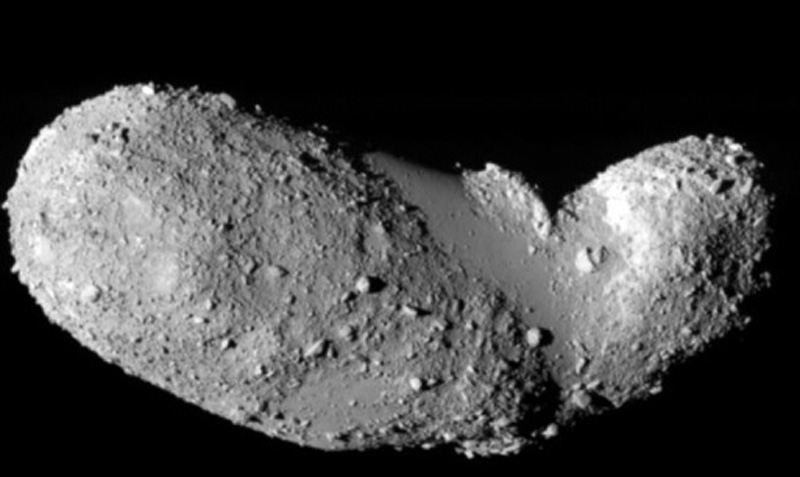
The small near-Earth asteroid 25143 Itokawa is a prime example of a rubble pile, with numerous boulders covering its surface

In astronomy, a rubble pile is a celestial body that consists of numerous pieces of debris that have coalesced under the influence of gravity. Rubble piles have low density because there are large cavities between the various chunks that make them up.

The asteroids Bennu and Ryugu have a measured bulk density which suggests that their internal structure is a rubble pile. Many comets and most smaller minor planets (<10 km in diameter) are thought to be composed of coalesced rubble.

== Minor planets ==
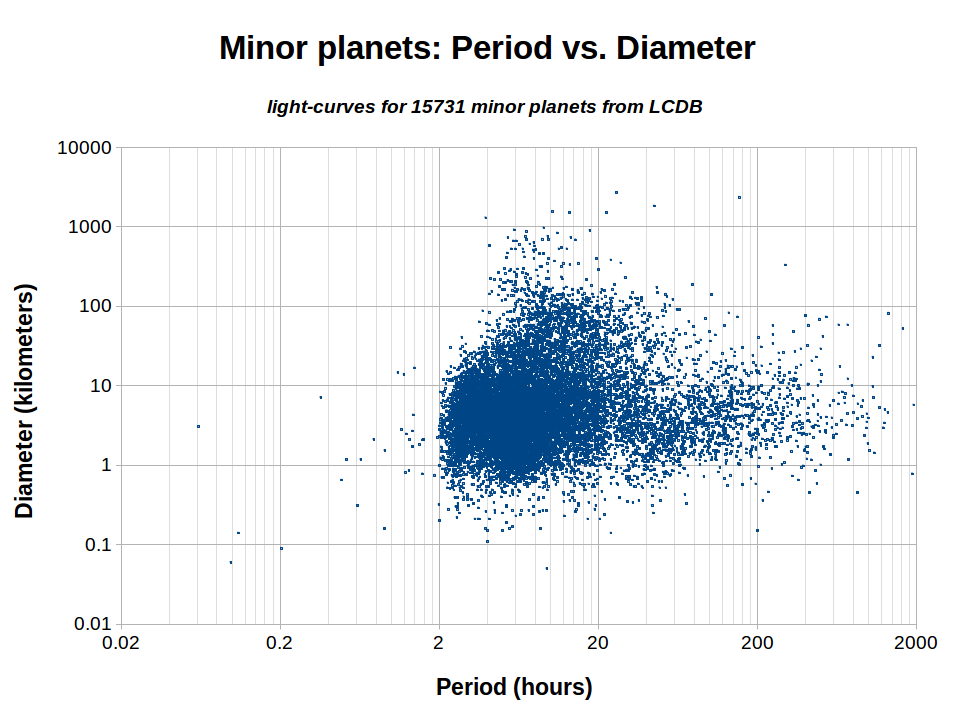
Rotation periods of a large number of minor planets. (Note: Data source, reference: Warner, B.D., Harris, A.W., Pravec, P. (2009). Icarus 202, 134–146. Updated 2016 September 6. See: www.MinorPlanet.info) Most smaller bodies have a period between 2.2 and 20 hours, and are thought to be rubble piles. Bodies rotating faster than 2.2 hours, however, must be monolithic, as they would fly apart because of centrifugal force otherwise. This explains why there are so few fast-spinning minor planets.

Most smaller asteroids are thought to be rubble piles.

Rubble piles form when an asteroid or moon (which may originally be monolithic) is smashed to pieces by an impact, and the shattered pieces subsequently fall back together, primarily due to self-gravitation. This coalescing usually takes from several hours to weeks.

When a rubble-pile asteroid passes a much more massive object, tidal forces change its shape.

Scientists first suspected that asteroids are often rubble piles when asteroid densities were first determined. Many of the calculated densities were significantly less than those of meteorites, which in some cases had been determined to be pieces of asteroids.

Many asteroids with low densities are thought to be rubble piles, for example 253 Mathilde. The mass of Mathilde, as determined by the NEAR Shoemaker mission, is far too low for the volume observed, considering the surface is rock. Even ice with a thin crust of rock would not provide a suitable density. Also, the large impact craters on Mathilde would have shattered a rigid body. However, the first unambiguous rubble pile to be photographed is 25143 Itokawa, which has no obvious impact craters and is thus almost certainly a coalescence of shattered fragments.

The asteroid 433 Eros, the primary destination of NEAR Shoemaker, was determined to be riven with cracks but otherwise solid. Other asteroids, possibly including Itokawa, have been found to be contact binaries, two major bodies touching, with or without rubble filling the boundary.

Large interior voids are possible because of the very low gravity of most asteroids. Despite a fine regolith on the outside (at least to the resolution that has been seen with spacecraft), the asteroid's gravity is so weak that friction between fragments dominates and prevents small pieces from falling inwards and filling the voids.

All the largest asteroids (1 Ceres, 2 Pallas, 4 Vesta, 10 Hygiea, 704 Interamnia) are solid objects without any macroscopic internal porosity. This may be because they have been large enough to withstand all impacts, and have never been shattered. Alternatively, Ceres and some few other of the largest asteroids may be massive enough that, even if they were shattered but not dispersed, their gravity would collapse most voids upon recoalescing. Vesta, at least, has withstood intact one major impact since its formation and shows signs of internal structure from differentiation in the resultant crater that assures that it is not a rubble pile. This serves as evidence for size as a protection from shattering into rubble.

== Comets ==
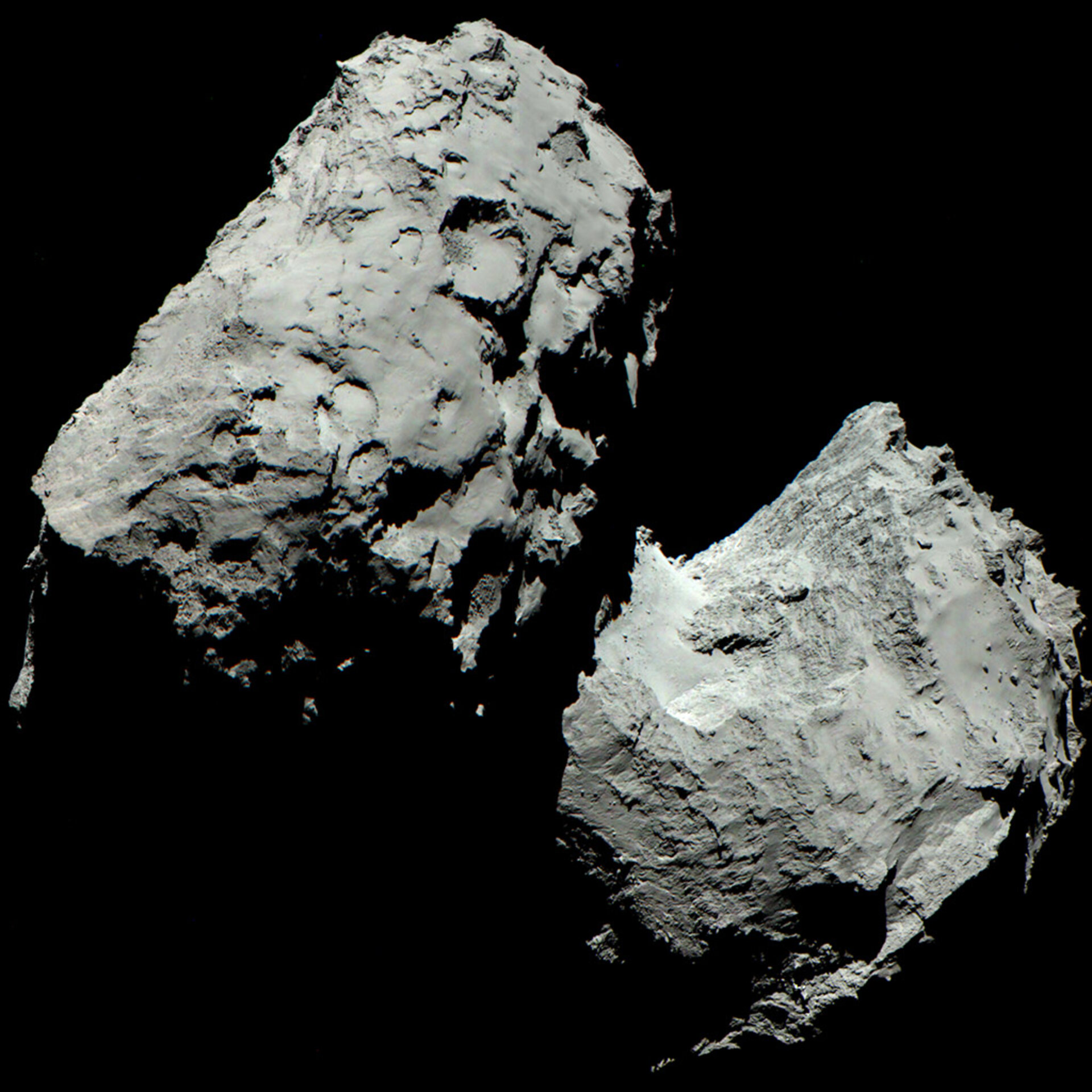
Nucleus of comet 67P/Churyumov–Gerasimenko imaged by Rosetta

Observational evidence suggest that most cometary nuclei are loosely bound agglomerations of smaller fragments accumulated from the collisional debris of other objects. Larger cometary nuclei are more likely primordial, having formed directly from the protosolar nebula instead. However, in situ observations by the Rosetta mission indicate that it may be more complex than that.

== Moons ==
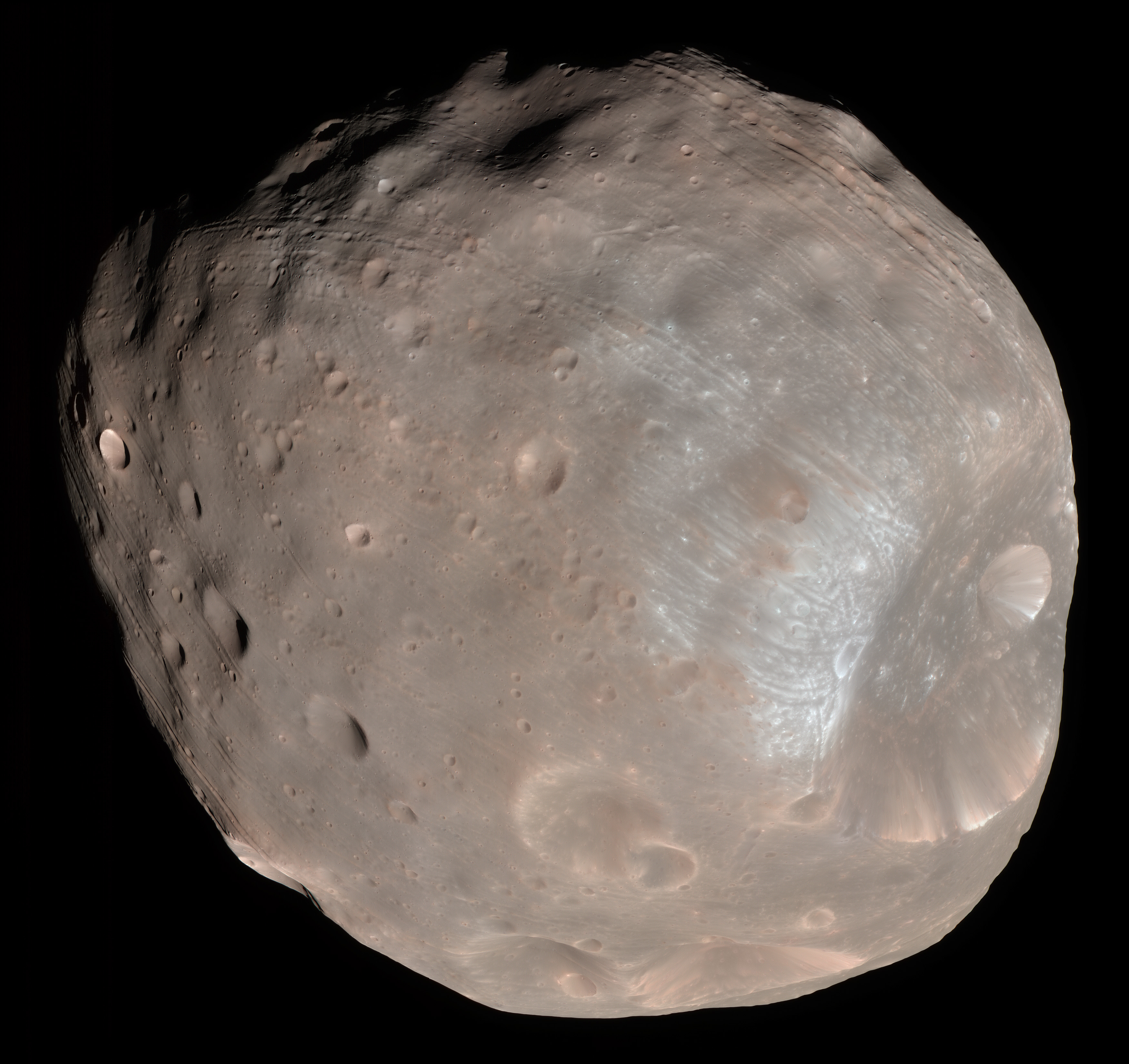
Phobos imaged by the Mars Reconnaissance Orbiter

The moon Phobos, the larger of the two natural satellites of the planet Mars, is also thought to be a rubble pile bound together by a thin regolith crust about 100 m (330 ft) thick. A rubble-pile morphology may point towards an in situ origin of the Martian moons. Based on this, it has been proposed that Phobos and Deimos may originate from a single destroyed moon. Alternatively, Phobos may have undergone repeated 'recycling', having been torn apart into a ring before reaccreting and migrating outwards.

== See also ==
- Circumplanetary disk
- Comet nucleus
- List of slow rotators (minor planets)
