= Lunar regolith =

Rock dust covering the Moon

Buzz Aldrin's bootprint on lunar soil was formed during the 1969 Apollo 11 mission.

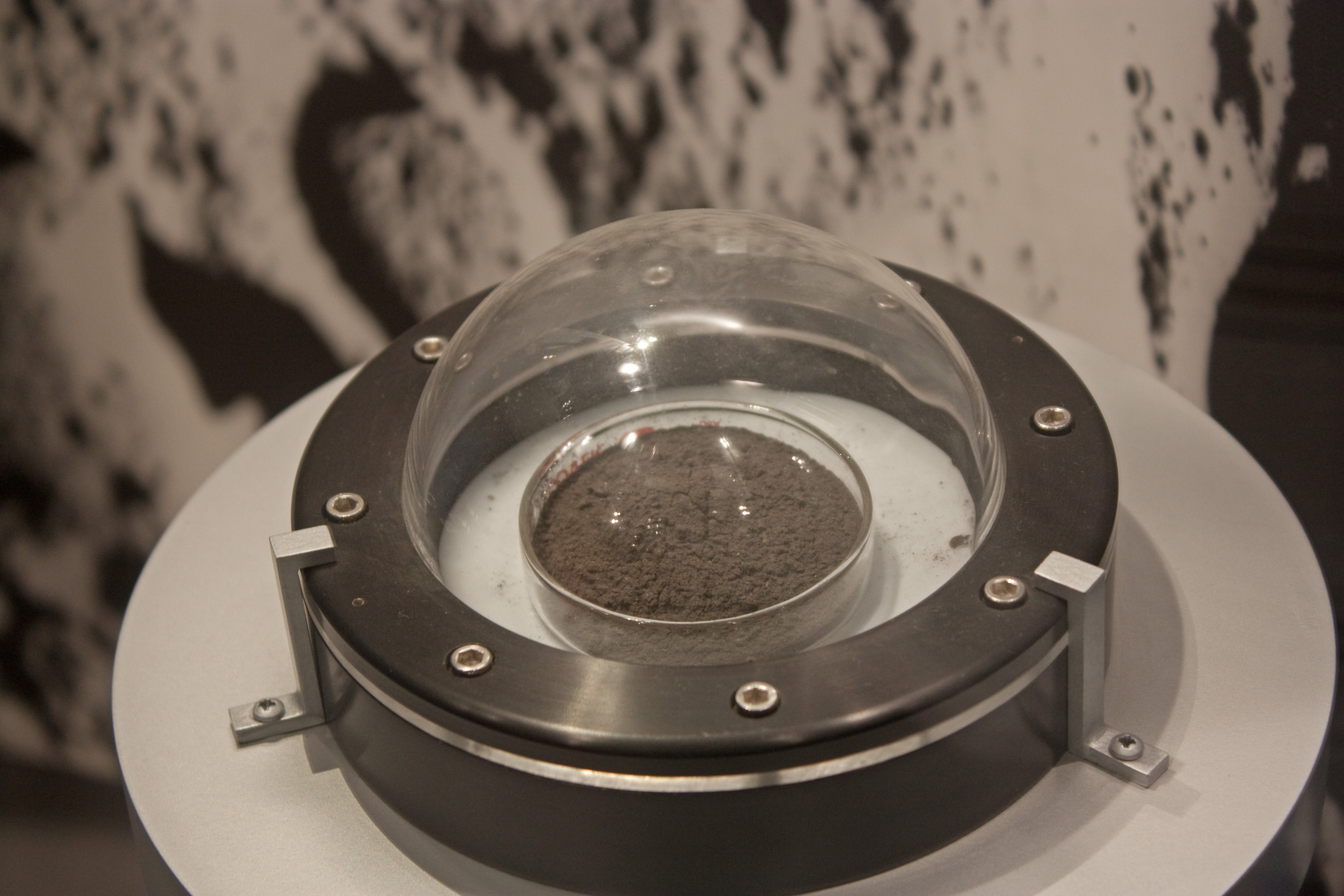
Regolith collected during the 1972 Apollo 17 mission display in 2011 at the National Museum of Natural History

Lunar regolith is the unconsolidated material found on the surface of the Moon and in the Moon's tenuous atmosphere. Lunar soil typically refers to only the finer fraction of lunar regolith, which is composed of grains 1 cm in diameter or less, but is often used interchangeably. Lunar soil differs substantially in properties from terrestrial soil. Lunar dust is even finer regolith than lunar soil, with grain sizes less than one millimeter.

Lunar regolith is primarily the result of mechanical weathering. Continual meteoric impacts and bombardment by solar and interstellar charged atomic particles of the lunar surface over billions of years have ground the basaltic and anorthositic rock, the regolith of the Moon, into progressively finer material. This situation contrasts fundamentally to terrestrial soil formation, mediated by the presence of molecular oxygen (O_{2}), humidity, atmospheric wind, and a robust array of contributing biological processes.

As the Moon's fine surface layer, lunar regolith is picked up by even weak natural phenomena active at the Moon's surface, allowing it to be part of the Moon's scant atmosphere. It is easily disturbed and poses a significant hazard to exposed equipment and human health. The fine lunar regolith is made of sharp and very adhesive particles, with a distinct gunpowder taste and smell. Potentially, lunar regolith could be prospected as a lunar resource, particularly for lunar in situ utilization, such as a lunar building material and regolith for growing plants on the Moon.

== Formation processes ==
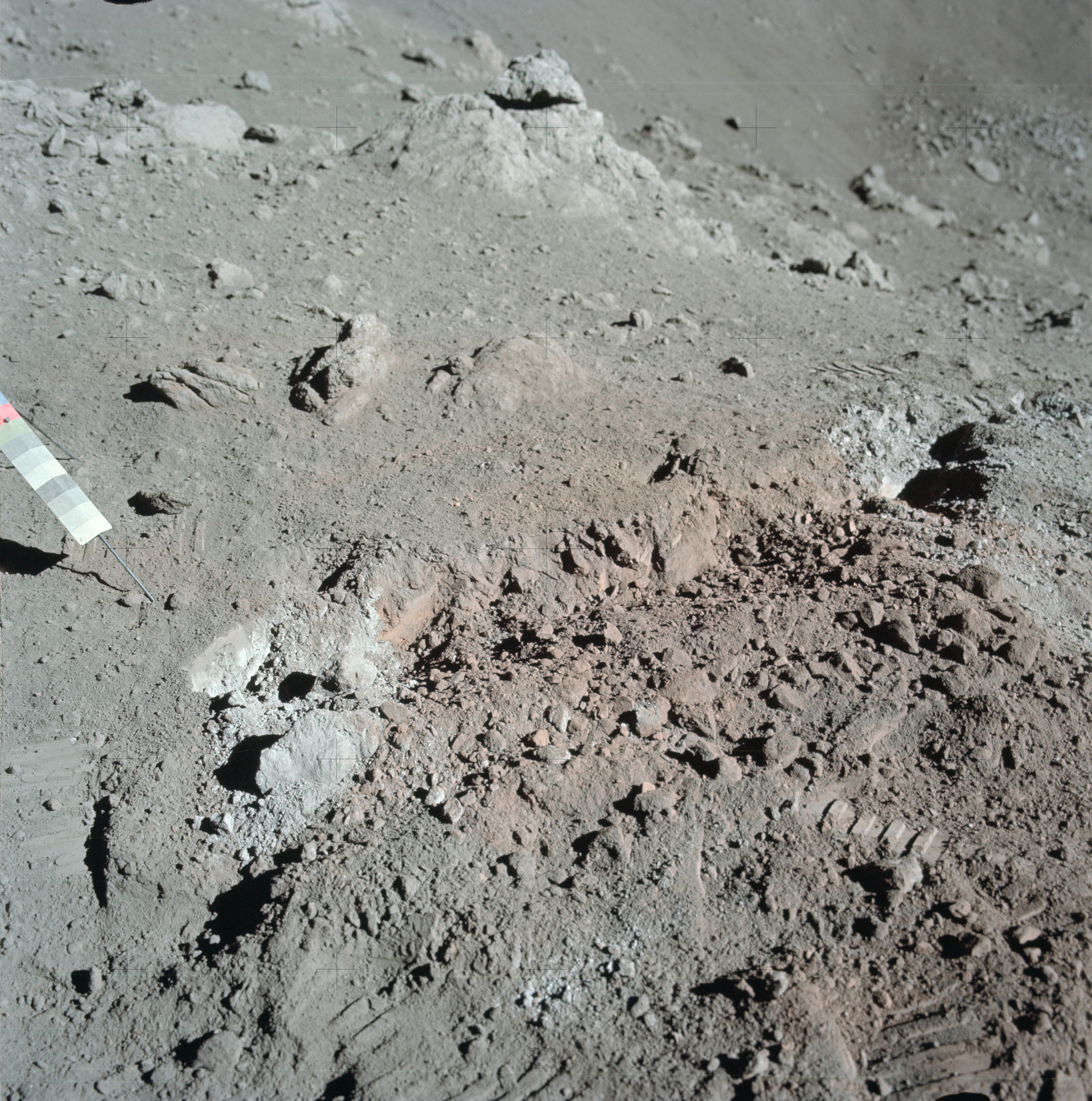
Orange dirt found on Apollo 17, the result of volcanic glass beads

The major processes involved in the formation of lunar regolith are:

- Comminution: mechanical breaking of rocks and minerals into smaller particles by meteorite and micrometeorite impacts;
- Agglutination: welding of mineral and rock fragments together by micrometeorite-impact-produced glass;
- Solar wind sputtering and cosmic ray spallation caused by impacts of ions and high energy particles.

These processes continue to change the physical and optical properties of the dirt over time, and it is known as space weathering.

In addition, fire fountaining, whereby volcanic lava is lofted and cools into small glass beads before falling back to the surface, can create small but important deposits in some locations, such as the orange dirt found at Shorty Crater in the Taurus-Littrow valley by Apollo 17, and the green glass found at Hadley–Apennine by Apollo 15. Deposits of volcanic beads are also thought to be the origin of Dark Mantle Deposits (DMD) in other locations around the Moon.

== Circulation ==
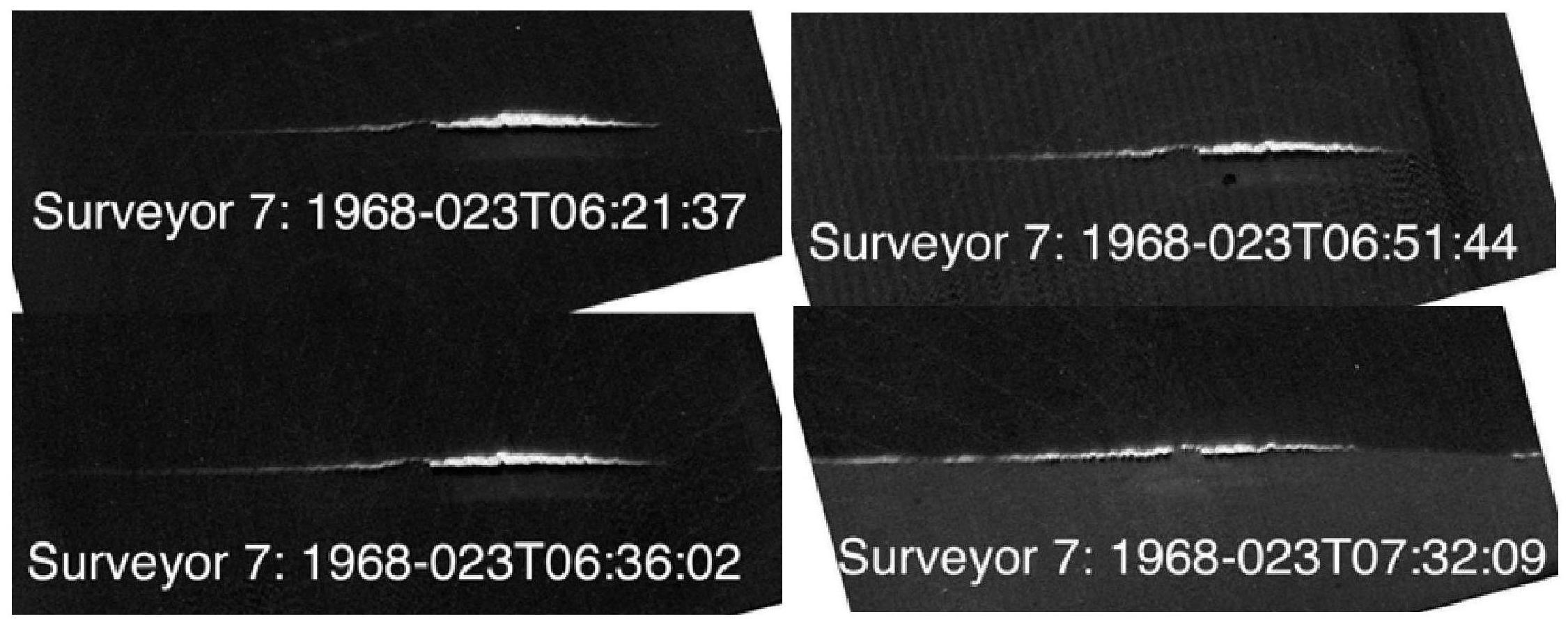
Surveyor 7 observes levitating dust

There is some evidence that the Moon has a tenuous layer of moving dust particles constantly leaping up from and falling back to the Moon's surface, giving rise to a "dust atmosphere" that looks static but is composed of dust particles in constant motion. The term "Moon fountain" has been used to describe this effect by analogy with the stream of molecules of water in a fountain following a ballistic trajectory while appearing static due to the constancy of the stream. According to a model proposed in 2005 by the Laboratory for Extraterrestrial Physics at NASA's Goddard Space Flight Center, this is caused by electrostatic levitation. On the daylit side of the Moon, solar hard ultraviolet and X-ray radiation is energetic enough to knock electrons out of atoms and molecules in the lunar regolith. Positive charges build up until the tiniest particles of lunar dust (measuring 1 micrometre and smaller) are repelled from the surface and lofted anywhere from metres to kilometres high, with the smallest particles reaching the highest altitudes. Eventually they fall back toward the surface where the process is repeated. On the night side, the dust is negatively charged by electrons from the solar wind. Indeed, the fountain model suggests that the night side would achieve greater electrical tension differences than the day side, possibly launching dust particles to even higher altitudes. This effect could be further enhanced during the portion of the Moon's orbit where it passes through Earth's magnetotail, part of the magnetic field of the Moon. On the terminator there could be significant horizontal electric fields forming between the day and night areas, resulting in horizontal dust transport—a form of "Moon storm".

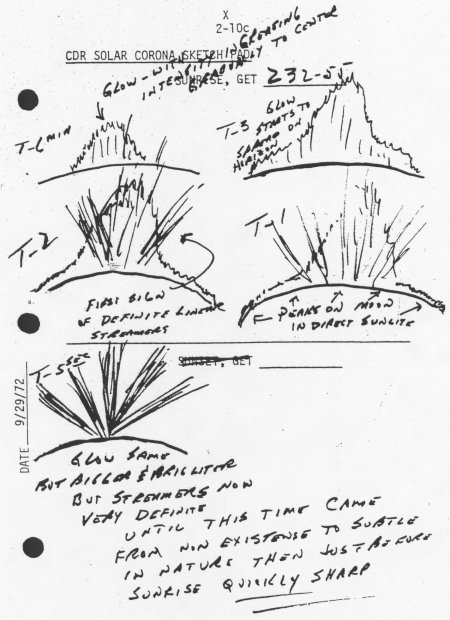
Lunar "twilight rays" sketched by Apollo 17 astronauts

This effect was anticipated in 1956 by science fiction author Hal Clement in his short story "Dust Rag", published in Astounding Science Fiction.

There is some evidence for this effect. In the early 1960s, Surveyor 7 and several prior Surveyor spacecraft that soft-landed on the Moon returned photographs showing an unmistakable twilight glow low over the lunar horizon persisting after the Sun had set. Moreover, contrary to the expectation of airless conditions with no atmospheric haze, the distant horizon between land and sky did not look razor-sharp. Apollo 17 astronauts orbiting the Moon in 1972 repeatedly saw and sketched what they variously called "bands," "streamers" or "twilight rays" for about 10 seconds before lunar sunrise or lunar sunset. Such rays were also reported by astronauts aboard Apollo 8, 10, and 15. These might have been similar to crepuscular rays on Earth.

Apollo 17 also placed an experiment on the Moon's surface called LEAM, short for Lunar Ejecta and Meteorites. It was designed to look for dust kicked up by small meteoroids hitting the Moon's surface. It had three sensors that could record the speed, energy, and direction of tiny particles: one each pointing up, east, and west. LEAM saw a large number of particles every morning, mostly coming from the east or west—rather than above or below—and mostly slower than speeds expected for lunar ejecta. In addition, the experiment's temperature increased to near 100 degrees Celsius a few hours after each lunar sunrise, so the unit had to be turned off temporarily because it was overheating. It is speculated that this could have been a result of electrically charged moondust sticking to LEAM, darkening its surface so the experiment package absorbed rather than reflected sunlight. However, scientists were unable to make a definite determination of the source of the problem, as LEAM operated only briefly before the Apollo program ended.

It is possible that these storms have been spotted from Earth: For centuries, there have been reports of strange glowing lights on the Moon, known as "transient lunar phenomena" or TLPs. Some TLPs have been observed as momentary flashes, now generally accepted to be visible evidence of meteoroids impacting the lunar surface. But others have appeared as amorphous reddish or whitish glows or even as dusky hazy regions that change shape or disappear over seconds or minutes. These may have been a result of sunlight reflecting from suspended lunar dust.

=== Anthropogenic spread ===
A short video of a Lunar Roving Vehicle kicking up lunar regolith (Apollo 16, 1972)

While the Moon has a faint atmosphere, traffic and impacts of human activity on the Moon could cause clouds of lunar regolith to spread far across the Moon, and possibly contaminate the original state of the Moon and its special scientific content.

== Physical properties ==
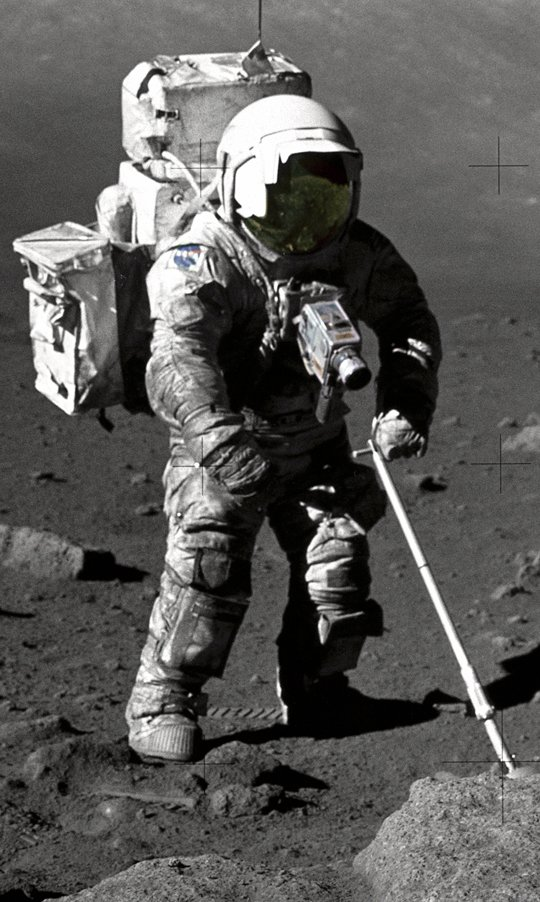
Lunar dust is very fine and difficult to clean off, as with Apollo 17's Harrison Schmitt in a spacesuit working on the Moon being covered in lunar dust

Due to a myriad of meteorite impacts (with speeds in the range of 20 km/s), the lunar surface is covered with a thin layer of dust. The dust is electrically charged and sticks to any surface with which it comes in contact.

The density of lunar regolith is about 1.5 g/cm^{3} and increases with depth. By mass 50% is particles smaller than 60-80μm, 10% smaller than 10μm, and 10% larger than 1mm.

Other factors which may affect the properties of lunar regolith include large temperature differentials, the presence of a hard vacuum, and the absence of a significant lunar magnetic field, thereby allowing charged solar wind particles to continuously hit the surface of the Moon.

== Chemical constituents ==
98-99% of the composition of lunar rocks and soil consists of seven elements: Oxygen (41-45%), silicon (Si), aluminum (Al), calcium (Ca), iron (Fe), magnesium (Mg), and titanium (Ti). Nearly all of the remaining 1-2% is manganese (Mn), sodium (Na), potassium (K), and phosphorus (P).

== Mineralogy and composition ==
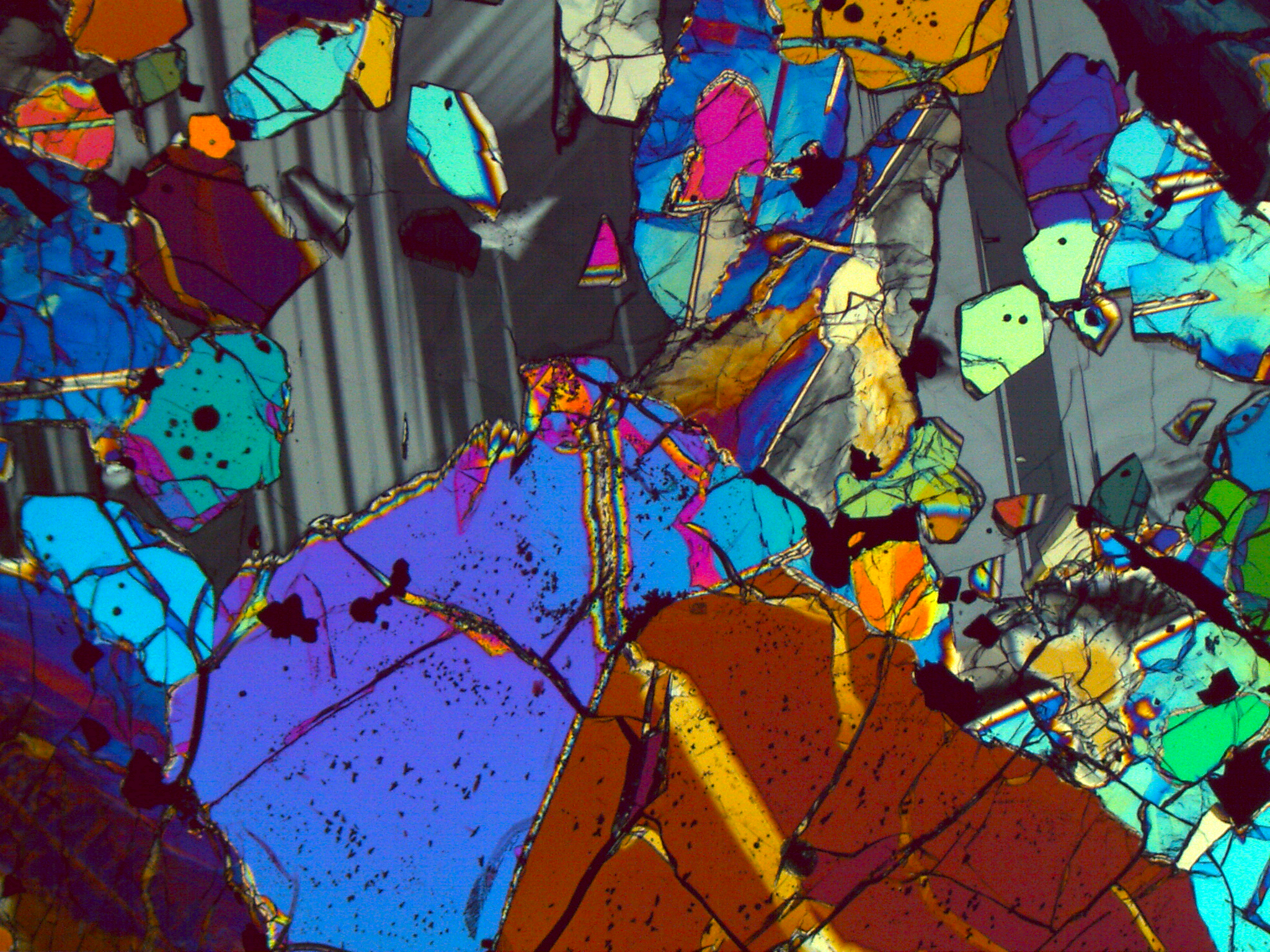
Thin section of Apollo 12 Oceanus Procellarum sample 12005 in cross polarized light showing Lunar minerals

The composition of Lunar regolith reflects the composition of the parent rocks it overlies. Over time, material is mixed both vertically and horizontally (a process known as "gardening") by impact processes. While mare and highland regolith have distinct compositions, their mineral inventories are very similar, rather expressing a difference of ratio of mineral phases. The primary minerals identified in Lunar regolith are plagioclase, olivine, augite, orthopyroxene, pigeonite, ilmenite, chromite, quartz, cristobalite, and whitlockite. Glass is abundant in the Lunar regolith and forms as a result of impact melting. Ice is an important mineral in permanently shaded craters. Lunar regolith is divided into highland and mare on the basis of their composition, and further divided into high-, low-, and very low-titanium on the basis of their ilmenite content.

The contribution of material from external sources is relatively minor (outside of ray systems), such that the dirt composition at any given location largely reflects the local bedrock composition. Lunar regolith reportedly tastes and smells of spent gunpowder.

Lunar regolith is composed of various types of particles including rock fragments, mono-mineralic fragments, and various kinds of glasses including agglutinate particles, volcanic and impact spherules. The agglutinates form at the lunar surface by micrometeorite impacts that cause small-scale melting which fuses adjacent materials together with tiny specks of elemental iron embedded in each dust particle's glassy shell.

There are two primary differences in the chemistry of lunar regolith and dirt from terrestrial materials. The first is that the Moon is very dry. As a result, those minerals with water as part of their structure (mineral hydration) such as clay, mica, and amphiboles are absent from the Moon's surface. The second difference is that lunar regolith and crust are chemically reduced, rather than being significantly oxidized like the Earth's crust. In the case of the regolith, this is due in part to the constant bombardment of the lunar surface with protons from the solar wind. One consequence is that iron on the Moon is found in the elemental (0) and cationic (+2) oxidation states, whereas on Earth iron is found primarily in the +2 and +3 oxidation states.

== Harmful effects of lunar dust ==
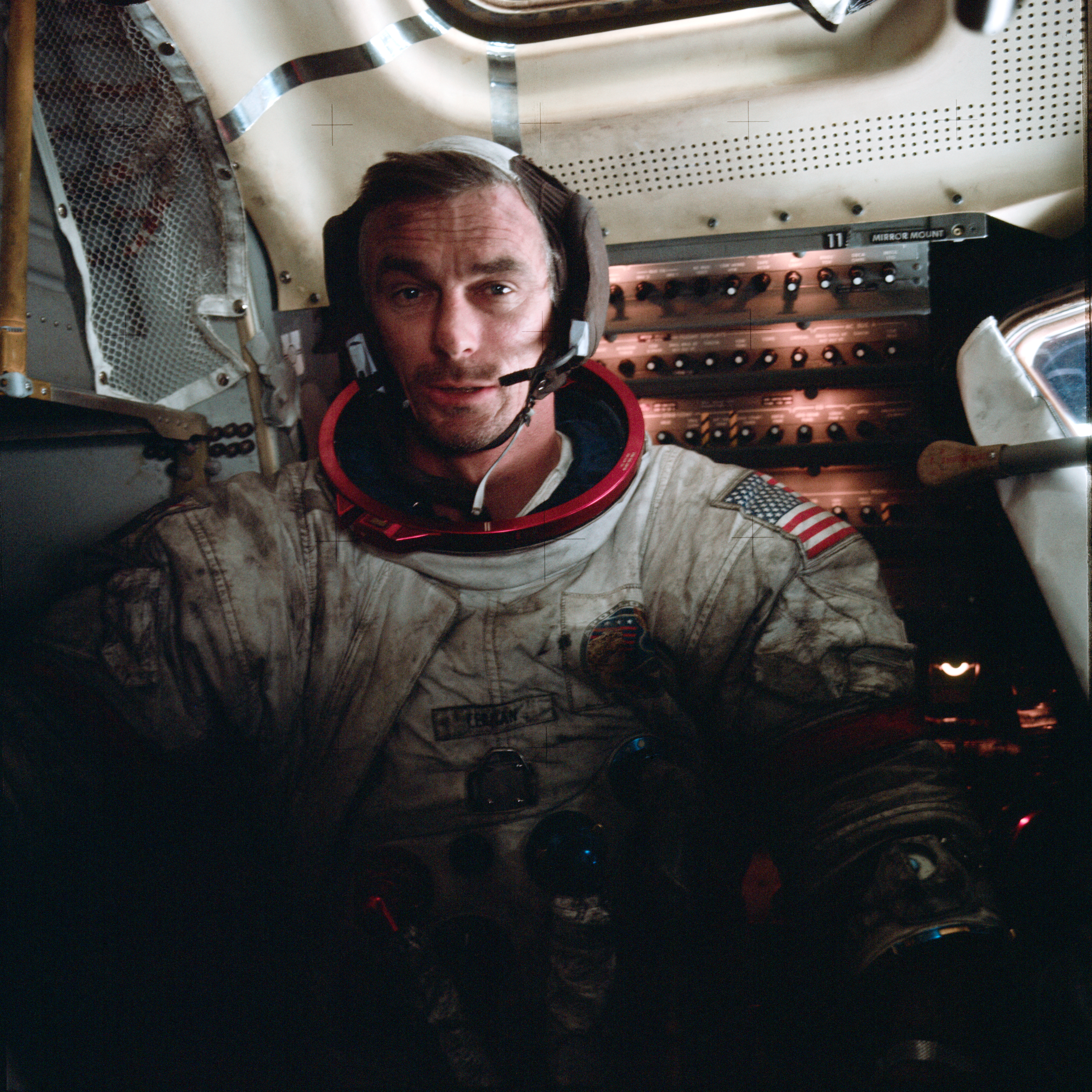
Gene Cernan with lunar dust stuck on his suit from his Apollo 17 moonwalks.

A 2005 NASA study listed 20 risks that required further study before humans should commit to a human Mars expedition, and ranked "dust" as the number one challenge. The report urged study of its mechanical properties, corrosiveness, grittiness, and effect on electrical systems. Most scientists think the only way to answer the questions definitively is by returning samples of Martian dirt and rock to Earth well before launching any astronauts.

Although that report addressed Martian dust, the concerns are equally valid concerning lunar dust. The dust found on the lunar surface could cause harmful effects on any human outpost technology and crew members:

- Darkening of surfaces, leading to a considerable increase in radiative heat transfer;
- Abrasive nature of the dust particles may rub and abrade surfaces through friction;
- Negative effect on coatings used on gaskets to seal equipment from space, optical lenses, solar panels, and windows as well as wiring;
- Possible damage to an astronaut's lungs, nervous, and cardiovascular systems;
- Possible increased risk of spacesuit arcing due to small dust grains' exposure to the space environment.

The principles of astronautical hygiene should be used to assess the risks of exposure to lunar dust during exploration on the Moon's surface and thereby determine the most appropriate measures to control exposure. These may include removing the spacesuit in a three-stage airlock, "vacuuming" the suit with a magnet before removal, and using local exhaust ventilation with a high-efficiency particulate filter to remove dust from the spacecraft's atmosphere.

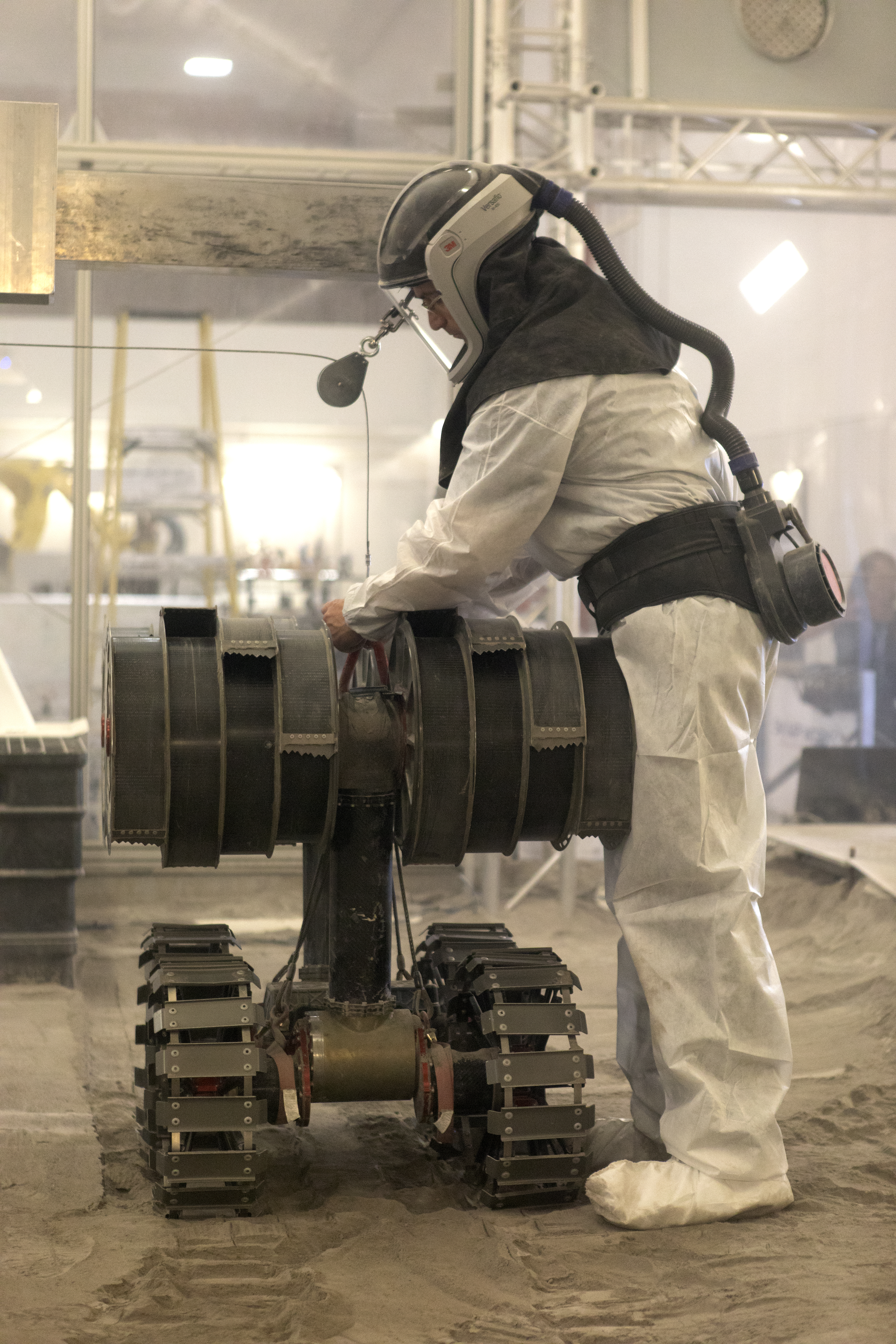
Person in protective gear working in the regolith bin of Swamp Works at NASA's Kennedy Space Center (Florida), testing the Regolith Advanced Surface Systems Operations Robot (RASSOR)

The harmful properties of lunar dust are not well known. Based on studies of dust found on Earth, it is expected that exposure to lunar dust will result in greater risks to health both from acute and chronic exposure. This is because lunar dust is more chemically reactive and has larger surface areas composed of sharper jagged edges than Earth dust. If the chemically reactive particles are deposited in the lungs, they may cause respiratory disease. Long-term exposure to the dust may cause a more serious respiratory disease similar to silicosis. During lunar exploration the astronauts' spacesuits will become contaminated with lunar dust. The dust will be released into the atmosphere when the suits are removed. The methods used to mitigate exposure will include providing high air recirculation rates in the airlock, the use of a "Double Shell Spacesuit", the use of dust shields, the use of high–grade magnetic separation, and the use of solar flux to sinter and melt the regolith.

=== Toxic effects ===
Anecdotal reports of human exposures to lunar dust during the Apollo program suggest that lunar dust has toxic properties. After each EVA, the crew modules were heavily contaminated with dust; many astronauts reported coughs, throat irritation, watery eyes, and blurred vision that likely reduced their performance. A flight surgeon exposed to the capsule interiors after recovery developed what appeared to be allergic reactions to lunar dust that worsened after each exposure. The apparent toxic effects of lunar dust were never comprehensively studied after the program, and the concentrations of dust that contaminated the spacecraft are not known. In each case, symptoms resolved within 24 hours, and post-flight pulmonary testing found no permanent impacts in the astronauts.

== Use ==
The potential of lunar soil for construction of structures has been proposed at least since the proposal of lunarcrete and increasingly tested.

The differences between Earth's and lunar soil mean that plants struggle to grow. As a result long-term space missions could require complicated and expensive efforts to provide food, such as importing Earth soil, chemically treating lunar regolith to remove heavy metals and oxidize iron atoms, and selectively breeding strains of plants that are adapted to the inhospitable lunar regolith. Lunar regolith has been tested and demonstrated capable of supporting plants on Earth.

== Availability on Earth ==
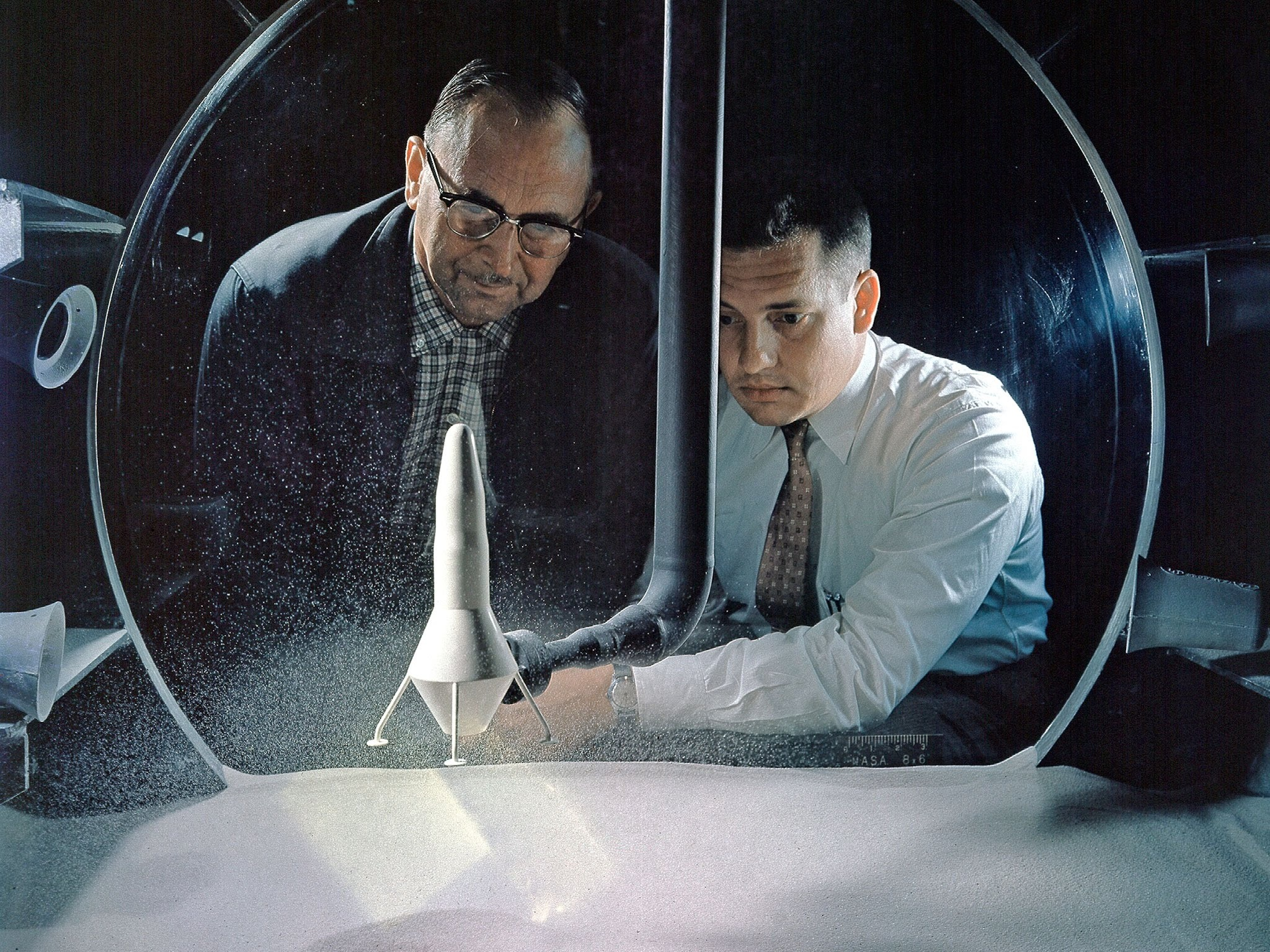
NASA Researchers view a demonstration of the moon dust simulator in the 8- by 6-Foot Supersonic Wind Tunnel facility at the NASA Lewis Research Center (1960).

The Apollo astronauts brought back some 360 kilograms (790 lb) of lunar rocks from six landing sites. Although this material has been isolated in vacuum-packed bottles, it is now unusable for detailed chemical or mechanical analysis—the gritty particles deteriorated the knife-edge indium seals of the vacuum bottles; the air has slowly leaked in. Every sample brought back from the Moon has been contaminated by Earth's air and humidity. The dust has acquired a patina of rust, and due to bonding with terrestrial water and oxygen molecules, its chemical reactivity is gone. The chemical and electrostatic properties of the dirt no longer match what future astronauts will encounter on the Moon.

Moon dust-contaminated items finally became available to the public in 2014, when the US government approved the sale of private material owned, and collected, by astronauts. Since then, only one item has been produced for sale with genuine Moon dust collected after spending over 32 hours on the Moon. A luggage strap, exposed to the elements of the Moon for 32 hours, a piece of Charles "Pete" Conrad's spacesuit on the Apollo 12 mission, was sold by his estate to a private purchaser at auction. In 2017 lunar regolith collected by Neil Armstrong in 1969 was put up for auction. While many jewelry- and watch-makers claim their product contains "Moon dust", the products only contain pieces of, or dust from, meteorites believed to have originated from the Moon. On 11 September 2020, NASA announced that it is willing to create a market for lunar regolith by calling for proposals to purchase it from commercial suppliers. In May 2022, scientists successfully grew plants using lunar regolith. Thale cress (Arabidopsis thaliana) was the first plant to sprout and grow on Earth in regolith from another celestial body.

=== Chang'e-5/6 Project ===
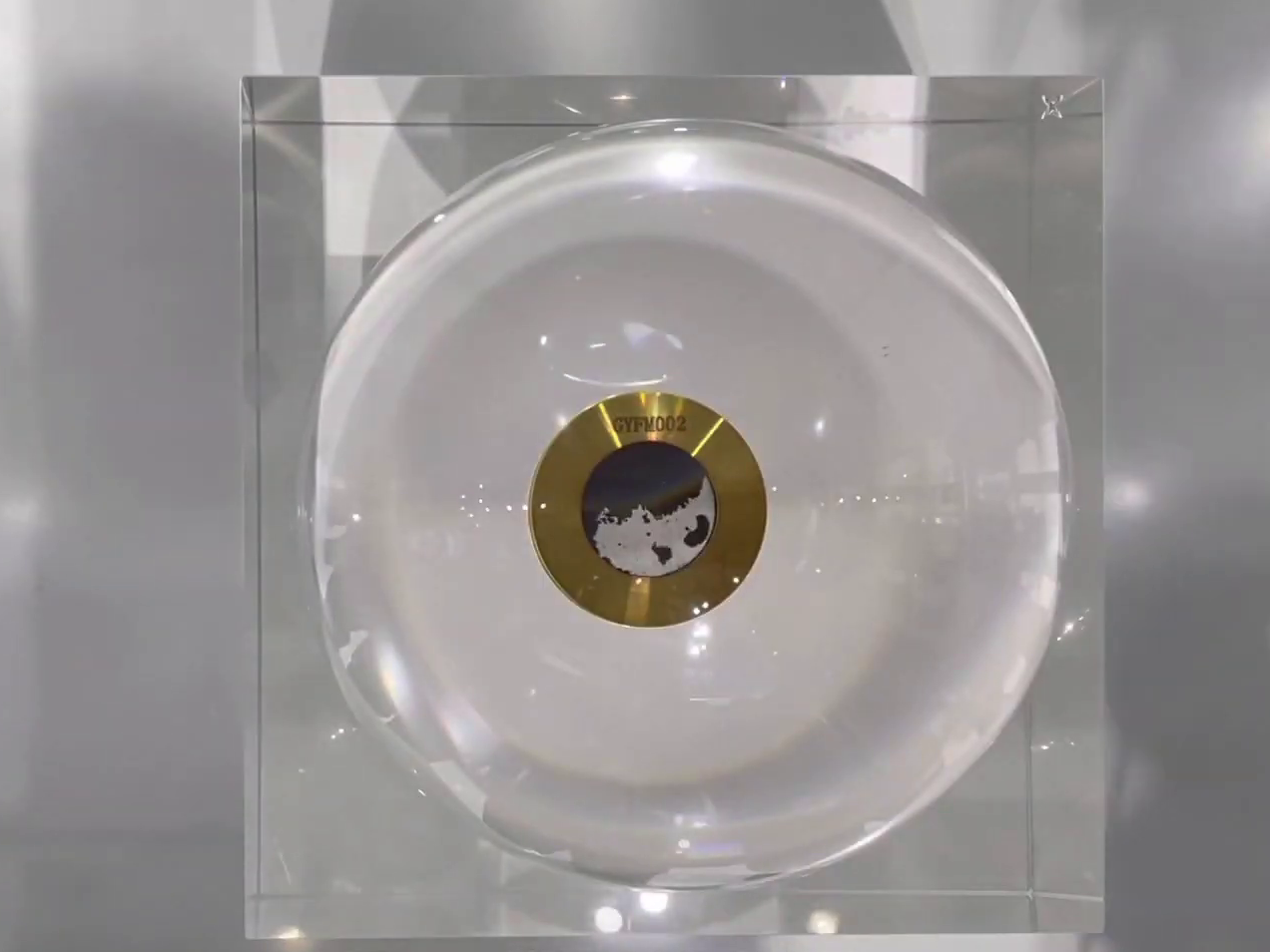
Lunar regolith sample collected by China's Chang'e 5 mission displayed at Airshow China 2021

On 16 December 2020, China's Chang'e 5 mission returned to Earth with about 2 kilograms of rock and dirt it picked up from the Moon. It is the first lunar regolith sample to return to Earth since 1972. China is the third country in the world to have brought such material back to Earth.

Chang'e-5 is part of the first phase of the Chinese Lunar Exploration Program. Chang'e 6 collected and returned samples from the far side of the Moon in 2024. There are still two projects left in this phase of the program (Chang'e-7 in 2026 and Chang'e-8 in 2027). The program's second phase is to land Chinese astronauts on the Moon between 2030 and 2039.

== See also ==
- Lunar resources
- Lunar terrane
- Selenography
- Sodium tail of the Moon
