= Surveyor 7 =

NASA lunar lander

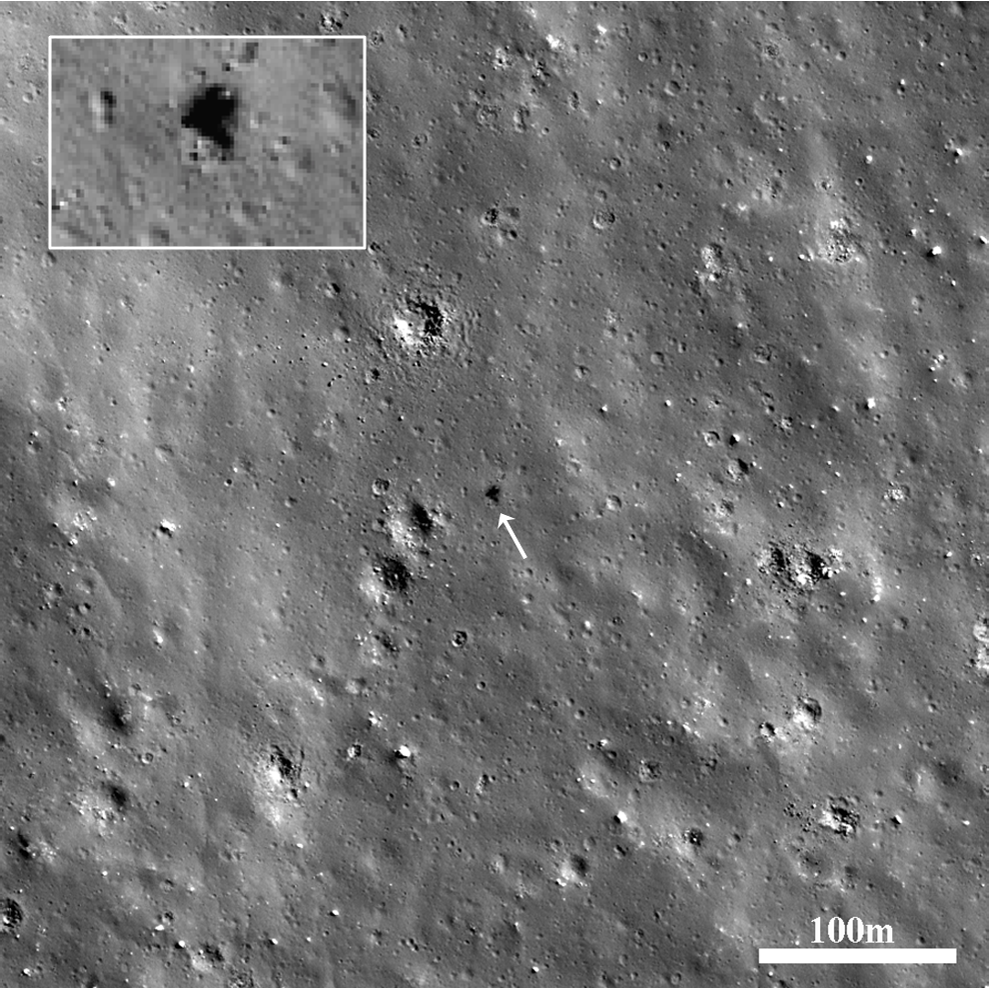
- Surveyor 7, sitting on the ejecta blanket of Tycho Crater (image width is 500 m). Inset is zoomed 4x [NASA/GSFC/Arizona State University].
- Mission type: Lunar lander
- Operator: NASA
- COSPAR ID: 1968-001A
- SATCAT no.: 03091
- Mission duration: 45 days (launch to last contact)

Spacecraft properties
- Manufacturer: Hughes Aircraft
- Launch mass: 1,040.1 kilograms (2,293 lb)
- Landing mass: 305.7 kilograms (674 lb) after landing

Start of mission
- Launch date: January 7, 1968, 06:30:00 UTC
- Rocket: Atlas SLV-3C Centaur-D AC-15
- Launch site: Cape Canaveral LC-36A

End of mission
- Last contact: February 21, 1968

Lunar lander
- Landing date: January 10, 1968, 01:05:36 UTC
- Landing site: 40.9810°S 11.51277°W

Surveyor 7 was sent to the Moon in 1968 on a scientific and photographic mission as the seventh and last lunar lander of the American uncrewed Surveyor program. With two previous unsuccessful missions in the Surveyor series, and with Surveyor 7's landing success, Surveyor 7 became the fifth and final spacecraft in the series to achieve a lunar soft landing. A total of 21,091 pictures were transmitted from Surveyor 7 back to Earth.

== History ==
The objectives for this mission were to perform a lunar soft landing (in an area well removed from the maria to provide a type of terrain photography and lunar sample significantly different from those of other Surveyor missions); obtain postlanding TV pictures; determine the relative abundances of chemical elements; manipulate the lunar material; obtain touchdown dynamics data; and obtain thermal and radar reflectivity data.

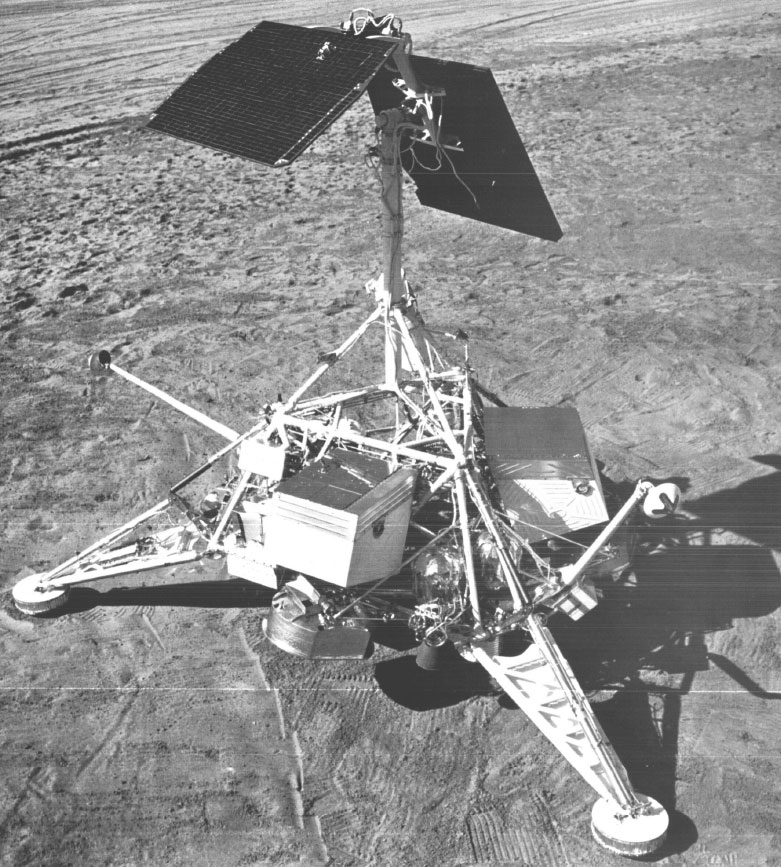
Surveyor model on Earth.

This spacecraft was similar in design to the previous Surveyors, but it carried more scientific equipment including a television camera with polarizing filters, a surface sampler, bar magnets on two footpads, two horseshoe magnets on the surface scoop, and auxiliary mirrors. Of the auxiliary mirrors, three were used to observe areas below the spacecraft, one to provide stereoscopic views of the surface sampler area, and seven to show lunar material deposited on the spacecraft. The spacecraft landed on the lunar surface on January 10, 1968, on the outer rim of the crater Tycho, at coordinates 40.980°S 11.514°W.

Operations of the spacecraft began shortly after the soft landing and were terminated on January 26, 1968, 80 hours after sunset. On January 20, while the craft was still in daylight, the TV camera clearly saw two laser beams aimed at it from the night side of the crescent Earth, one from Kitt Peak National Observatory, Tucson, Arizona, and the other at Table Mountain at Wrightwood, California.

Operations on the second lunar day occurred from February 12 to 21, 1968. The mission objectives were fully satisfied by the spacecraft operations. Battery damage was suffered during the first lunar night and transmission contact was subsequently sporadic. Contact with Surveyor 7 was lost on February 21, 1968.

NASA and Bellcom mission planners considered the Surveyor 7 site as a potential target for a crewed late Apollo mission, perhaps Apollo 20, though a combination of operational constraints, including the high latitude of the site and its rough terrain, and the early cancellation of post-Apollo 17 lunar missions, contributed to the site's elimination.

Surveyor 7 was the first probe to detect the faint glow on the lunar horizon after dark that is now thought to be light reflected from electrostatically levitated Moon dust, a phenomenon known as Lunar horizon glow

== Science instruments ==
=== Television ===
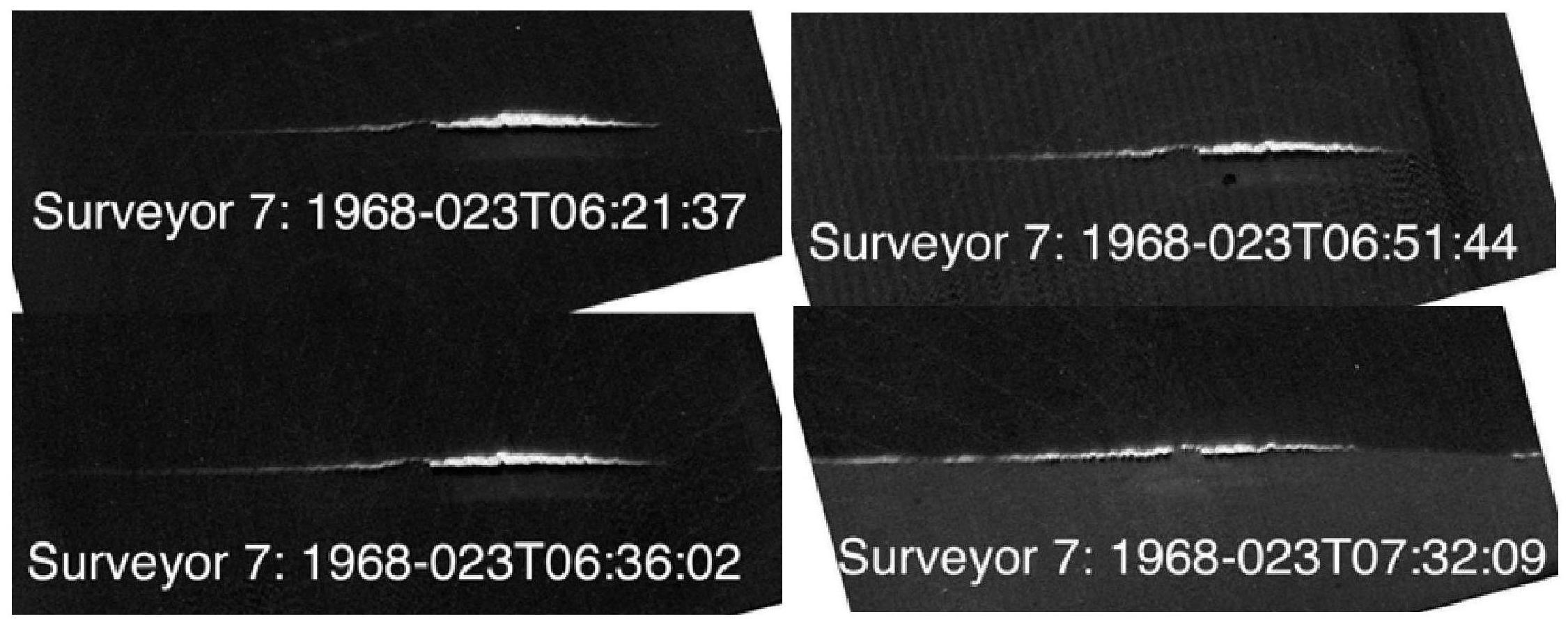
Surveyor 7 observes levitating dust

The TV camera consisted of a vidicon tube, 25 and 100 mm focal length lenses, shutters, polarizing filters, and iris mounted nearly vertically and surmounted by a mirror that could be adjusted by stepping motors to move in both azimuth and elevations. The polarizing filters served as analyzers for the detection of measurements of the linearly polarized component of light scattered from the lunar surface. The frame by frame coverage of the lunar surface provided a 360 deg azimuth view and an elevation view from approximately +90 deg above the plane normal to the camera A axis to -60 deg below this same plane.

Both 600 line and 200 line modes of operation were used. The 200 line mode transmitted over an omnidirectional antenna and scanned one frame each 61.8 seconds. A complete video transmission of each 200 line picture required 20 seconds and utilized a bandwidth of 1.2 kHz. Most transmissions consisted of 600 line pictures, which were telemetered by a directional antenna. The frames were scanned each 3.6 seconds. Each frame required nominally one second to be read from the vidicon and utilized a 220 kHz bandwidth for transmission. The dynamic range and sensitivity of this camera were slightly less than those on the Surveyor 6 camera. Resolution and quality were excellent. The television images were displayed on a slow scan monitor coated with a long persistency phosphor. The persistency was selected to optimally match the nominal maximum frame rate. One frame of TV identification was received for each incoming TV frame and was displayed in real time at a rate compatible with that of the incoming image. These data were recorded on a video magnetic tape recorder and on 70 mm film.

Surveyor 7 camera characteristics on 600-line mode were:

- Dynamic range: 11.1:1
- Signal-to-noise ratio (dB): 43.6
- Horizontal relative response at 600 lines (at center of vidicon): 0.20
- Vertical relative response at 600 lines (at center of vidicon): 0.33
- Slope of system transfer characteristic curve: 0.98

The camera transmitted 20,961 pictures during the first lunar day, January 10 to January 22, 1968. From February 12 to February 14, the camera was operated in the 200 line mode because of loss of horizontal sweep in the 600 line mode. During the second lunar day, 45 pictures were transmitted before loss of power caused suspension of camera operation.

On 20 January 1968, it successfully detected two argon lasers from Kitt Peak National Observatory in Arizona and Table Mountain Observatory in Wrightwood, California. This was one of the early tests of laser communication in space.

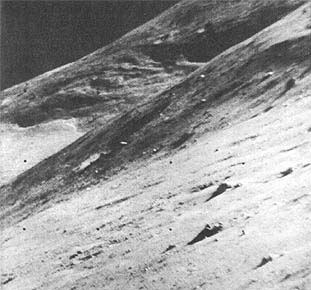
Rolling lunar terrain northeast of the landing site

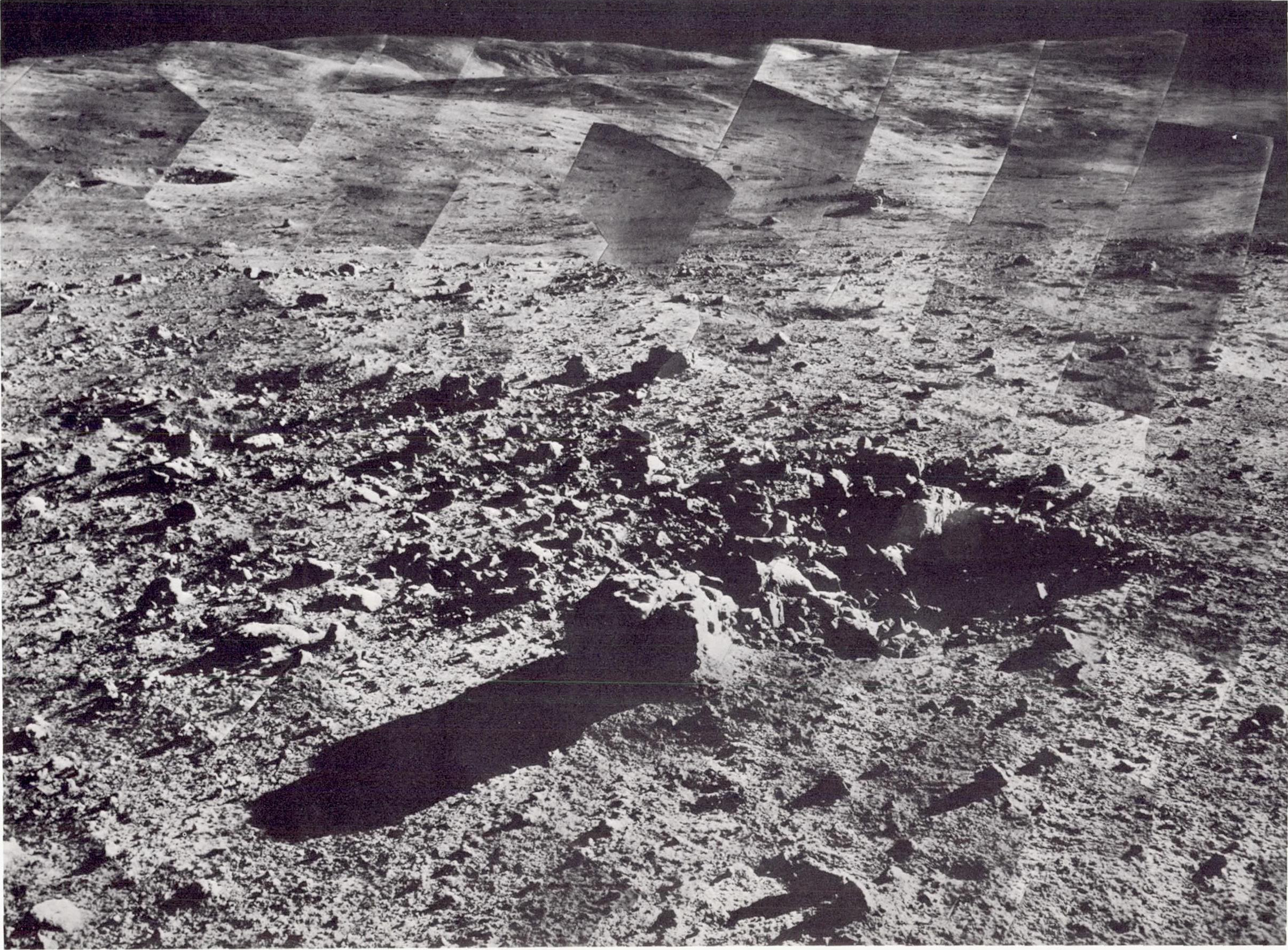
Photomosaic of a panorama taken by Surveyor 7 of its landing site.

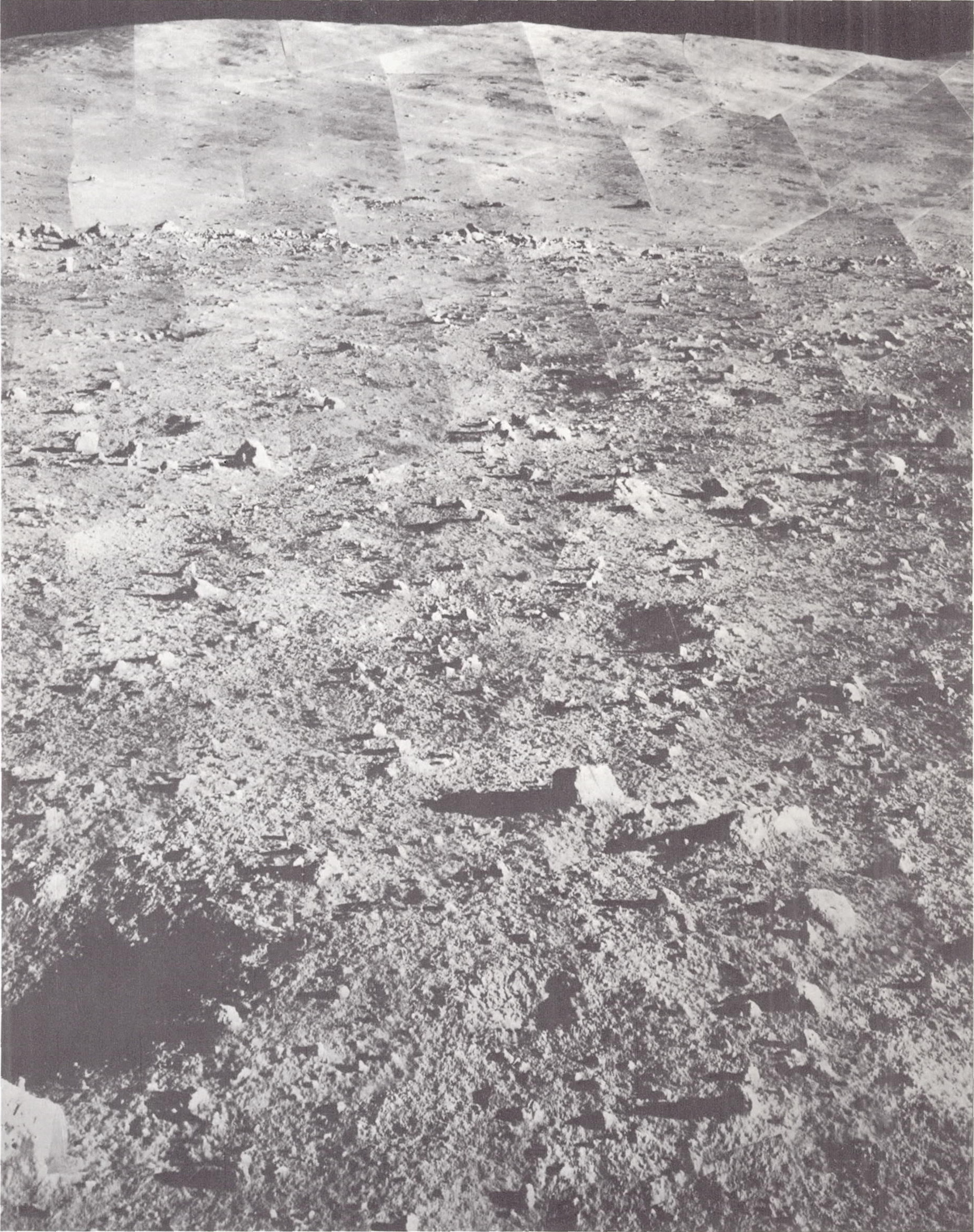
Panorama of the surface

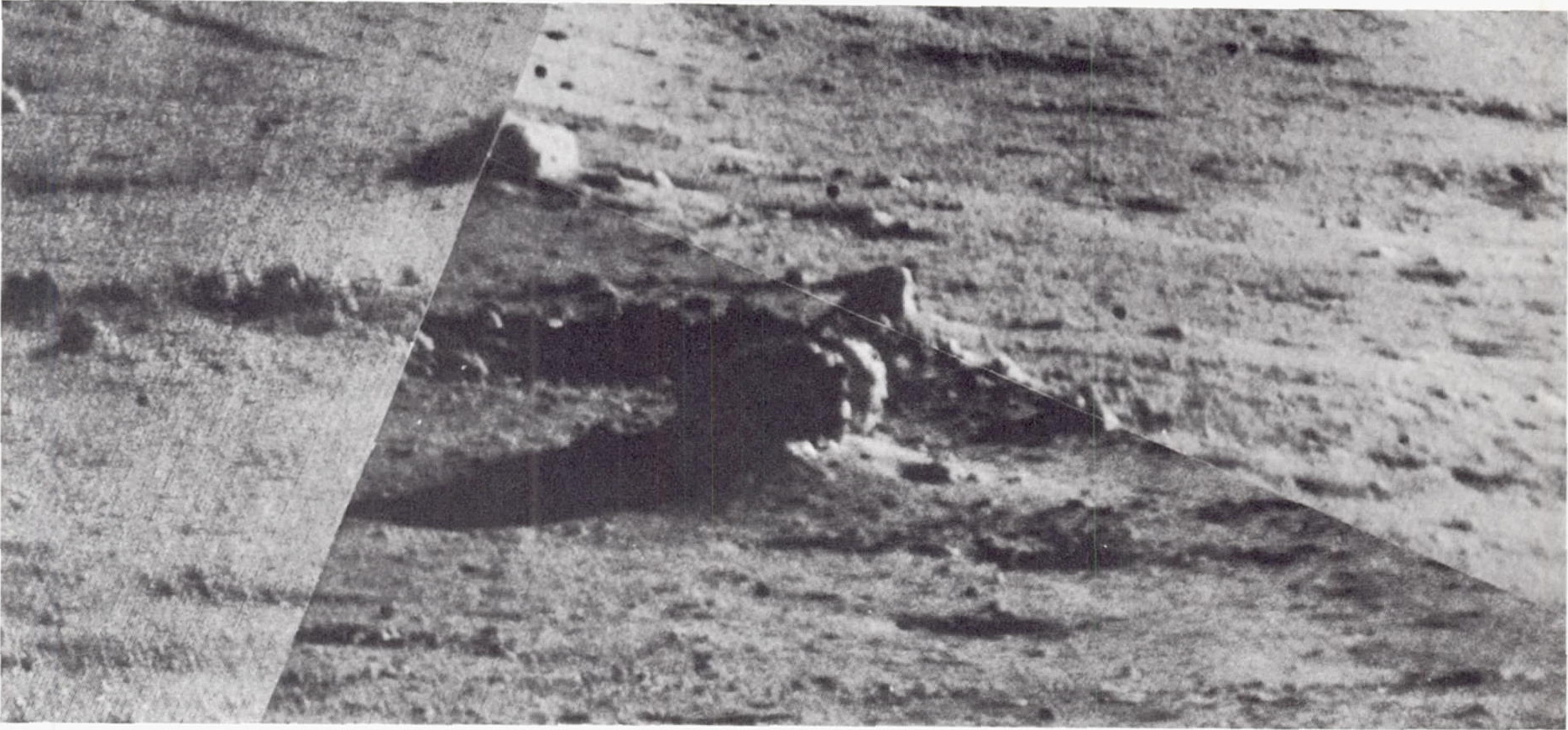
An area 350 meters northeast of the spacecraft, showing a large block about 5 meters across and 2 meters high

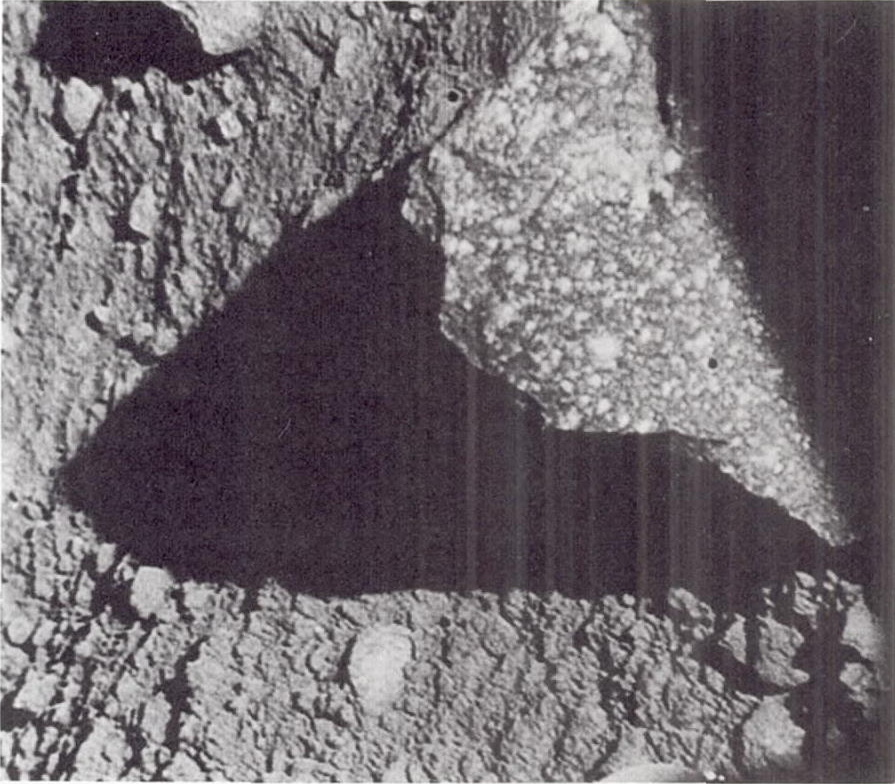
Spotted rock 25 cm across, about 2 meters from Surveyor 7

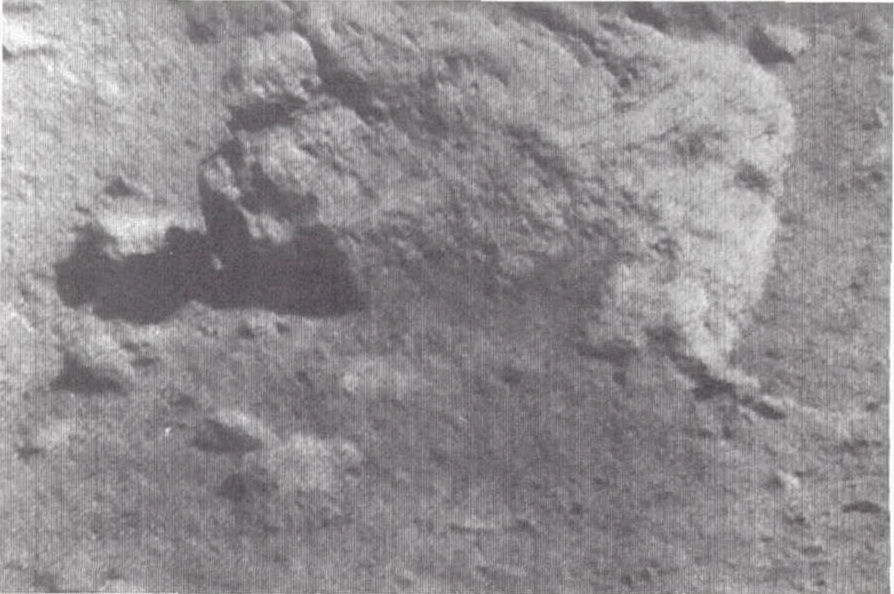
Vesicular fragment about 35 cm across, about 7 meters from Surveyor 7

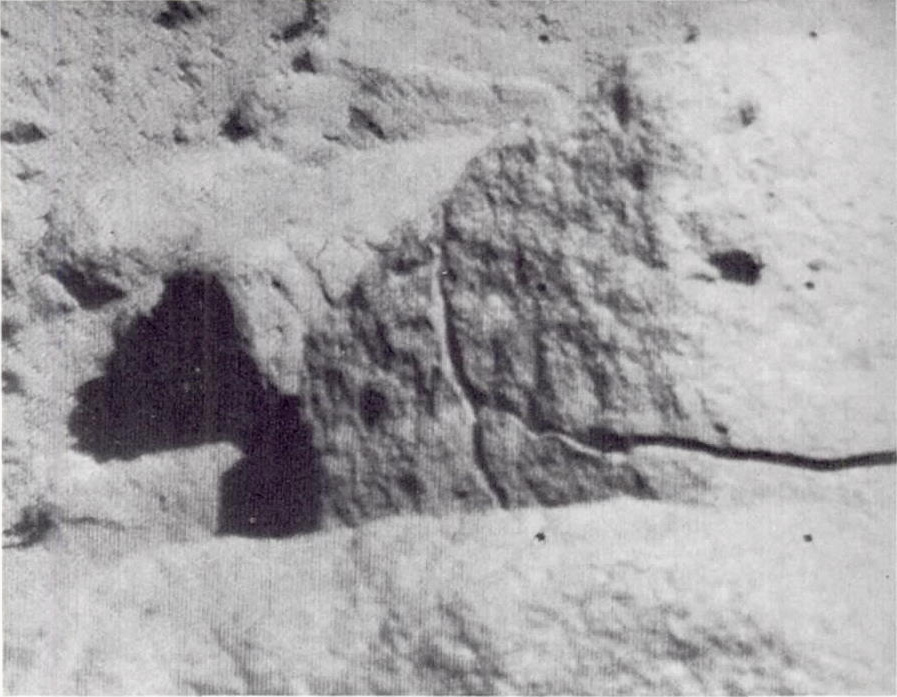
Broken block 30 to 40 cm across, about 2.5 meters from Surveyor 7 camera.

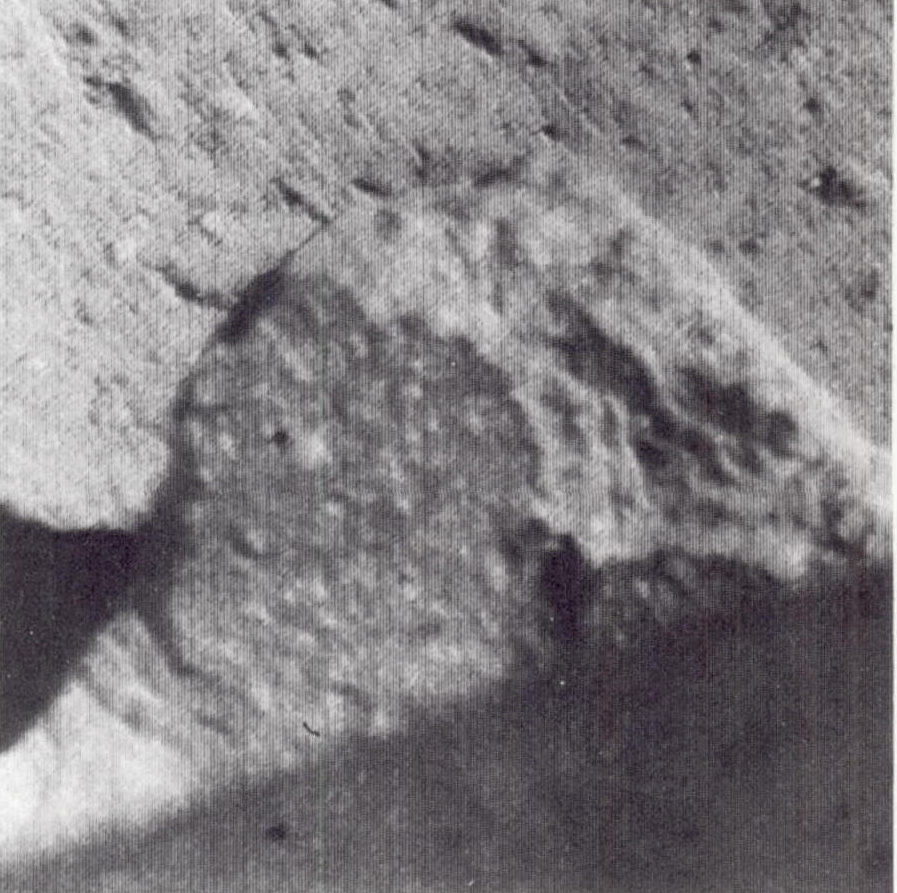
Spotted fragment about 1.5 meters from Surveyor 7 camera. Bright spots have indistinct boundaries and vary from less than 1 mm to about 8 mm across.

=== Alpha-Scattering Surface Analyzer ===
The alpha-scattering surface analyzer was designed to measure directly the abundances of the major elements of the lunar surface. The instrumentation consisted of an alpha source (curium 242) collimated to irradiate a 10 mm diameter opening in the bottom of the instrument where the sample was located and two parallel but independent charged particle detector systems. One system, containing two sensors, detected the energy spectra of the alpha particles scattered from the lunar surface, and the other, containing four sensors, detected energy spectra of the protons produced via reaction (alpha and proton) in the surface material. Each detector assembly was connected to a pulse height analyzer. A digital electronics package, located in a compartment on the spacecraft, continuously telemetered signals to earth whenever the experiment was operating. The spectra contained quantitative information on all major elements in the samples except for hydrogen, helium, and lithium. The experiment provided 46 hours of data accumulated from three lunar surface sample measurements. These measurements were of a portion of undisturbed local lunar surface, a lunar rock, and an extensively trenched area of the lunar surface. Data were obtained during the first and second lunar days, January 12 to 23, 1968, and February 13 to 21, 1968.

The alpha backscattering instrument failed to deploy properly. Mission controllers successfully used the surface soil sampler claw to push the alpha backscattering instrument into the proper position to conduct its experiments.

=== Soil Mechanics Surface Sampler ===
The soil mechanics surface sampler was designed to pick up, dig, scrape, and trench the lunar surface, and transport lunar surface material while being photographed so that the properties of the lunar surface could be determined. The sampler consisted primarily of a scoop with a container, a sharpened blade, and an electric motor to open and close the container. The flat foot of the scoop incorporated two embedded rectangular horseshoe magnets. The scoop was mounted on a pantograph arm that could be extended about 1.5 m or retracted close to the spacecraft motor drive. The arm could also be moved from an azimuth of +40° to -72° or be elevated 130 mm by motor drives. It could also be dropped onto the lunar surface under force provided by gravity and a spring. The scoop was mounted below the television camera in a position that allowed it to reach the alpha-scattering instrument in its deployed position and redeploy it to another selected location. The instrument performed 16 bearing tests, seven trenching tests, and two impact tests. It also freed the alpha-scattering instrument when it failed to deploy on the lunar surface, shaded this instrument, and moved this instrument for evaluation of other samples. Performance was flawless during 36 hours of operation between January 11 and January 23, 1968. The instrument responded to commands on February 14, 1968, which verified that it had survived the lunar night. The power system, however, was unable to support any operations.

== See also ==
- Surveyor program
- Luna programme
- List of artificial objects on the Moon
- List of missions to the Moon
