= (505657) 2014 SR339 =

Asteroid of the Apollo group

(505657) 2014 SR_{339}
- Radar images of 2014 SR_{339} taken by the Arecibo Observatory on 9 February 2018

Discovery
- Discovered by: WISE
- Discovery site: Earth orbit
- Discovery date: 30 September 2014

Designations
- Minor planet category: Apollo · NEO · PHA

Orbital characteristics
- Epoch 23 March 2018 (JD 2458200.5)
- Uncertainty parameter 0
- Observation arc: 3.41 yr (1,245 d)
- Aphelion: 1.6948 AU
- Perihelion: 0.9046 AU
- Semi-major axis: 1.2997 AU
- Eccentricity: 0.3040
- Orbital period (sidereal): 1.48 yr (541 d)
- Mean anomaly: 60.524°
- Mean motion: 0° 39^{m} 54.72^{s} / day
- Inclination: 29.790°
- Longitude of ascending node: 138.78°
- Argument of perihelion: 299.60°
- Earth MOID: 0.0354 AU (13.8 LD)

Physical characteristics
- Dimensions: (>1.5 km × ? km)
- Mean diameter: 0.971±0.367 km
- Synodic rotation period: 8–9 h 8.729 h (Note: lightcurve plot of (505657) 2014 SR339: rotation period 8.729±0.002 hours with a brightness amplitude of 0.93 mag. Quality code of 3-. Summary figures at the Center for Solar System Studies (CS3))
- Geometric albedo: 0.068±0.074
- Spectral type: C (assumed on albedo)
- Absolute magnitude (H): 18.6

(505657) 2014 SR_{339} is a dark and elongated asteroid, classified as a near-Earth object and potentially hazardous asteroid of the Apollo group, approximately 970 meters (3,200 feet) in diameter. It was discovered on 30 September 2014, by NASA's Wide-field Infrared Survey Explorer telescope (WISE) in Earth's orbit. Closely observed at Goldstone and Arecibo in February 2018, it has a rotation period of 8.7 hours.

== Orbit and classification ==
2014 SR_{339} is a member of the Apollo asteroids, which cross the orbit of Earth. Apollo's are the largest group of near-Earth objects with nearly 10 thousand known objects. It orbits the Sun at a distance of 0.90–1.70 AU once every 18 months (541 days; semi-major axis of 1.30 AU). Its orbit has an eccentricity of 0.30 and an inclination of 30° with respect to the ecliptic. With an aphelion of 1.70 AU, it is also a Mars-crosser, as it crosses the orbit of the Red Planet at 1.666 AU. The body's observation arc begins with its official discovery observation by WISE in September 2014.

=== Close approaches ===
As a potentially hazardous asteroid, 2014 SR_{339} has a minimum orbital intersection distance (MOID) with Earth of less than 0.05 AU and a diameter of greater than 150 meters. The Earth-MOID is currently 0.0354 AU (5,300,000 km), which translates into 13.8 lunar distances (LD).

=== 2018 flyby ===
On 7 February 2018 it passed 0.054 AU (21 LD) from the Earth when its apparent magnitude brightened to 14. Goldstone observed it until the following day. While this was an 8.1-million kilometer flyby, the next close flyby of 6.3 million km will occur on 5 February 2058, and another 7.6 million km on 8 February 2095. It will also have a 3.2 million km flyby of Mars on 26 September 2048.

== Physical characteristics ==
The asteroid's spectral type is unknown. Due to its unusually low albedo (see below) it is likely a carbonaceous C-type asteroid.

=== Rotation period ===
On 9 February, radiometric observations by the Arecibo Observatory revealed that the asteroid has an elongated, lumpy shape. The radar images also gave it a rotational period between 8 and 9 hours. A refined period of 8.7 hour agrees with (photometric) lightcurve observations by American photometrist Brian Warner at the Center for Solar System Studies (U82) during 9–11 February 2018, who obtained a period of 8.729 hours with a high brightness amplitude of 0.93 magnitude, which also indicates a non-spheroidal shape (U=3-).

=== Diameter and albedo ===
According to the survey carried out by the NEOWISE mission of NASA's WISE telescope, 2014 SR_{339} measures 0.971 kilometers in diameter and its surface has an albedo of 0.068. During its close approach in February 2018, radiometric observations by Arecibo Observatory determined that the object is at least 1.5 kilometers (0.93 miles) wide. Data from the Arecibo Telescope released in 2022 showed an unusually high radar albedo, possibly indicating rich metal content.

== Numbering and naming ==
This minor planet was numbered by the Minor Planet Center on 4 November 2017 (M.P.C. 107069). As of 2018, it has not been named.

== Gallery ==
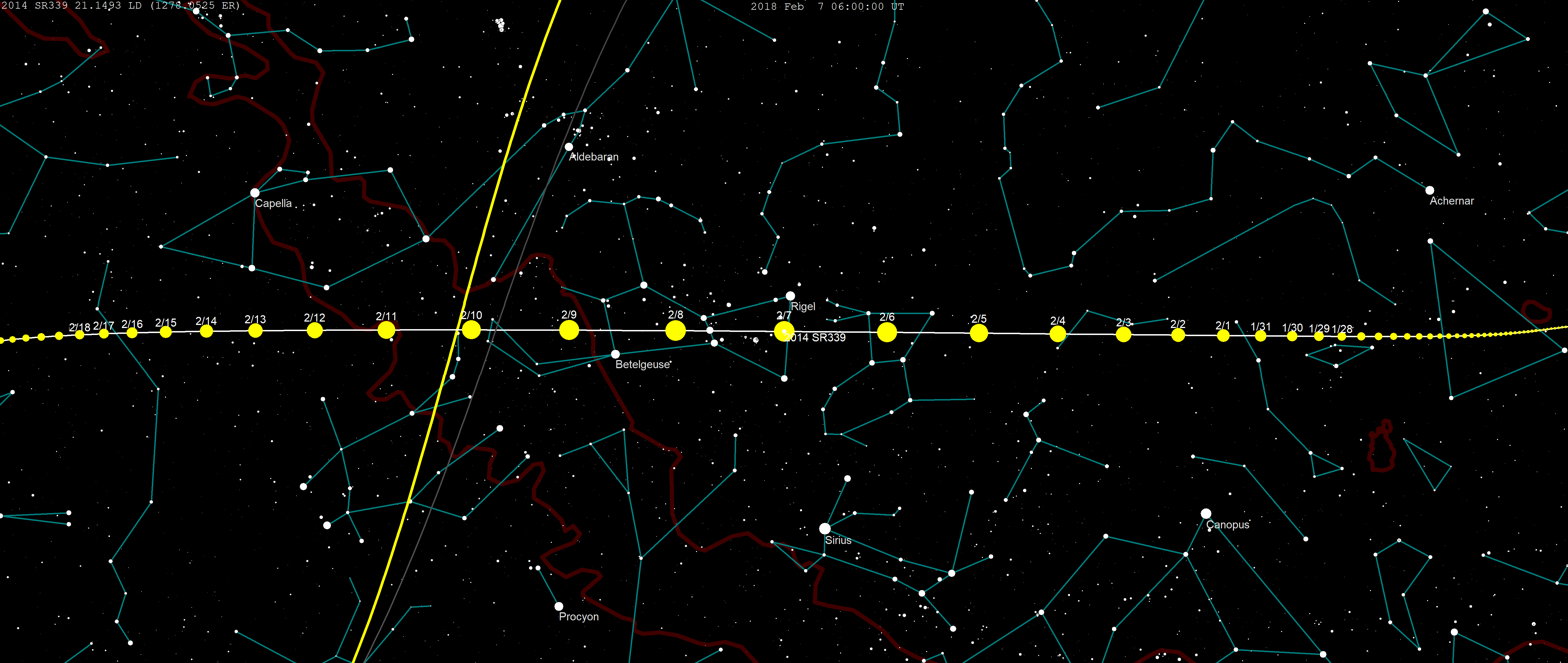
Daily motion of asteroid across sky

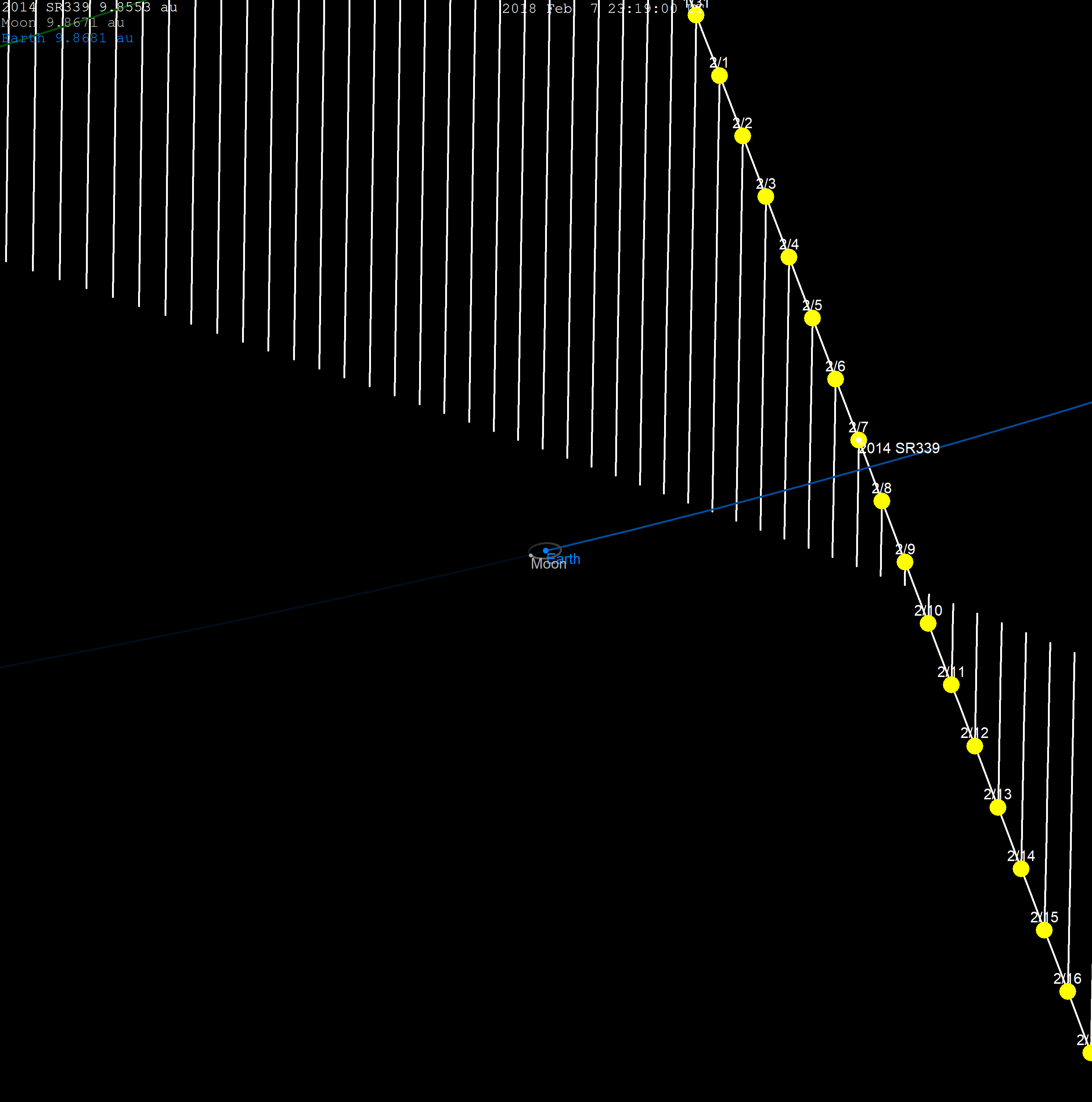
View of flyby above the earth and moon

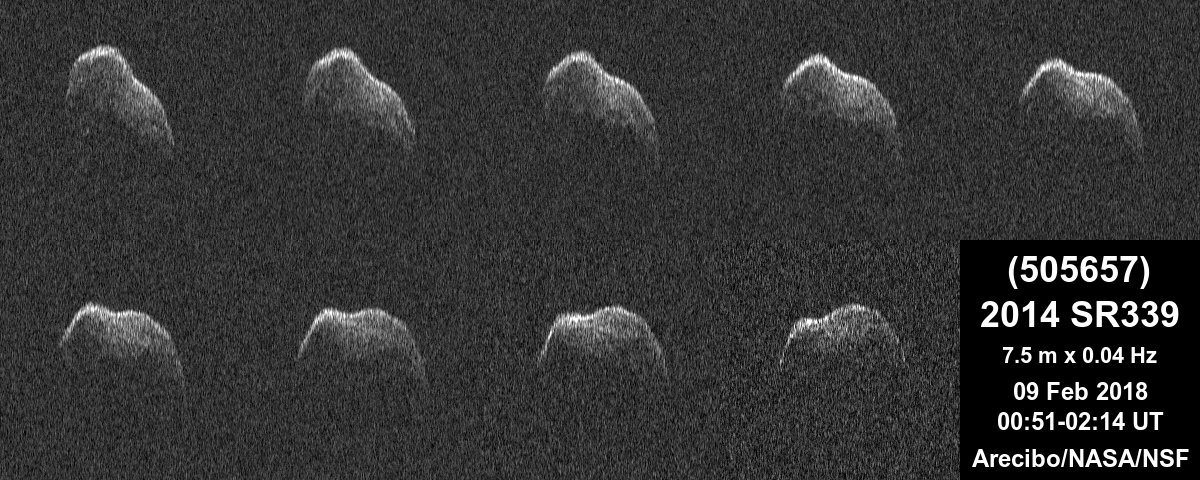
