= Astronomical naming conventions =

Systematic designations to unambiguously identify astronomical objects

In ancient times, only the Sun and Moon, a few stars, and the most easily visible planets had names. Over the last few hundred years, the number of identified astronomical objects has risen from hundreds to over a billion, and more are discovered every year. Astronomers need to be able to assign systematic designations to unambiguously identify all of these objects, and at the same time give names to the most interesting objects, and where relevant, features of those objects.

The International Astronomical Union (IAU) is the recognized authority in astronomy for assigning designations to celestial bodies such as stars, planets, and minor planets, including any surface features on them. In response to the need for unambiguous names for astronomical objects, it has created a number of systematic naming systems for objects of various sorts.

== Stars ==
There are no more than a few thousand stars that appear sufficiently bright in Earth's sky to be visible to the naked eye. This represents the number of stars available to be named by ancient cultures. The upper boundary to what is physiologically possible to be seen with the unaided eye is an apparent magnitude of 6, or about ten thousand stars. With the advent of the increased light-gathering abilities of the telescope, many more stars became visible, far too many to all be given names. The earliest naming system which is still popular is the Bayer designation using the name of constellations to identify the stars within them.

The IAU is the only internationally recognized authority for assigning astronomical designations to celestial objects and surface features on them. The purpose of this is to ensure that names assigned are unambiguous. There have been many historical star catalogues, and new star catalogues are set up on a regular basis as new sky surveys are performed. All designations of objects in recent star catalogues start with an "initialism", which is kept globally unique by the IAU. Different star catalogues then have different naming conventions for what goes after the initialism, but modern catalogs tend to follow a set of generic rules for the data formats used.

The IAU does not recognize the commercial practice of selling fictitious star names by commercial star-naming companies.

=== Proper names ===
There are about 300 to 350 stars with traditional or historical proper names. They tend to be the brightest stars in the sky and are often the most prominent ones of the constellation. Examples are Betelgeuse, Rigel and Vega. Most such names are derived from the Arabic language (see List of Arabic star names § History of Arabic star names).

Stars may have multiple proper names, as many different cultures named them independently. Polaris, for example, has also been known by the names Alruccabah, Angel Stern, Cynosura, the Lodestar, Mismar, Navigatoria, Phoenice, the Pole Star, the Star of Arcady, Tramontana and Yilduz at various times and places by different cultures in human history.

In 2016, the IAU organized a Working Group on Star Names (WGSN) to catalog and standardize proper names for stars. The WGSN's first bulletin of July 2016 included a table of the first two batches of names approved by the WGSN (on 30 June and 20 July 2016) together with names of stars adopted by the IAU Executive Committee Working Group on Public Naming of Planets and Planetary Satellites during the 2015 NameExoWorlds campaign and recognized by the WGSN. Further batches of names were approved on 21 August 2016, 12 September 2016 and 5 October 2016. These were listed in a table included in the WGSN's second bulletin issued in October 2016. The next additions were done on 1 February, 30 June, 5 September and 19 November 2017, and on 6 June 2018. All are included on the current List of IAU-approved Star Names.

The star nearest to Earth is typically referred to simply as "the Sun" or its equivalent in the language being used (for instance, if two astronomers were speaking French, they would call it le Soleil). However, it is usually called by its Latin name, Sol, in science fiction.

==== Named after people ====
There are about two dozen stars such as Barnard's Star and Kapteyn's Star that have historic names and which were named in honor after astronomers. As a result of the NameExoWorlds campaign in December 2015 the IAU approved the names Cervantes (honoring the writer Miguel de Cervantes) and Copernicus (honoring the astronomer Nicolaus Copernicus) for the stars Mu Arae and 55 Cancri A, respectively. In July 2016, the IAU WGSN approved the name Cor Caroli (Latin for 'heart of Charles') for the star Alpha Canum Venaticorum, so named in honour of King Charles I of England by Sir Charles Scarborough, his physician. In 2019, IAU held the NameExoWorlds campaign.

=== Catalogues ===
With the advent of the increased light-gathering abilities of the telescope, many more stars became visible, far too many to all be given names. Instead, they have designations assigned to them by a variety of different star catalogues. Older catalogues either assigned an arbitrary number to each object, or used a simple systematic naming scheme based on the constellation the star lies in, like the older Ptolemy's Almagest in Greek from 150 and Al-Sufi's Book of Fixed Stars in Arabic from 964. The variety of sky catalogues in use means that most bright stars have multiple designations.

In 1540, the Italian astronomer Piccolomini released the book De le Stelle Fisse (On the Fixed Stars) which include star maps of 47 constellations where he numbered the stars in magnitude order using Latin letters.

==== Bayer designation ====
The Bayer designations of about 1,500 brightest stars were first published in 1603. In this list, a star is identified by a lower-case letter of the Greek alphabet, followed by the Latin name of its parent constellation. The Bayer designation uses the possessive form of a constellation's name, which in almost every case ends in is, i or ae; um if the constellation's name is plural (see genitive case for constellations). In addition, a three-letter abbreviation is often used. Examples include Alpha Andromedae (α And) in the constellation of Andromeda, Alpha Centauri (α Cen), in the constellation Centaurus, Alpha Crucis (α Cru) and Beta Crucis (β Cru), the two brightest stars in the constellation Crux, the Southern Cross, Epsilon Carinae (ε Car) in Carina, Lambda Scorpii (λ Sco) in Scorpius and Sigma Sagittarii (σ Sgr) in Sagittarius. After all twenty-four Greek letters have been assigned, upper and lower case Latin letters are used, such as for A Centauri (A Cen), D Centauri (D Cen), G Scorpii (G Sco), P Cygni (P Cyg), b Sagittarii (b Sgr), d Centauri (d Cen) and s Carinae (s Car).

As the resolving power of telescopes increased, numerous objects that were thought to be a single object were found to be optical star systems that were too closely spaced in the sky to be discriminated by the human eye. This led to a third iteration, where numeric superscripts were added to distinguish those previously unresolved stars. Examples include Theta Sagittarii (θ Sgr) later distinguished as Theta^{1} Sagittarii (θ^{1} Sgr) and Theta^{2} Sagittarii (θ^{2} Sgr), each being their own (physical) star system with two and three stars, respectively.

==== Flamsteed designation ====
Flamsteed designations consist of a number and the Latin genitive of the constellation the star lies in. Examples include 51 Pegasi and 61 Cygni. About 2,500 stars are catalogued. They are commonly used when no Bayer designation exists, or when the Bayer designation uses numeric superscripts such as in Rho^{1}Cancri. In this case, the simpler Flamsteed designation, 55 Cancri, is often preferred.

==== Modern catalogues ====
Most modern catalogues are generated by computers, using high-resolution, high-sensitivity telescopes, and as a result describe very large numbers of objects. For example, the Guide Star Catalog II has entries on over 998 million distinct astronomical objects. Objects in these catalogs are typically located with very high resolution, and assign designations to these objects based on their position in the sky. An example of such a designation is SDSSp J153259.96−003944.1, where the initialism SDSSp indicates that the designation is from the "Sloan Digital Sky Survey preliminary objects", and the other characters indicate celestial coordinates (epoch 'J', right ascension 15^{h}32^{m}59.96^{s}, declination −00°39′44.1″).

=== Variable stars ===
Variable stars are assigned designations in a variable star scheme that is based on a variation of the Bayer designation format, with an identifying label preceding the Latin genitive of the name of the constellation in which the star lies. Such designations mark them as variable stars. Examples include R Cygni, RR Lyrae, and V1331 Cygni. The International Astronomical Union delegates the task to the Sternberg Astronomical Institute in Moscow, Russia.

=== Compact stars ===
==== Pulsars ====
Pulsars such as PSR J0737-3039, are designated with a "PSR" prefix, that stands for Pulsating Source of Radio. The prefix is followed by the pulsar's right ascension and degrees of declination. The right ascension is also prefixed with a "J" (Julian epoch) or a "B" (Besselian Epochs) used prior to 1993, as in PSR B1257+12.

==== Black holes ====
Black holes have no consistent naming conventions. Supermassive black holes receive the designation of the galaxy whose core they reside in. Examples are NGC 4261, NGC 4151 and M31, which derive their designation from the New General Catalogue and the list of Messier objects. Sometimes an asterisk (pronounced star) will be added after the name of the galaxy or region where a supermassive black hole resides to refer specifically to the black hole rather than the entire galaxy; examples include Messier 87* and Sagittarius A*.

Other black holes, such as Cygnus X-1, a stellar black hole, are cataloged by their constellation and the order in which they were discovered—in this case, Cygnus for the constellation where the black hole can be found, X for X-ray source, and 1 indicating that it was the first X-ray source to be discovered in that constellation. A large number of black holes are designated by their position in the sky and prefixed with the instrument or survey that discovered them. Examples are SDSS J0100+2802 (where SDSS stands for Sloan Digital Sky Survey), and RX J1131−1231, observed by the Chandra X-ray Observatory.

=== Supernovae ===
Supernova discoveries are reported to the IAU's Central Bureau for Astronomical Telegrams and are automatically given a provisional designation based on the co-ordinates of the discovery. Historically, when supernovae are identified as belonging to a "type", CBAT has also published circulars with assigned year–letter designations, and discovery details. A supernova's permanent designation is formed by the standard prefix "SN", the year of discovery, and a suffix composed of one to three letters of the Latin alphabet. The first 26 supernovae of the year receive a capital letter from A to Z. Subsequent supernovae of that year are designated with pairs of lower-case letters from "aa" to "az", and then continuing with "ba" until "zz". Then come "aaa", "aab", and so on (this first occurred in 2015–2016). For example, the prominent SN 1987A, was the first one to be observed in 1987, while SN 2023ixf was one of the brightest ever observed in recent times. Several thousand supernovae have been reported since 1885. In recent years, several supernova discovery projects have retained their more distant supernova discoveries for in-house follow-up, and not reported them to CBAT. Starting in 2015, CBAT has scaled back its efforts to publish assigned designations of typed supernovae: By September 2014, CBAT had published names and details of 100 supernovae discovered in that year. By September 2015, CBAT had only published names of 20 supernovae discovered in that year. The Astronomer's Telegram provides some surrogate services independent from CBAT.

Four historical supernovae are known simply by the year they occurred: SN 1006 (the brightest stellar event ever recorded), SN 1054 (of which the remnant is the Crab Nebula and the Crab Pulsar), SN 1572 (Tycho's Nova), and SN 1604 (Kepler's Star).

Since 1885, the letter-suffixes are explicitly assigned, regardless whether only one supernova is detected during the entire year (although this has not occurred since 1947). Driven by advances in technology and increases in observation time in the early 21st century, hundreds of supernovae were reported every year to the IAU, with more than 500 catalogued in 2007. Since then, the number of newly discovered supernovae has increased to thousands per year, for example almost 16,000 supernovae observations were reported in 2019, more than 2,000 of which were named by CBAT.

== Constellations ==
The sky was divided into constellations by historic astronomers, according to perceived patterns in the sky. At first, only the shapes of the patterns were defined, and the names and numbers of constellations varied from one star map to another. Despite being scientifically meaningless, they do provide useful reference points in the sky for human beings, including astronomers. In 1930, the boundaries of these constellations were fixed by Eugène Joseph Delporte and adopted by the IAU, so that now every point on the celestial sphere belongs to a particular constellation.

== Galaxies ==
Like stars, most galaxies do not have names. There are a few exceptions such as the Andromeda Galaxy, the Whirlpool Galaxy, and others, but most simply have a catalog number.

In the 19th century, the exact nature of galaxies was not yet understood, and the early catalogs simply grouped together open clusters, globular clusters, nebulas, and galaxies: the Messier catalog has 110 in total. The Andromeda Galaxy is Messier object 31, or M31; the Whirlpool Galaxy is M51. The New General Catalogue (NGC, J. L. E. Dreyer 1888) was much larger and contained nearly 8,000 objects, still mixing galaxies with nebulas and star clusters.

== Planets ==
The brightest planets in the sky have been named from ancient times. The scientific names are taken from the names given by the Romans: Mercury, Venus, Mars, Jupiter, and Saturn. Our own planet is usually named in English as Earth, or the equivalent in the language being spoken (for instance, two astronomers speaking French would call it la Terre). However, it is only recently in human history that it has been thought of as a planet. Earth, when viewed as a planet, is sometimes also called by its Latin scientific conventional name Terra; this name is especially prevalent in science fiction where the adjective "terran" is also used in the way which "Lunar" or "Jovian" is for Earth's moon or Jupiter. The Latin convention derives from the use of that language as an international scientific language by the first modern astronomers like Copernicus, Kepler, Galileo, Newton and others and was used for a long time. This is why the later discovered bodies were also named accordingly. Two more bodies that were discovered later, and considered planets when discovered, are still generally considered planets now:

- Uranus, discovered by William Herschel in 1781
- Neptune, discovered by Johann Gottfried Galle in 1846 (based on prediction by Urbain Le Verrier)

These were given names from Greek or Roman myth, to match the ancient planet names—but only after some controversy. For example, Sir William Herschel discovered Uranus in 1781, and originally called it Georgium Sidus (George's Star) in honour of King George III of the United Kingdom. French astronomers began calling it Herschel before German Johann Bode proposed the name Uranus, after the Greek god. The name "Uranus" did not come into common usage until around 1850.

Derived from Western Classical mythology, these names are only considered standard in Western discussion of the planets. Astronomers in societies that have other traditional names for the planets may use those names in scientific discourse. For instance, IAU does not disapprove of astronomers discussing Jupiter in Arabic using the traditional Arabic name for the planet, المشتري Al-Mushtarīy.

In science fiction planets are sometimes numbered analogues to the historic system of numbering moons with roman numerals, but in order from the parent star, e.g. Sol III for Earth.

=== First minor planets ===
Starting in 1801, asteroids were discovered between Mars and Jupiter. The first few (Ceres, Pallas, Juno, Vesta) were initially considered planets. As more and more were discovered, they were soon stripped of their planetary status. On the other hand, Pluto was considered to be a planet at the time of its discovery in 1930, as it was found beyond Neptune. Following this pattern, several hypothetical bodies were given names: Vulcan for a planet within the orbit of Mercury; Phaeton for a planet between Mars and Jupiter that was believed to be the precursor of the asteroids; Themis for a moon of Saturn; and Persephone, and several other names, for a trans-Plutonian planet.

Some sixty years after the discovery of Pluto, a large number of large trans-Neptunian objects began to be discovered. Under the criteria of classifying these Kuiper belt objects (KBOs), it became dubious whether Pluto would have been considered a planet had it been discovered in the 1990s. Its mass is now known to be much smaller than once thought and, with the discovery of Eris, it is simply one of the two largest known trans-Neptunian objects. In 2006, Pluto was therefore reclassified into a different class of astronomical bodies known as dwarf planets, along with Eris and others.

=== Exoplanets ===
Currently, according to the IAU, there is no agreed upon system for designating exoplanets (planets orbiting other stars). The process of naming them is organized by the IAU Executive Committee Working Group Public Naming of Planets and Planetary Satellites. The scientific nomenclature for the designations usually consists of a proper noun or abbreviation that often corresponds to the star's name, followed by a lowercase letter (starting with 'b'), like 51 Pegasi b.

The lowercase lettering style is drawn from the IAU's long-established rules for naming binary and multiple star systems. A primary star, which is brighter and typically bigger than its companion stars, is designated by a capitalized A. Its companions are labelled B, C, and so on. For example, Sirius, the brightest star in the sky, is actually a double star, consisting of the naked-eye visible Sirius A and its dim white-dwarf companion Sirius B. The first exoplanet tentatively identified around the second brightest star in the triple star system Alpha Centauri is accordingly called Alpha Centauri Bb. If an exoplanet orbits both of the stars in a binary system, its name can be, for example, Kepler-34(AB) b.

=== Natural satellites ===
Earth's natural satellite is simply known as the Moon, or the equivalent in the language being spoken (for instance, two astronomers speaking French would call it la Lune). English-language science fiction often adopts the Latin name "Luna" while using the English "Moon" as a term for natural satellites in general in order to better distinguish the wider concept from any specific example. Natural satellites of other planets are generally named after mythological figures related to their parent body's namesake, such as Phobos and Deimos, the twin sons of Ares (Mars), or the Galilean moons of Io, Europa, Ganymede, and Callisto, four consorts of Zeus (Jupiter). Satellites of Uranus are instead named after characters from works by William Shakespeare or Alexander Pope, such as Umbriel or Titania.

When natural satellites are first discovered, they are given provisional designations such as "S/2010 J 2" (the 2nd new satellite of Jupiter discovered in 2010) or "S/2003 S 1" (the 1st new satellite of Saturn discovered in 2003). The initial "S/" stands for "satellite", and distinguishes from such prefixes as "D/", "C/", and "P/", used for comets. The designation "R/" is used for planetary rings. These designations are sometimes written like "S/2003 S1", dropping the second space. The letter following the category and year identifies the planet (Jupiter, Saturn, Uranus, Neptune; although no occurrence of the other planets is expected, Mars and Mercury are disambiguated through the use of Hermes for the latter). Pluto was designated by P prior to its recategorization as a dwarf planet. When the object is found around a minor planet, the identifier used is the latter's number in parentheses. Thus, Dactyl, the moon of 243 Ida, was at first designated "S/1993 (243) 1". Once confirmed and named, it became (243) Ida I Dactyl. Similarly, the fourth satellite of Pluto, Kerberos, discovered after Pluto was categorized as a dwarf planet and assigned a minor planet number, was designated S/2011 (134340) 1 rather than S/2011 P 1, though the New Horizons team, who disagreed with the dwarf planet classification, used the latter.

- H = Mercury (Hermes) (Note: The assignment of "H" for Mercury is specified by the "USGS Gazetteer of Planetary Nomenclature".; since the USGS usually closely follows IAU guidelines, this is very likely the IAU convention, but confirmation is needed.)
- V = Venus
- E = Earth
- M = Mars
- J = Jupiter
- S = Saturn
- U = Uranus
- N = Neptune

After a few months or years, when a newly discovered satellite's existence has been confirmed and its orbit computed, a permanent name is chosen, which replaces the "S/" provisional designation. However, in the past, some satellites remained unnamed for surprisingly long periods after their discovery. See Naming of moons for a history of how some of the major satellites got their current names.

The Roman numbering system arose with the very first discovery of natural satellites other than Earth's: Galileo referred to the Galilean moons as I through IV (counting from Jupiter outward), in part to spite his rival Simon Marius, who had proposed the names now adopted, after his own proposal to name the bodies after members of the Medici family failed to win currency. Similar numbering schemes naturally arose with the discovery of moons around Saturn and Mars. Although the numbers initially designated the moons in orbital sequence, new discoveries soon failed to conform with this scheme (e.g. "Jupiter V" is Amalthea, which orbits closer to Jupiter than does Io). The unstated convention then became, at the close of the 19th century, that the numbers more or less reflected the order of discovery, except for prior historical exceptions (see the Timeline of discovery of Solar System planets and their moons).

=== Geological and geographical features ===
In addition to naming planets and satellites themselves, the individual geological and geographical features such as craters, mountains, and volcanoes, on those planets and satellites also need to be named.

In the early days, only a very limited number of features could be seen on other Solar System bodies other than the Moon. Craters on the Moon could be observed with even some of the earliest telescopes, and 19th-century telescopes could make out some features on Mars. Jupiter had its famous Great Red Spot, also visible through early telescopes.

In 1919, the IAU was formed, and it appointed a committee to regularize the chaotic lunar and Martian nomenclatures then current. Much of the work was done by Mary Adela Blagg, and the report Named Lunar Formations by Blagg and Muller (1935), was the first systematic listing of lunar nomenclature. Later, "The System of Lunar Craters, quadrants I, II, III, IV" was published, under the direction of Gerard P. Kuiper. These works were adopted by the IAU and became the recognized sources for lunar nomenclature.

The Martian nomenclature was clarified in 1958, when a committee of the IAU recommended for adoption the names of 128 albedo features (bright, dark, or colored) observed through ground-based telescopes (IAU, 1960). These names were based on a system of nomenclature developed in the late 19th century by the Italian astronomer Giovanni V. Schiaparelli (1879) and expanded in the early 20th century by Eugene M. Antoniadi (1929), a Greek-born astronomer working at Meudon, France.

However, the age of space probes brought high-resolution images of various Solar System bodies, and it became necessary to propose naming standards for the features seen on them.

== Minor planets ==
Initially, the names given to minor planets followed the same pattern as the other planets: names from Greek or Roman myths, with a preference for female names. With the discovery in 1898 of the first body found to cross the orbit of Mars, a different choice was deemed appropriate, and 433 Eros was chosen. This started a pattern of female names for main-belt bodies and male names for those with unusual orbits.

As more and more discoveries were made over the years, this system was eventually recognized as being inadequate and a new one was devised. Currently, the responsibility for naming minor planets lies with the Working Group Small Bodies Nomenclature (WGSBN, originally the Committee Small Bodies Nomenclature, CSBN, and before that the Minor Planet Names Committee, MPNC), which is composed of 15 members, 11 of whom are voting members, while the other four are representatives for the Working Group for Planetary System Nomenclature, the Minor Planet Center, as well as the IAU President and General Secretary. Minor planets observed over at least two nights and which cannot be identified with an existing celestial object, are initially assigned provisional designations (containing the year and the sequential order of discovery within that year) by the Minor Planet Center. When enough observations of the same object are obtained to calculate a reliable orbit, a sequential number is assigned by the Minor Planet Center to the minor-planet designation.

After the designation is assigned, the discoverer is given an opportunity to propose a name, which, if accepted by the IAU, replaces the provisional designation. Thus for instance, (28978) 2001 KX_{76} was given the name Ixion and is now referred to as 28978 Ixion. The name becomes official after its publication in the WGSBN Bulletin with a brief citation explaining its significance. This may be a few years after the initial sighting, or in the case of "lost" asteroids, it may take several decades before they are spotted again and finally assigned a designation. If a minor planet remains unnamed ten years after it has been given a designation, the right to name it is given also to identifiers of the various apparitions of the object, to discoverers at apparitions other than the official one, to those whose observations contributed extensively to the orbit determination, or to representatives of the observatory at which the official discovery was made. The WGSBN has the right to act on its own in naming a minor planet, which often happens when the number assigned to the body is an integral number of thousands.

In recent years, automated search efforts such as LINEAR or LONEOS have discovered so many thousands of new asteroids that the WGSBN has officially limited naming to a maximum of two names per discoverer every two months. Thus, the overwhelming majority of asteroids currently discovered are not assigned formal names.

Under IAU rules, names must be pronounceable, preferably one word (such as 5535 Annefrank), although exceptions are possible (such as 9007 James Bond and 17602 Dr. G.), and since 1982, names are limited to a maximum of 16 characters, including spaces and hyphens. (This rule was violated once for the comet-asteroid 4015 Wilson–Harrington, whose name has 17 characters; this is because it had already been named as a comet before being rediscovered as an asteroid.) Letters with diacritics are accepted, although in English the diacritical marks are usually omitted in everyday usage. 4090 Říšehvězd is an asteroid with the most diacritics (four). Military and political leaders are unsuitable unless they have been dead for at least 100 years. Names of pet animals are discouraged, but there are some from the past. Names of people, companies or products known only for success in business are not accepted, nor are citations that resemble advertising.

Whimsical names can be used for relatively ordinary asteroids (such as 26858 Misterrogers or 274301 Wikipedia), but those belonging to certain dynamical groups are expected to follow more strictly defined naming schemes.

- Near-Earth objects (such as 1862 Apollo) receive mythological names, except those associated with creation or the underworld, while distant Amor asteroid (with perihelion larger than 1.15 au) may receive non-mythical names.
- Jupiter trojans (objects in a 1:1 orbital resonance with Jupiter) are named for characters of the legendary Trojan War. Asteroids at Lagrangian point L_{4} are named after Greek characters (such as 588 Achilles), whilst asteroids at L_{5} are named after Trojans (such as 884 Priamus). Small Jupiter trojans with absolute magnitudes fainter than 12 (in the V band) can be named for Olympic and Paralympic athletes.
- Centaurs (such as 2060 Chiron) crossing or approaching the orbit of a giant planet, but not in a stabilizing resonance are named for the creatures, part horse and part man, from Greek mythology.
- Neptune trojans (objects in a 1:1 orbital resonance with Neptune, such as 385571 Otrera) are named for Amazons, with no differentiation between objects in L_{4} and L_{5}.
- Plutinos (such as 90482 Orcus) are named after mythological figures associated with the underworld.
- Other trans-Neptunian objects (such as 50000 Quaoar), including classical Kuiper belt objects, are given mythological or mythic names (not necessarily from Greek or Roman mythology), particularly those associated with creation.

Since November 2025, minor planets can no longer be named within the first three months after being numbered. This is to ensure that the discovery information is correct and that all available observations of the objects have been identified.

== Comets ==
The names given to comets have followed several different conventions over the past two centuries. Before any systematic naming convention was adopted, comets were named in a variety of ways. The first one to be named was "Halley's Comet" (now officially known as Comet Halley), named after Edmond Halley, who had calculated its orbit. Similarly, the second known periodic comet, Comet Encke (formally designated 2P/Encke), was named after the astronomer, Johann Franz Encke, who had calculated its orbit rather than the original discoverer of the comet, Pierre Méchain. Other comets that bore the possessive include "Biela's Comet" (3D/Biela) and "Miss Herschel's Comet" (35P/Herschel–Rigollet, or Comet Herschel–Rigollet). Most bright (non-periodic) comets were referred to as 'The Great Comet Of...' the year in which they appeared.

In the early 20th century, the convention of naming comets after their discoverers became common, and this remains today. A comet is named after its first independent discoverers, up to a maximum of three names, separated by hyphens. The IAU prefers to credit at most two discoverers, and it credits more than three discoverers only when "in rare cases where named lost comets are identified with a rediscovery that has already received a new name". In recent years, many comets have been discovered by instruments operated by large teams of astronomers, and in this case, comets may be named for the instrument (for example, Comet IRAS–Araki–Alcock (C/1983 H1) was discovered independently by the IRAS satellite and amateur astronomers Genichi Araki and George Alcock). Comet 105P/Singer Brewster, discovered by Stephen Singer-Brewster, should by rights have been named "105P/Singer-Brewster", but this could be misinterpreted as a joint discovery by two astronomers named Singer and Brewster, respectively, so the hyphen was replaced by a space. The spaces, apostrophes and other characters in discoverer names are preserved in comet names, like 32P/Comas Solà, 6P/d'Arrest, 53P/Van Biesbroeck, Comet van den Bergh (1974g), 66P/du Toit, or 57P/du Toit–Neujmin–Delporte.

Until 1994, the systematic naming of comets (the "Old Style") involved first giving them a provisional designation of the year of their discovery followed by a lower case letter indicating its order of discovery in that year (e.g. the first Comet Bennett is 1969i, the 9th comet discovered in 1969). In 1987, more than 26 comets were discovered, so the alphabet was used again with a "1" subscript, very much like what is still done with asteroids (an example is Comet Skorichenko–George, 1989e1). The record year was 1989, which went as high as 1989h1. Once an orbit had been established, the comet was given a permanent designation in order of time of perihelion passage, consisting of the year followed by a Roman numeral. For example, Comet Bennett (1969i) became 1970 II.

Increasing numbers of comet discoveries made this procedure difficult to operate, and in 2003 the IAU's Committee on Small Body Nomenclature approved a new naming system, and in its 1994 General Assembly the IAU approved a new designation system that entered into force in 1995 January 1. Comets are now designated by the year of their discovery followed by a letter indicating the half-month of the discovery (A denotes the first half of January, B denotes the second half of January, C denotes the first half of February, D denotes the second half of February, and so on) and a number indicating the order of discovery. To exemplify, the fourth comet discovered in the second half of February 2006 would be designated 2006 D4. "I" and "Z" are not used when describing the half of a particular month the comet was discovered. Prefixes are also added to indicate the nature of the comet, with P/ indicating a periodic comet, C/ indicating a non-periodic comet, X/ indicating a comet for which no reliable orbit could be calculated (typically comets described in historical chronicles), D/ indicating a comet that has broken up or been lost, and A/ indicating an object at first thought to be a comet but later reclassified as an asteroid (C/2017 U1 became A/2017 U1, then finally 1I/ʻOumuamua). Objects on hyperbolic orbits that do not show cometary activity also receive an A/ designation (example: A/2018 C2, which became C/2018 C2 (Lemmon) when cometary activity was detected). Periodic comets also have a number indicating the order of their discovery. Thus Bennett's Comet has the systematic designation C/1969 Y1. Halley's Comet, the first comet to be identified as periodic, has the systematic name 1P/1682 Q1. Comet Hale–Bopp's systematic name is C/1995 O1. The famous Comet Shoemaker–Levy 9 was the ninth periodic comet jointly discovered by Carolyn Shoemaker, Eugene Shoemaker, and David Levy (the Shoemaker–Levy team has also discovered four non-periodic comets interspersed with the periodic ones), but its systematic name is D/1993 F2 (it was discovered in 1993 and the prefix "D/" is applied, because it was observed to crash into Jupiter).

Some comets were first spotted as minor planets, and received a temporary designation accordingly before cometary activity was later discovered. This is the reason for such comets as P/1999 XN120 (Catalina 2) or P/2004 DO29 (Spacewatch–LINEAR). The MPECs and HTML version of IAUCs, because of their telegraphic style, "flatten out" the subscripts, but the PDF version of IAUCs and some other sources such as the Yamamoto Circulars and the Kometnyj Tsirkular use them.

== Planetary systems ==
The planetary system around the Sun is called Solar System, using the Latin name of the Sun. In science fiction it has sometimes also been called Sol system.

Likewise planetary systems are generally called after their parent stars.

== See also ==
- List of adjectivals and demonyms of astronomical bodies
- List of astronomical objects named after people
- List of basic astronomy topics
- List of brightest stars
- List of minor planets (includes asteroids)
- NameExoWorlds
- Planetary nomenclature
- Proper names (astronomy)
- Provisional designation in astronomy
- Local (astronomy)
