= List of geological features on Ida and Dactyl =

This is a list of named geological features on asteroid 243 Ida and its moon, Dactyl.

== Ida ==
=== Craters ===
Idaean craters are named after famous caves.

Crater	Coordinates	Diameter (km)	Approval Date	Named After	Ref
Afon	6.5°S -0°E	0.8	1994	Novy Afon Cave, Abkhazia	WGPSN
Atea	5.7°S 18.9°W	2	1997	Atea Cave, Papua New Guinea	WGPSN
Azzurra	30.5°N 217.2°W	9.6	1997	Azzurra Grotto, Italy	WGPSN
Bilemot	27.8°S 29.2°W	1.8	1997	Bilemot Cave, Korea	WGPSN
Castellana	13.4°S 335.2°W	5.2	1997	Castellana Cave, Italy	WGPSN
Choukoutien	12.8°N 23.6°W	1.1	1997	Choukoutien, China	WGPSN
Fingal	13.2°S 39.9°W	1.5	1997	Fingal's Cave, UK	WGPSN
Kartchner	7°S 179°W	0.9	1997	Kartchner Caverns, AZ, United States	WGPSN
Kazumura	32°S 41.1°W	2.1	1997	Kazumura Cave, HI, United States	WGPSN
Lascaux	0.8°N 161.2°W	11.8	1997	Lascaux Cave, France	WGPSN
Lechuguilla	7.9°N 357.1°W	1.5	1997	Lechuguilla Cave, NM, United States	WGPSN
Mammoth	18.3°S 180.3°W	10.2	1997	Mammoth Cave, KY, United States	WGPSN
Manjang	28.3°S 90.5°W	1	1997	Manjang Cave, Korea	WGPSN
Orgnac	6.3°S 202.7°W	10.6	1997	Orgnac Cave, France	WGPSN
Padirac	4.3°S 5.2°W	1.9	1997	Padirac Cave, France	WGPSN
Peacock	2°S 52°W	0.2	1997	Peacock Cave, FL, United States	WGPSN
Postojna	42.9°S 359.9°W	6	1997	Postojna Cave, Slovenia	WGPSN
Sterkfontein	4.1°S 54.1°W	4.7	1997	Sterkfontein, South Africa	WGPSN
Stiffe	27.9°S 126.5°W	1.5	1997	Stiffe Cave, Italy	WGPSN
Undara	2°N 113.8°W	8.5	1997	Undara Cave, Australia	WGPSN
Viento	12.2°N 343.9°W	1.6	1997	Viento Cave, Spain	WGPSN

=== Dorsa ===
Dorsum	Coordinates	Diameter (km)	Approval Date	Named After	Ref
Townsend Dorsum	25°N 30°W	40	1997	Tim E. Townsend, a member of the Galileo probe imaging team	WGPSN

=== Regiones ===
Idaean regiones (geologically distinct areas) are named after the discoverer of the asteroid, and the places where he worked.

Regio	Coordinates	Diameter (km)	Approval Date	Named After	Ref
Palisa Regio	23°S 34°W	23	1997	Johann Palisa	WGPSN
Pola Regio	11°S 184°W	8	1997	Pola, Croatia	WGPSN
Vienna Regio	8°N 2°W	13	1997	Vienna	WGPSN

== Dactyl ==
Dactylian craters are named after the mythological Dactyls.

Crater	Coordinates	Diameter (km)	Approval Date	Named After	Ref
Acmon	39°S 138°W	0.3	1997	Acmon	WGPSN
Celmis	46°S 220°W	0.2	1997	Celmis	WGPSN
