= Pola Regio =

Region on asteroid 243 Ida

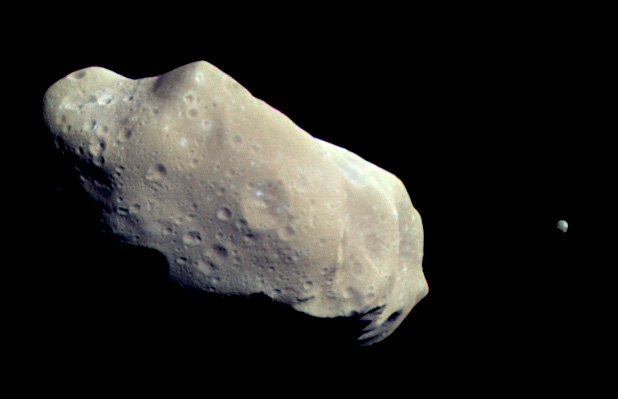
- Pola Regio is located at the right side of 243 Ida. The small object to the right is Ida's moon Dactyl
- Feature type: Region
- Location: 243 Ida
- Coordinates: 11.00°S 176.00°W
- Diameter: 8 kilometres (5.0 mi)
- Discoverer: Galileo
- Naming: Pula, Croatia

Pola Regio is a geological structure on 243 Ida, a main belt asteroid. It was named after Pula (Pola), the place where Austrian astronomer Johann Palisa discovered Ida on 29 September 1884; this name was officially approved by the International Astronomical Union (IAU) in 1997. It is located on Ida's 180° E end, antipodal to Vienna Regio.

== Characteristics ==
Pola Regio lacks the heavily degraded impact craters that characterize much of Ida's surface. The region is located in a distinct region of Ida that hosts several large impact craters, possibly pointing to a structural dichotomy of the asteroid. It has several groove features and a generally disrupted nature. The grooves appear as roughly parallel sets of troughs and pit chains, similar to the larger grooves on Mars's moon Phobos. Groove features on asteroids may form due to seismic shocks from large impact events that create fractures, though the degree of fracturing depends heavily on the asteroid's internal structure.

On the opposite end of Ida, close to the 0° E meridian, is Vienna Regio. Vienna Regio is characterized by a large concave depression, which likely represents a degraded impact crater despite lacking an intact crater rim. In 1996, a team of astronomers led by Erik Asphaug proposed that the impact that created the Vienna Regio depression is likely responsible for the grooves of Pola Regio, as seismic waves from the impact event would concentrate within Pola Regio. Seismic waves from the impact that created the roughly 10 km (6.2 mi) large Azzura also focus on Pola Regio, though to a much weaker degree. However, energy from the Azzura impact may have helped reopen fractures created by the Vienna Regio impact. Alternatively, Ida may be a fragment of a larger asteroid that created the Koronis family, the fractures instead resulting from the breakup of the Koronis parent asteroid. Regardless, if the grooves are from the result of an impact, then Ida cannot be a rubble pile asteroid as the rubble would have absorbed the seismic energy. However, this runs contrary to other astronomers' interpretations that Ida is a rubble pile asteroid.

== See also ==
- List of geological features on Ida and Dactyl
