= Digel Cloud 2S =

Star-forming region in constellation Perseus

Nebula
- Star-forming region
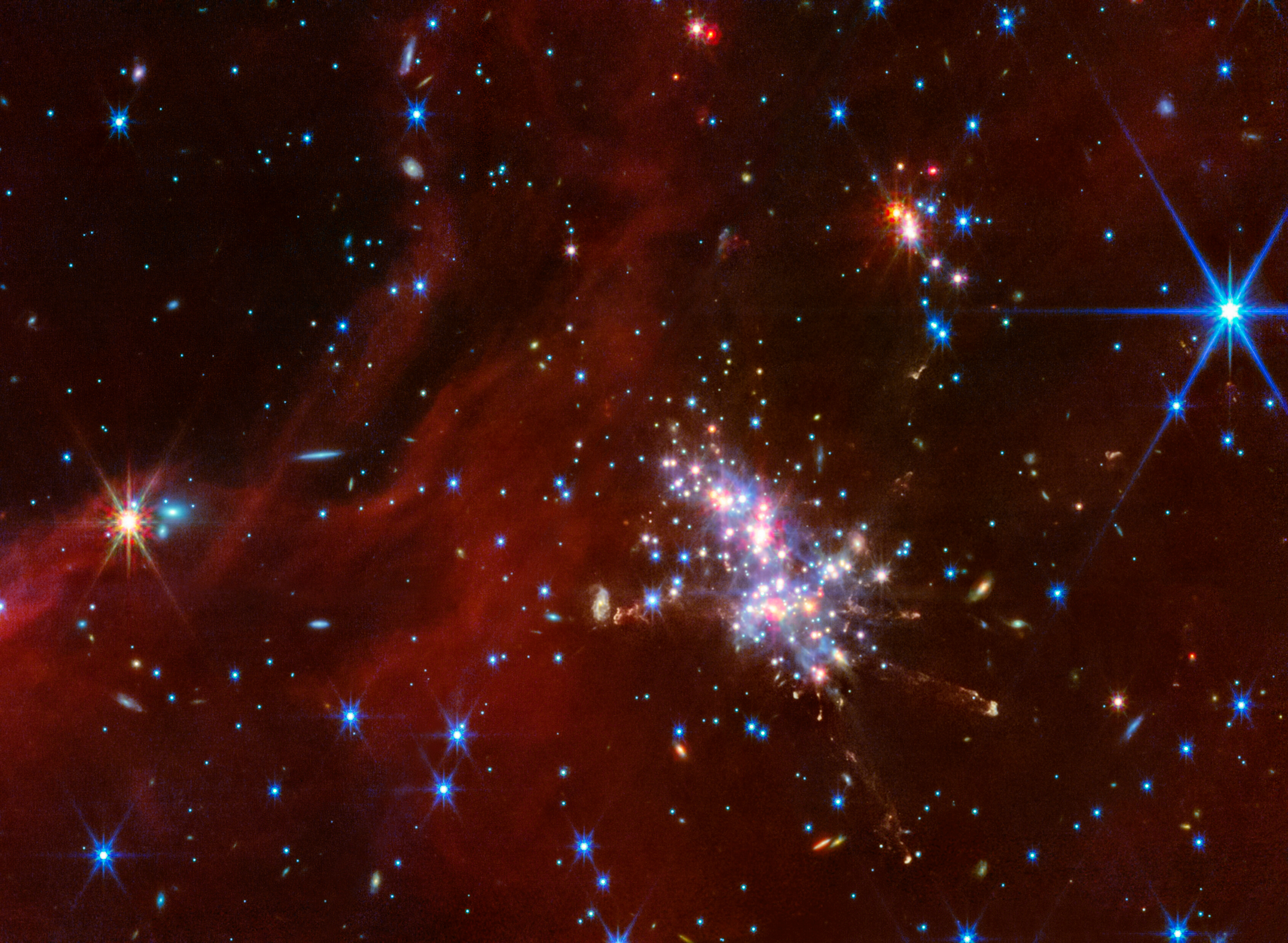
- Digel Cloud 2S imaged by James Webb Space Telescope

Observation data: J2000.0 epoch
- Right ascension: 02^{h} 48^{m} 28.45^{s}
- Declination: +58° 23′ 29.72″
- Distance: 40,000 ly
- Constellation: Perseus
- Designations: Digel Cloud 2S, [YKT2006b] Cloud2-S

Digel Cloud 2S is a star-forming region within the molecular cloud complex known as Digel Cloud 2, located in the Extreme Outer Galaxy region of the Milky Way. This region lies more than 58,000 light-years from the Galactic Center, placing it in one of the most distant and metal-poor parts of our galaxy.

== Observation ==
The Digel Clouds (1A, 1B, 2N & 2S) were first identified in molecular surveys in the 1990s, with subsequent studies confirming star formation activity in the Extreme Outer Galaxy. Detailed infrared imaging of Digel Cloud 2S came from NASA's James Webb Space Telescope (JWST) in 2024 by a team led by astronomers including Natsuko Izumi used JWST's Near-Infrared Camera (NIRCam) and Mid-Infrared Instrument (MIRI) to capture near and midinfrared light, revealing unprecedented detail invisible to optical telescopes.

== Characteristics ==
Digel Cloud 2S has 66 cluster members with a sub-cluster located northeast of the main cluster, this sub-cluster was identified to have 10 YSOs. The members of Digel Cloud 2S peak at a magnitude of 6.1 mag, while the field stars peak at a magnitude of 2.2 mag. The average (H – K)⁰ of Digel Cloud 2S is 0.49 mag, while the field stars is 0.12 mag. The spatial distribution of the stars indicates a mass of 46 M☉ and an estimated age of 1 Myr. The core of Digel Cloud 2S appears to be single, which resulted in an Mgas value of 310 M☉ with radius of 1.7 pc in FWHM. The Mstars value radius is ~0.6 pc, this is because of a 5% increase of 0.017 M☉.
