= SDSS J1254+0846 =

Binary quasar pair in the process of merging

Observation data (Epoch )
- Right ascension: 12^{h} 54^{m} 55.1^{s}
- Declination: +08° 46′ 54″
- Redshift: 0.44
- Type: SRBQ (Note: Spatially Resolved Binary Quasar)

SDSS J1254+0846 is a face-on binary quasar pair which is in the process of merging. This binary quasar is the first resolved luminous pair to be observed in the act of merging. The pair is composed of two luminous radio-quiet quasars located at redshift z=0.44, being SDSS J125455.09+084653.9 (SDSS J1254+0846 A) and SDSS J125454.87+084652.1 (SDSS J1254+0846 B), or SDSS J1254+0846 collectively. These designations also refer to their host galaxies. This pair provide evidence for the theory that quasars are switched on by galactic collisions. The pair are optically separated by 3.6 arcseconds, giving the real separation as 21 kpc. Tidal tails some 75 kpc have been detected around the galaxies. Thus the two galaxies involved are disc galaxies. The pair was first detected by the Sloan Digital Sky Survey, hence the "SDSS" designations. The tidal tails were first observed by the Magellan Telescopes. A computer simulation by Thomas Cox of the Carnegie Institute corroborated the hypothesis that these were two merging galaxies. This binary quasar, was at the time of discovery in 2010, the lowest redshift binary quasar then observed.

Prior to this discovery, all quasars in merging binary pairs either involved one luminous quasar, and a second obscured or dark nucleus, or a spatially unresolved pair of active nuclei.

== See also ==
- List of quasars
- SDSS J0100+2802
