= Nanophase ceramic =

Nanophase ceramics are ceramics that are nanophase materials (that is, materials that have grain sizes under 100 nanometers). They have the potential for superplastic deformation. Because of the small grain size and added grain boundaries properties such as ductility, hardness, and reactivity see drastic changes from ceramics with larger grains.

== Structure ==
The structure of nanophase ceramics is not too different than that of ceramics. The main difference is the amount of surface area per mass. Particles of ceramics have small surface areas, but when those particles are shrunk to within a few nanometers, the surface area of the same amount of a mass of a ceramic greatly increases. So in general, nanophase materials have greater surface areas than that of a similar mass material at a larger scale. This is important because if the surface area is very large the particles can be in contact with more of their surroundings, which in turn increases the reactivity of the material. The reactivity of a material changes the material's mechanical properties and chemical properties, among many other things. This is especially true in nanophase ceramics.

== Properties ==
Nanophase ceramics have unique properties than regular ceramics due to their improved reactivity. Nanophase ceramics exhibit different mechanical properties than their counterpart such as higher hardness, higher fracture toughness, and high ductility. These properties are far from ceramics which behave as brittle, low ductile materials.

Titanium dioxide

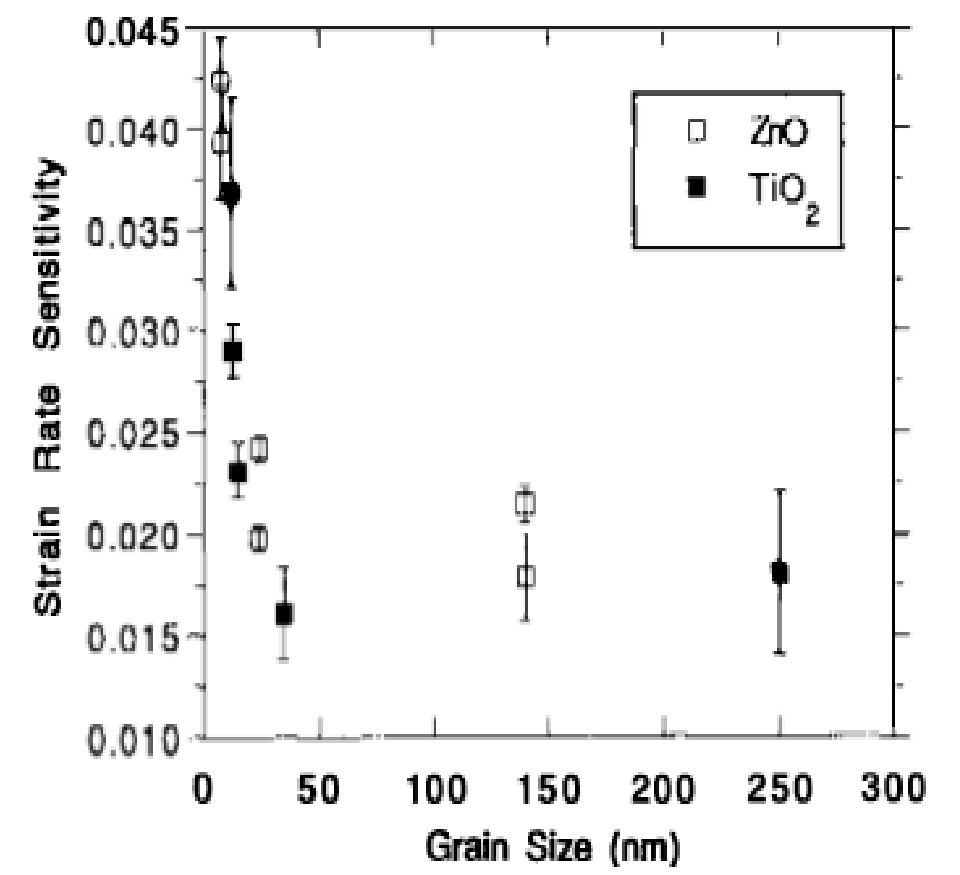
Strain rate sensitivity for TiO_{2}.

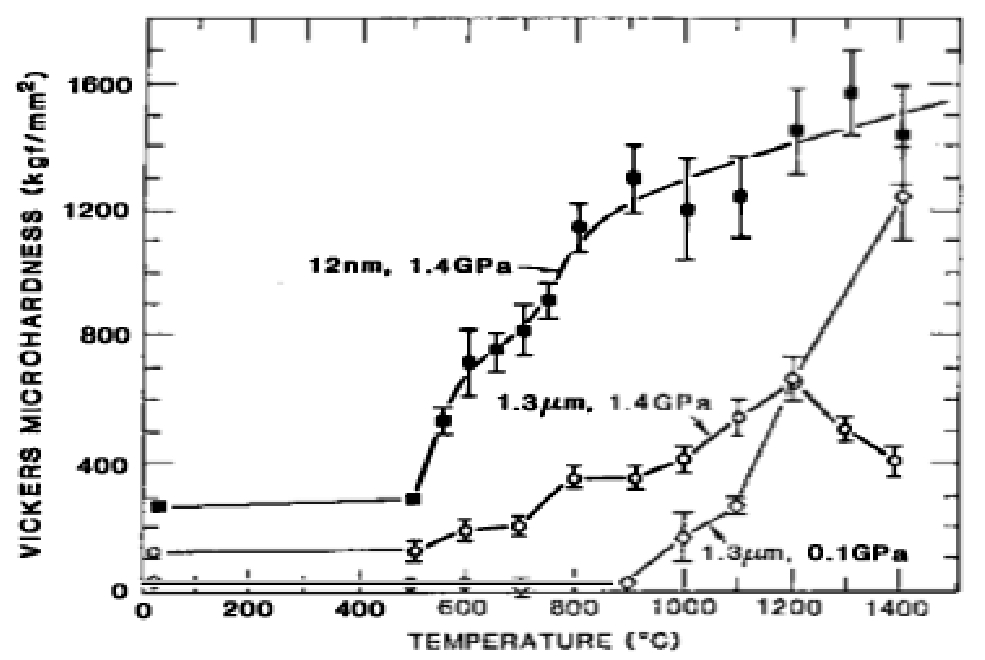
Microhardness of TiO_{2}.

Titanium dioxide (TiO_{2}), has been shown to have increased hardness and ductility at the nanoscale. In an experiment, grains of titanium dioxide that had an average size of 12 nanometers were compressed at 1.4 GPa and sintered at 200 °C. The result was a grain hardness of about 2.2 times greater than that of grains of titanium dioxide with an average size of 1.3 micrometers at the same temperature and pressure. In the same experiment, the ductility of titanium dioxide was measured. The strain rate sensitivity of a 250 nanometer grain of titanium dioxide was about 0.0175, while a grain with size of about 20 nanometers had a strain rate sensitivity of approximately .037; a significant increase.

== Processing ==
Nanophase ceramics can be processed from atomic, molecular, or bulk precursors. Gas condensation, chemical precipitation, aerosol reactions, biological templating, chemical vapor deposition, and physical vapor deposition are techniques used to synthesis nanophase ceramics from molecular or atomic precursors. To process nanophase ceramics from bulk precursors, mechanical attrition, crystallization from the amorphous state, and phase separation are used to create nanophase ceramics. Synthesizing nanophase ceramics from atomic or molecular precursors are desired more because a greater control over microscopic aspects of the nanophase ceramic can occur.

Gas condensation

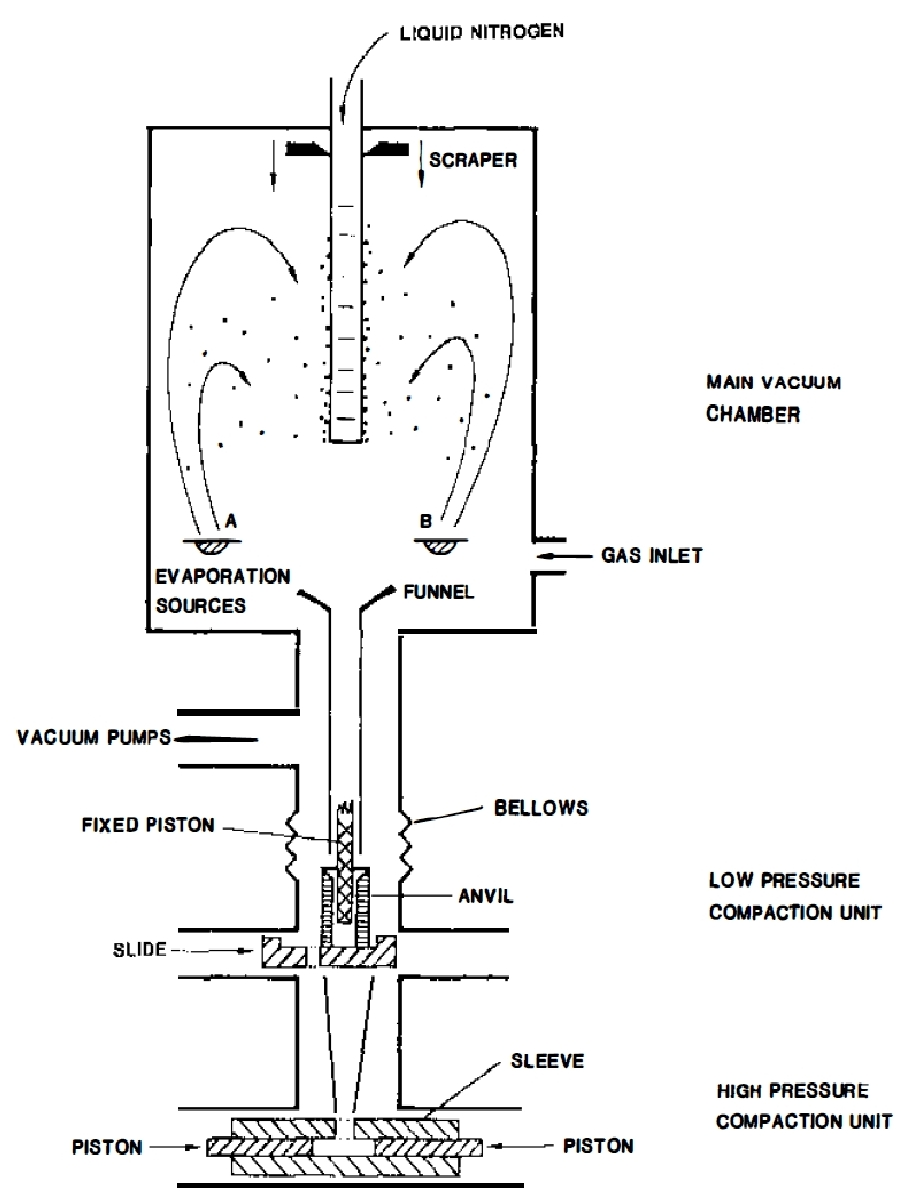
Synthesis of nanophase ceramics using gas condensation.

Gas condensation is one way nanophase ceramics are produced. First, precursor ceramics are evaporated from sources within a gas-condensation chamber. Then the ceramics are condensed in a gas (dependent on the material being synthesized) and transported via convection to a liquid-nitrogen filled cold finger. Next, the ceramic powders are scraped off the cold finger and collect in a funnel below the cold finger. The ceramic powders then become consolidated in a low-pressure compaction device and then in a high-pressure compaction device. This all occurs in a vacuum, so no impurities can enter the chamber and affect the results of the nanophase ceramics.

== Applications ==
Nanophase ceramics have unique properties that make them optimal for a variety of applications.

Drug delivery

Materials used in drug delivery in the past ten years have primarily been polymers. However, nanotechnology has opened the door for the use of ceramics with benefits not previously seen in polymers. The large surface area to volume ratio of nanophase materials makes it possible for large amounts of drugs to be released over long periods of time. Nanoparticles to be filled with drugs can be easily manipulated in size and composition to allow for increased endocytosis of drugs into targeted cells and increased dispersion through fenestrations in capillaries. While these benefits all relate to nanoparticles in general (including polymers), ceramics have other, unique abilities. Unlike polymers, slow degradation of ceramics allows for longer release of the drug. Polymers also tend to swell in liquid which can cause an unwanted burst of drugs. The lack of swelling shown by most ceramics allows for increased control. Ceramics can also be created to match the chemistry of biological cells in the body increasing bioactivity and biocompatibility. Nanophase ceramic drug carriers are also able to target specific cells. This can be done by manufacturing a material to bond to the specific cell or by applying an external magnetic field, attracting the carrier to a specific location.

Bone substitution

Nanophase ceramics have great potential for use in orthopedic medicine. Bone and collagen have structures on the nanoscale. Nanomaterials can be manufactured to simulate these structures which is necessary for grafts and implants to successfully adapt to and handle varying stresses. The surface properties of nanophase ceramics is also very important for bone substitution and regeneration. Nanophase ceramics have much rougher surfaces than larger materials and also have increased surface area. This promotes reactivity and absorption of proteins that assist tissue development. Nano-hydroxyapatite is one nanophase ceramic that is used as a bone substitute. Nano grain size increases the bonding, growth, and differentiation of osteoblasts onto the ceramic. The surfaces of nanophase ceramics can also be modified to be porous allowing osteoblasts to create bone within the structure. The degradation of the ceramic is also important because the rate can be changed by changing the crystallinity. This way as bone grows the substitute can diminish at a similar rate.
