= C/1989 Y1 (Skorichenko–George) =

Non-periodic comet

Discovery
- Discovered by: Boris Skoritchenko; Douglas B. George
- Discovery date: 17 December 1989

Designations
- Alternative designations: 1990 VI; 1989e_{1}

Orbital characteristics
- Epoch: 24 February 1990 (JD 2447946.5)
- Observation arc: 1,008 days (2.76 years)
- Number of observations: 106
- Aphelion: 1,188.42 AU
- Perihelion: 1.569 AU
- Semi-major axis: 594.994 AU
- Eccentricity: 0.997363
- Orbital period: 14,514 years
- Inclination: 59.3660
- Longitude of ascending node: 279.998°
- Argument of periapsis: 137.862°
- Last perihelion: 11 April 1990
- Earth MOID: 0.7346 AU
- Jupiter MOID: 1.8047 AU

Physical characteristics
- Comet total magnitude (M1): 5.3
- Comet nuclear magnitude (M2): 11.9
- Apparent magnitude: 9–10 (1990 apparition)

Comet Skorichenko–George (sometimes spelled Scorichenko–George), formally designated as C/1989 Y1, 1990 VI, and 1989e_{1}, is a non-periodic comet co-discovered by astronomers Boris Skorichenko and Doug George on December 17, 1989. It has a hyperbolic trajectory around the Sun, but still weakly bound to it by its barycenter.

== Discovery and observations ==
It was discovered on December 17, 1989 by Doug George of Kanata (near Ottawa), Ontario, Canada, and Soviet astronomer Boris Skoritchenko (Mezmay, Krasnodar Krai). Skoritchenko was using 8×20 binoculars, whilst George was using a 16" reflector and had searched for 65 hours. The comet was magnitude 10.5 in the northern evening sky. It passed its perihelion on April 11, 1990 at a distance of 1.57 AU (235 million km), and remained visible as a magnitude 9–10 object in the night sky until April 1990

C_{2} emission bands were observed in the comet Skorichenko-George. Unlike most comets, Skorichenko–George did not produce a tail. Its coma remained consistently diffuse, estimated to be around 190,000–290,000 km (120,000–180,000 mi) in diameter.
