= SDSS J0100+2802 =

Hyperluminous quasar in the constellation Pisces

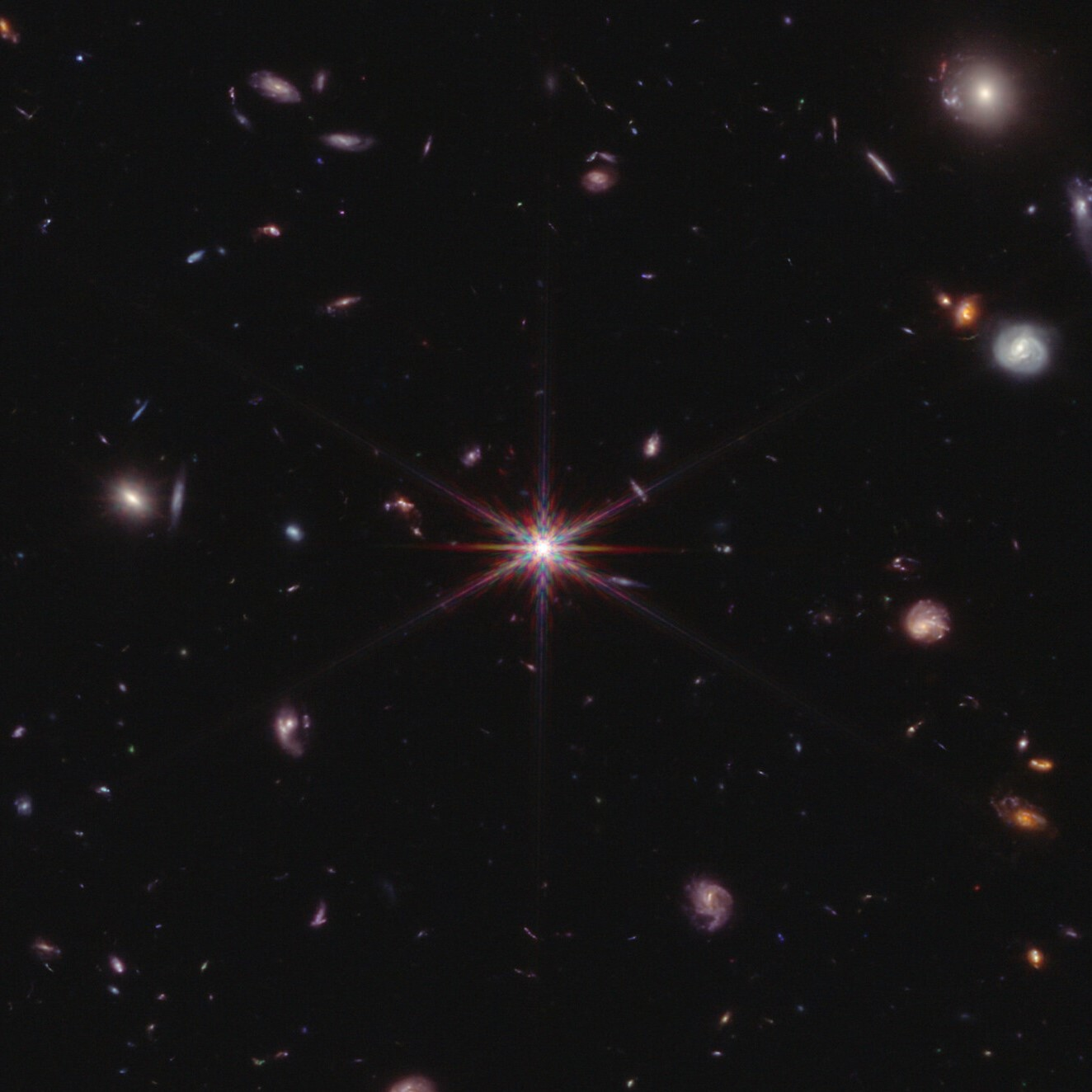
- NIRCam image of SDSS J0100+2802 and other distant galaxies. SDSS J0100+2802 is visible in the center as a pale pink light-source with six prominent diffraction spikes.

Observation data (Epoch J2000.0)
- Constellation: Pisces
- Right ascension: 01^{h} 00^{m} 13.02^{s}
- Declination: +28° 02′ 25.8″
- Redshift: 6.30
- Distance: 12.8×10^{9} light-years (3.9×10^{9} parsecs)

Other designations
- SDSS J010013.02+280225.8

SDSS J0100+2802 (SDSS J010013.02+280225.8) is a hyperluminous quasar located near the border of the constellations Pisces and Andromeda. It has a redshift of 6.30, which corresponds to a distance of 12.8 billion light-years from Earth and was formed 900 million years after the Big Bang.

== Description ==
It appears to recede at a velocity of 1.3782×10^{8} m/s. It unleashes an immense amount of power equivalent to 3×10^{41} watts, which corresponds to the absolute bolometric magnitude of −31.7 which is 4.3×10^{14} times the luminosity of the Sun, and 40,000 times as luminous as all of the 400 billion stars of the Milky Way galaxy combined. SDSS J0100+2802 is about four times more luminous than SDSS J1148+5251, and seven times more luminous than ULAS J1120+0641, the most distant quasar known. It harbors a black hole with mass of 12 billion solar masses (estimated (1.24±0.19)×10^{10}M_{☉} according to MgII emission line correlations). This makes it one of the most massive black holes discovered so early in the universe, although it is only less than one fifth as massive as Ton 618, the most massive black hole known. The diameter of this black hole is about 70.9 billion kilometres, seven times the diameter of Pluto's orbit.

== See also ==
- List of quasars
- SDSS J1254+0846
