= Dactyls (mythology) =

Greek mythological beings

In Greek mythology, the Dactyls or Daktyloi (/ˈdæktɪlz/; from Ancient Greek: Δάκτυλοι Dáktuloi "fingers") were the archaic mythical race of male beings associated with the Great Mother, whether as Cybele or Rhea. Their numbers vary, but often they were ten spirit-men so like the three Korybantes or the Cabeiri that they were often interchangeable. The Dactyls were both ancient smiths and healing magicians. In some myths, they are in Hephaestus' employ, and they taught metalworking, mathematics, and the alphabet to humans.

When Ankhiale knew her time of delivery was come, she went to the Idaean Cave on Mount Ida or, alternatively, Psychro Cave on the Lasithi Plateau. As she squatted in labor she dug her fingers into the earth (Gaia), which brought forth these daktyloi Idaioi (Δάκτυλοι Ἰδαῖοι "Idaean fingers"), thus often ten in number, or sometimes multiplied into a race of ten tens. Three is just as often given as their number. They are sometimes instead numbered as thirty-three.

When Greeks offered a most solemn oath, often they would press their hands against the earth as they uttered it.

== Idaean Dactyls ==
The Dactyls of Mount Ida in Crete invented the art of working metals into usable shapes with fire; Walter Burkert surmises that, as the societies of lesser gods mirrored actual cult associations, guilds of smiths corresponded to the daktyloi in real life. According to Hesiod, they also discovered iron in Crete. Three Phrygian Dactyls, in the service of the Great Mother as Adraste (Ἀδράστη), are usually named Acmon (the anvil), Damnameneus (the hammer), and Celmis (casting). Of Celmis, Ovid (in Metamorphoses iv) made a story that when Rhea was offended at this childhood companion of Zeus, she asked Zeus to turn him to diamond-hard adamant, like a tempered blade. Zeus obliged. Zenobius wrote that Celmis was turned into iron when he offended Rhea.

Later Greek attempts to justify and rationalize the relationships of Dactyls, Curetes, and Corybantes were never fully successful. Strabo says of the mythographers:

"And they suspect that both the Kouretes and the Korybantes were offspring of the Daktyloi Idaioi; at any rate, the first hundred men born in Crete were called Idaian Daktyloi, they say, and these were born of nine Kouretes, for each of these begot ten children who were called Idaian Daktyloi."

The Cabeiri (Ancient Greek: Κάβειροι), whose sacred place was on the island of Samothrace, were understood by Diodorus Siculus to have been Idaean dactyls who had come west from Phrygia and whose magical practices had made local converts to their secret cult.

An Idaean dactyl named Herakles (perhaps the earliest embodiment of the later hero) originated the Olympic Games by instigating a race among his four "finger" brothers. This Herakles was the "thumb"; his brothers were Paeonius (forefinger), Epimedes (middle finger), Iasius (ring finger/healing finger), and Idaius or Acesides (little finger).

== Rhodian Dactyls ==
On Rhodes, Telchines were the name given to similar chthonic men, nine in number, remembered by Greeks as dangerous Underworld smiths and magicians, and multiplied into an entire autochthonous race that had reared Poseidon but had been supplanted by Apollo in his Helios role.

== Cretan Dactyls ==
In Crete, three Dactyls bore names suggestive of healing: Paionios (later associated with Asclepius), Epimedes, and Iasios. It was said that they had introduced the smithing of copper and iron. Of Iasion it was told (Hesiod, Theogony 970) that he lay with Demeter, a stand-in for Rhea, in a thrice-ploughed field and the Goddess brought forth Ploutos, "wealth", in the form of a bountiful harvest. Zeus struck down this impious archaic figure with a thunderbolt. This is all of the public version of this myth that survives. Doubtless, initiates must have known more.

== See also ==
- Dactyl, an asteroid moon of 243 Ida, named after the Dactyls.
- Ephesia Grammata
- Goetia
- Magic in the Graeco-Roman world
