= V1331 Cygni =

Star in constellation Cygnus

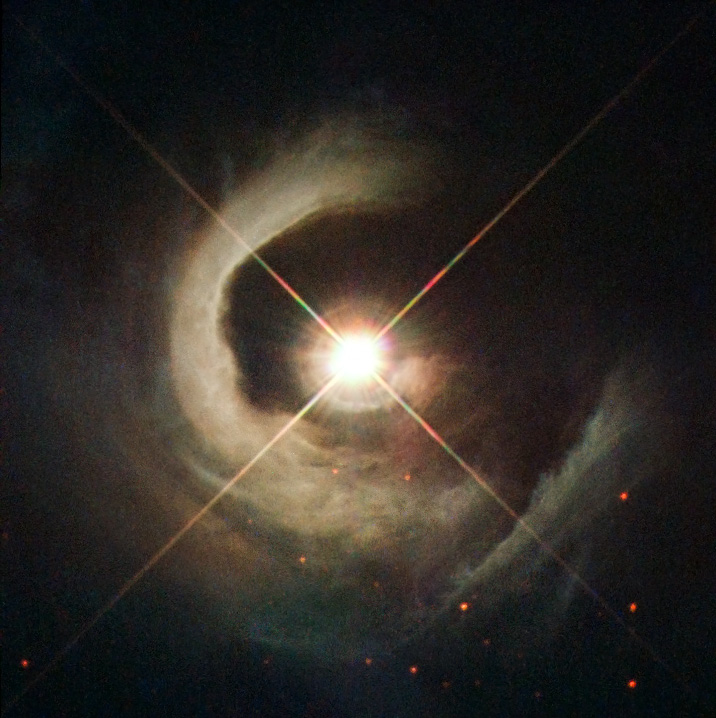
- V1331 Cygni as photographed by the Hubble Space Telescope

Observation data Epoch J2000 Equinox J2000
- Constellation: Cygnus
- Right ascension: 21^{h} 01^{m} 09.20684^{s}
- Declination: +50° 21′ 44.8033″
- Apparent magnitude (V): 11.99

Characteristics
- Evolutionary stage: pre-main sequence
- Spectral type: G7-K0IV

Astrometry
Proper motion (μ)	RA: 0.980 mas/yr Dec.: −3.783 mas/yr
Parallax (π)	1.6760±0.0237 mas
Distance	1,950 ± 30 ly (597 ± 8 pc)

Details
Mass	2.8 M_{☉}
Radius	5 R_{☉}
Luminosity	21 L_{☉}
Temperature	5200 K

Other designations
- V1331 Cyg, GSC 03596-00959, 2MASS J21010920+5021445

Database references
SIMBAD	data

V1331 Cygni (also known as V1331 Cyg) is a young star in the located 1,950 light years from Earth on the constellation of Cygnus. V1331 Cyg is located in the dark nebula LDN 981.

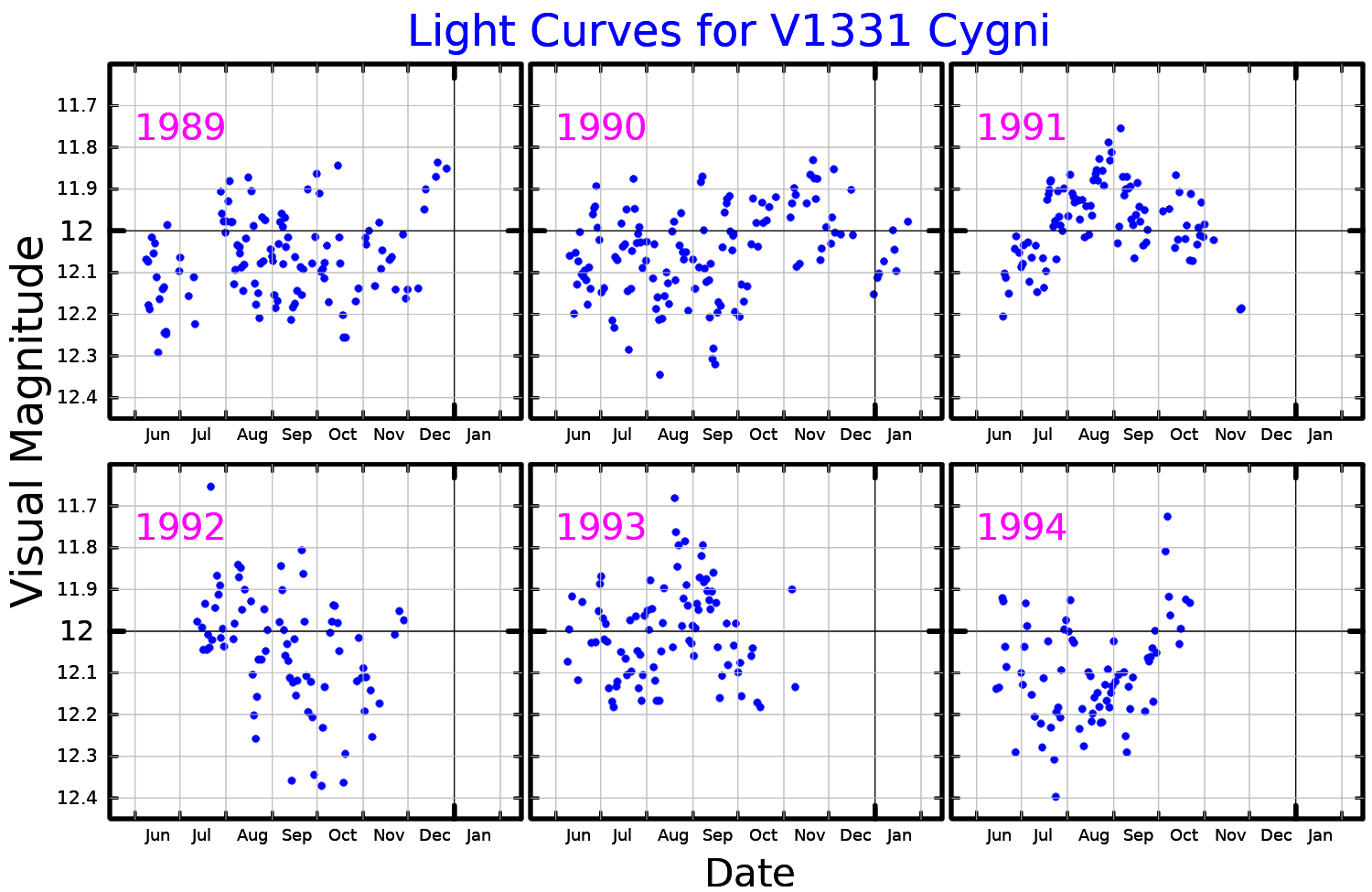
Six visual band light curves for V1331 Cygni, adapted from Mel'nikov (1997)

V1331 Cygni is most noted for having an arc-like reflection nebula surrounding it. This circumstellar disc is a great birthplace for young stars, which form in the cloud. V1331 Cygni is heavily obscured by dust, so the properties of the central star are hard to deduce; however, it is estimated to have a radius five times that of the Sun and a mass of 2.8 M_{☉}.

The General Catalog of Variable Stars classifies V1331 Cygni as an "INST" type variable, meaning a T Tauri star which shows rapid light variations. Its visual band brightness varies from magnitude 13.08 to 10.58. It is sometimes classified as a pre-FUOR star. A semi-regular period of ~449 days has been reported. Unlike many T Tauri stars, the mean brightness of V1331 Cygni remains nearly constant over long time periods.

== Gallery ==
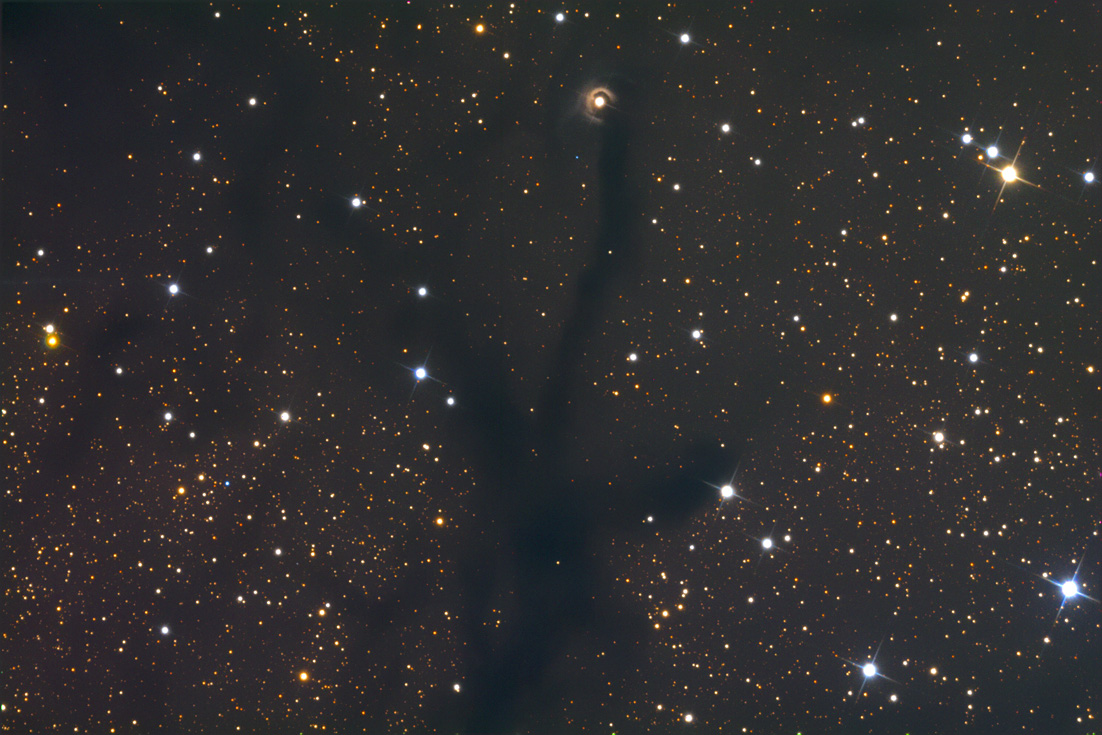
Dark nebula LDN 981 and V1331 Cygni (top center) by the Mount Lemmon SkyCenter
