= Acmon (Dactyl) =

In Greek mythology, one of the Dactyls

Acmon (Ancient Greek: Ἄκμων means 'anvil, pestle') in Greek mythology, was one of the Dactyls, associated with the anvil, or perhaps the Corybantes. He was the son of Socus and Combe. Together with his brothers, Acmon followed Dionysus in his Indian campaign.
