= Nanophase material =

Nanophase materials are materials that have grain sizes under 100 nanometres. They have different mechanical and optical properties compared to the large grained materials of the same chemical composition.

Transparency and different transparent colours can be achieved with nanophase materials by varying the grain size.

== Nanophase materials ==
- Nanophase metals usually are many times harder but more brittle than regular metals.
  - nanophase copper is a superhard material
  - nanophase aluminum
  - nanophase iron is iron with a grain size in the nanometer range. Nanocrystalline iron has a tensile strength of around 6 GPA, twice that of the best maraging steels.
- Nanophase ceramics usually are more ductile and less brittle than regular ceramics.
