= Dactyl (moon) =

Moon of asteroid 243 Ida

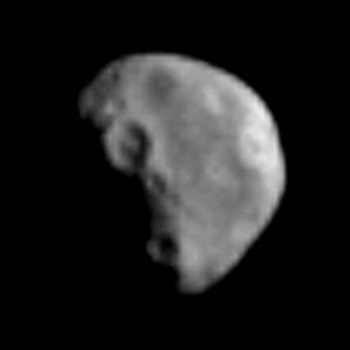
- Highest-resolution image of Dactyl, recorded while Galileo was about 3,900 km away from the moon

Discovery
- Discovered by: Ann Harch
- Discovery site: Galileo spacecraft
- Discovery date: 17 February 1994

Designations
- Pronunciation: /ˈdæktɪl/ DAK-til
- Named after: Dactyls
- Alternative designations: 1993 (243) 1
- Adjectives: Dactylian /dækˈtɪliən/

Orbital characteristics
- Semi-major axis: 90 km at time of discovery
- Orbital period (sidereal): prograde, ca. 20 h
- Inclination: ca. 8°
- Satellite of: Ida

Physical characteristics
- Dimensions: 1.6 km × 1.4 km × 1.2 km
- Equatorial escape velocity: 0.895 m/s
- Synodic rotation period: synchronous
- Temperature: 200 K (−73 °C; −100 °F)

Dactyl (/ˈdæktɪl/ DAK-til), formal designation (243) Ida I, is a small asteroid moon 1,200 by 1,400 by 1,600 m (3,900 by 4,600 by 5,200 ft), in size) that orbits 243 Ida, a main-belt asteroid. It was imaged by the Galileo spacecraft on August 28, 1993; Dactyl was discovered while examining the delayed image downloads from Galileo on February 17, 1994. It was provisionally designated S/1993 (243) 1. The satellite was named after the mythical creatures called dactyls, who, according to Greek mythology, lived on Mount Ida.

== Discovery ==
Dactyl was found on 17 February 1994 by Galileo mission member Ann Harch, while examining delayed image downloads from the spacecraft. Galileo recorded 47 images of Dactyl over an observation period of 5.5 hours in August 1993. The spacecraft was 10,760 kilometres (6,690 mi) from Ida and 10,870 kilometres (6,750 mi) from Dactyl when the first image of the moon was captured, 14 minutes before Galileo made its closest approach.

Dactyl was initially designated 1993 (243) 1. It was named by the International Astronomical Union in 1994, for the mythological Dactyls who inhabited Mount Ida on the island of Crete.

== Physical characteristics ==
Dactyl is an "egg-shaped" but "remarkably spherical" object measuring 1.6 by 1.4 by 1.2 kilometres (0.99 by 0.87 by 0.75 mi). It is oriented with its longest axis pointing towards Ida. Like Ida, Dactyl's surface exhibits saturation cratering. It is marked by more than a dozen craters with a diameter greater than 80 m (260 ft), indicating that the moon has suffered many collisions during its history. At least six craters form a linear chain, suggesting that it was caused by locally produced debris, possibly ejected from Ida. Dactyl's craters may contain central peaks, unlike those found on Ida. These features, and Dactyl's spheroidal shape, imply that the moon is gravitationally controlled despite its small size. Like Ida, its average temperature is about 200 K (−73 °C; −100 °F).

Dactyl shares many characteristics with Ida. Their albedos and reflection spectra are very similar. The small differences indicate that the space weathering process is less active on Dactyl. Its small size would make the formation of significant amounts of regolith impossible. This contrasts with Ida, which is covered by a deep layer of regolith.

The two largest imaged craters on Dactyl were named Acmon /ˈækmən/ and Celmis /ˈsɛlmɪs/, after two of the mythological Dactyls. Acmon is the largest crater in the above image, and Celmis is near the bottom of the image, mostly obscured in shadow. The craters are 300 and 200 meters in diameter, respectively.

== Orbit ==
Diagram of potential orbits of Dactyl around Ida

Dactyl's orbit around Ida is not precisely known. Galileo was in the plane of Dactyl's orbit when most of the images were taken, which made determining its exact orbit difficult. Dactyl orbits in the prograde direction and is inclined about 8° to Ida's equator. Based on computer simulations, Dactyl's pericenter must be more than about 65 km (40 mi) from Ida for it to remain in a stable orbit. The range of orbits generated by the simulations was narrowed down by the necessity of having the orbits pass through points at which Galileo observed Dactyl to be at 16:52:05 UT on 28 August 1993, about 90 km (56 mi) from Ida at longitude 85°. On 26 April 1994, the Hubble Space Telescope observed Ida for eight hours and was unable to spot Dactyl. It would have been able to observe it if it were more than about 700 km (430 mi) from Ida.

If in a circular orbit at the distance at which it was seen, Dactyl's orbital period would be about 20 hours. Its orbital speed is roughly 10 m/s (33 ft/s), "about the speed of a fast run or a slowly thrown baseball".

== Age and origin ==
Dactyl may have originated at the same time as Ida, from the disruption of the Koronis parent body. However, it may have formed more recently, perhaps as ejecta from a large impact on Ida. It is extremely unlikely that it was captured by Ida. Dactyl may have suffered a major impact around 100 million years ago, which reduced its size.

Dactyl was the first asteroid moon discovered. Its discovery settled the long debate over the existence of asteroid moons.

== See also ==
- List of geological features on 243 Ida and Dactyl
