= Theta Sagittarii =

The Bayer designation Theta Sagittarii (θ Sagittarii) is shared by two stars, θ^{1} Sagittarii and θ^{2} Sagittarii, in the constellation Sagittarius. The pair are separated by 0.58° in the sky.

- θ^{1} Sagittarii
- θ^{2} Sagittarii
