= 243 Ida =

Main-belt asteroid

Ida
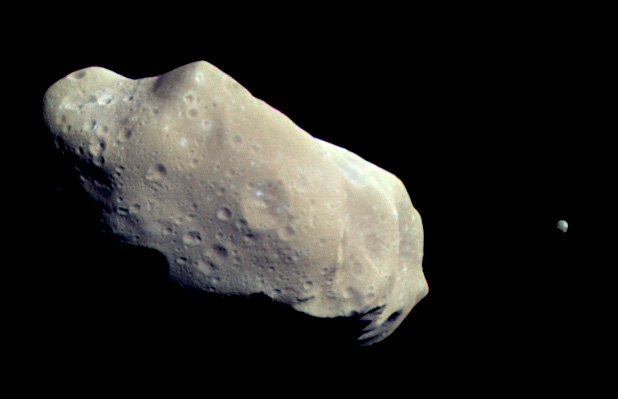
- Enhanced color Galileo image of 243 Ida. Pola Regio is located on the right "tip" of the asteroid. The dot to the right is its moon Dactyl.

Discovery
- Discovered by: Johann Palisa
- Discovery site: Vienna Observatory
- Discovery date: September 29, 1884

Designations
- Pronunciation: /ˈaɪdə/
- Named after: Ida (nurse of Zeus)
- Minor planet category: Main belt (Koronis family)
- Adjectives: Idean (Idæan) /aɪˈdiːən/

Orbital characteristics
- Epoch 31 July 2016 (JD 2457600.5)
- Aphelion: 2.979 AU (4.457×10^{11} m)
- Perihelion: 2.743 AU (4.103×10^{11} m)
- Semi-major axis: 2.861 AU (4.280×10^{11} m)
- Eccentricity: 0.0411
- Orbital period (sidereal): 1,767.644 days (4.83955 a)
- Average orbital speed: 0.2036°/d
- Mean anomaly: 38.707°
- Inclination: 1.132°
- Longitude of ascending node: 324.016°
- Argument of perihelion: 110.961°
- Known satellites: 1 (Dactyl)

Physical characteristics
- Dimensions: 59.8 × 25.4 × 18.6 km
- Mean radius: 15.7±0.6 km
- Surface area: 3900±300 km^{2}
- Volume: 16100±1900 km^{3}
- Mass: (3.65–4.99)×10^{16} kg
- Mean density: 2.27–3.10 g/cm^{3}
- Equatorial surface gravity: 0.31–1.1 cm/s^{2}
- Synodic rotation period: 4.633632±0.000007 h
- North pole right ascension: 168.76°
- North pole declination: −87.12°
- Geometric albedo: 0.2383
- Temperature: 200 K (−73 °C)
- Spectral type: S
- Absolute magnitude (H): 9.94

243 Ida is an asteroid in the Koronis family of the asteroid belt. It was discovered on 29 September 1884 by Austrian astronomer Johann Palisa at Vienna Observatory and named after a nymph from Greek mythology. Later telescopic observations categorized Ida as an S-type asteroid, the most numerous type in the inner asteroid belt. On 28 August 1993, Ida was visited by the uncrewed Galileo spacecraft while en route to Jupiter. It was the second asteroid visited by a spacecraft and the first found to have a natural satellite.

Ida's orbit lies between the planets Mars and Jupiter, like all main-belt asteroids. Its orbital period is 4.84 years, and its rotation period is 4.63 hours. Ida has an average diameter of 31.4 km (19.5 mi). It is irregularly shaped and elongated, apparently composed of two large objects connected together. Its surface is one of the most heavily cratered in the Solar System, featuring a wide variety of crater sizes and ages.

Ida's moon Dactyl was discovered by mission member Ann Harch in images returned from Galileo. It was named after the Dactyls, figures who inhabited Mount Ida in Greek mythology. Dactyl is only 1.4 kilometres (0.87 mi) in diameter, about 1/20 the size of Ida. Its orbit around Ida could not be determined with much accuracy, but the constraints of possible orbits allowed a rough determination of Ida's density and revealed that it is depleted of metallic minerals. Dactyl and Ida share many characteristics, suggesting a common origin.

The images returned from Galileo and the subsequent measurement of Ida's mass provided new insights into the geology of S-type asteroids. Before the Galileo flyby, many different theories had been proposed to explain their mineral composition. Determining their composition permits a correlation between meteorites falling to the Earth and their origin in the asteroid belt. Data returned from the flyby pointed to S-type asteroids as the source for the ordinary chondrite meteorites, the most common type found on the Earth's surface.

== Discovery and observations ==
Ida was discovered on 29 September 1884 by Austrian astronomer Johann Palisa at the Vienna Observatory. It was his 45th asteroid discovery. Ida was named by Moriz von Kuffner, a Viennese brewer and amateur astronomer. In Greek mythology, Ida was a nymph of Crete who raised the god Zeus. Ida was recognized as a member of the Koronis family by Kiyotsugu Hirayama, who proposed in 1918 that the group comprised the remnants of a destroyed precursor body.

Ida's reflection spectrum was measured on 16 September 1980 by astronomers David J. Tholen and Edward F. Tedesco as part of the eight-color asteroid survey (ECAS). Its spectrum matched those of the asteroids in the S-type classification. Many observations of Ida were made in early 1993 by the US Naval Observatory in Flagstaff and the Oak Ridge Observatory. These improved the measurement of Ida's orbit around the Sun and reduced the uncertainty of its position during the Galileo flyby from 78 to 60 km (48 to 37 mi).

== Exploration ==
=== Galileo flyby ===
Ida was visited in 1993 by the Jupiter-bound space probe Galileo. Its encounters of the asteroids Gaspra and Ida were secondary to the Jupiter mission. These were selected as targets in response to a new NASA policy directing mission planners to consider asteroid flybys for all spacecraft crossing the belt. No prior missions had attempted such a flyby. Galileo was launched into orbit by the Space Shuttle Atlantis mission STS-34 on 18 October 1989. Changing Galileo's trajectory to approach Ida required that it consume 34 kg (75 lb) of propellant. Mission planners delayed the decision to attempt a flyby until they were certain that this would leave the spacecraft enough propellant to complete its Jupiter mission.

Galileo's trajectory carried it into the asteroid belt twice on its way to Jupiter. During its second crossing, it flew by Ida on 28 August 1993 at a speed of 12,400 m/s (41,000 ft/s) relative to the asteroid. The onboard imager observed Ida from a distance of 240,350 km (149,350 mi) to its closest approach of 2,390 km (1,490 mi). Ida was the second asteroid, after Gaspra, to be imaged by a spacecraft. About 95% of Ida's surface came into view of the probe during the flyby.

Transmission of many Ida images was delayed due to a permanent failure in the spacecraft's high-gain antenna. The first five images were received in September 1993. These comprised a high-resolution mosaic of the asteroid at a resolution of 31–38 m/pixel. The remaining images were sent in February 1994, when the spacecraft's proximity to the Earth allowed higher speed transmissions.

Animation of Galileo's trajectory from 19 October 1989 to 30 September 2003
Galileo · Jupiter · Earth · Venus · 951 Gaspra · 243 Ida

Trajectory of Galileo from launch to Jupiter orbital insertion

Images from the flyby, starting 5.4 hours before closest approach and showing Ida's rotation

=== Discoveries ===
The data returned from the Galileo flybys of Gaspra and Ida, and the later NEAR Shoemaker asteroid mission, permitted the first study of asteroid geology. Ida's relatively large surface exhibited a diverse range of geological features. The discovery of Ida's moon Dactyl, the first confirmed satellite of an asteroid, provided additional insights into Ida's composition.

Ida is classified as an S-type asteroid based on ground-based spectroscopic measurements. The composition of S-types was uncertain before the Galileo flybys, but was interpreted to be either of two minerals found in meteorites that had fallen to the Earth: ordinary chondrite (OC) and stony-iron. Estimates of Ida's density are constrained to less than 3.2 g/cm^{3} by the long-term stability of Dactyl's orbit. This all but rules out a stony-iron composition; were Ida made of 5 g/cm^{3} iron- and nickel-rich material, it would have to contain more than 40% empty space.

The Galileo images also led to the discovery that space weathering was taking place on Ida, a process which causes older regions to become more red in color over time. The same process affects both Ida and its moon, although Dactyl shows a lesser change. The weathering of Ida's surface revealed another detail about its composition: the reflection spectra of freshly exposed parts of the surface resembled that of OC meteorites, but the older regions matched the spectra of S-type asteroids.

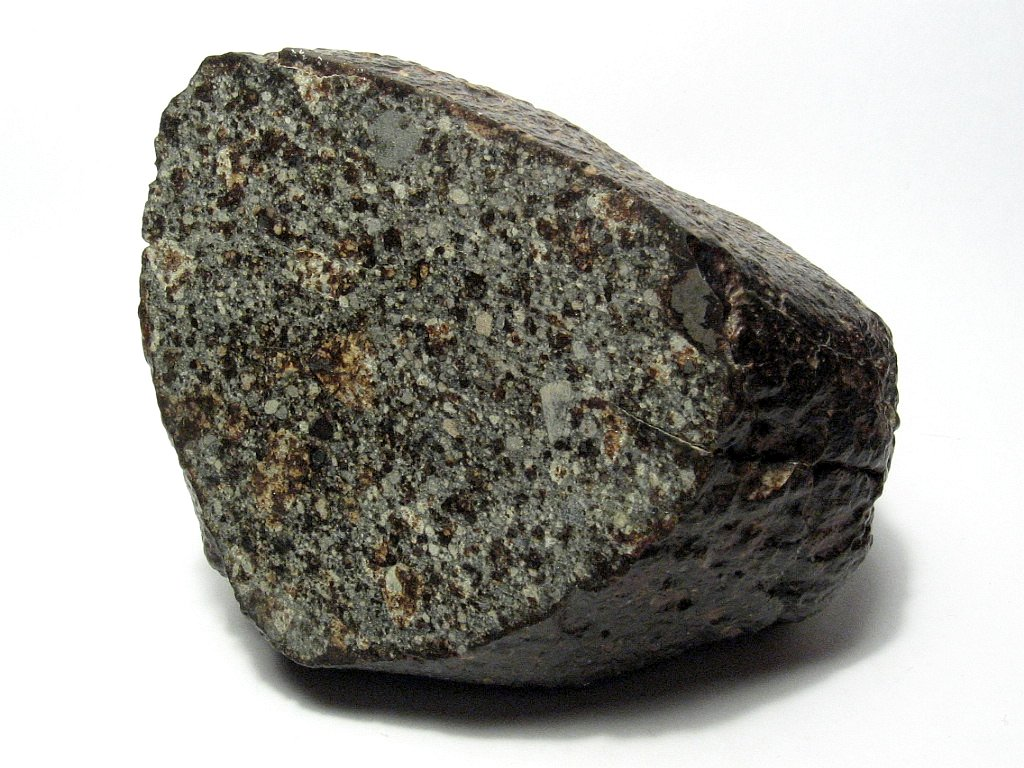
Polished section of an ordinary chondrite meteorite

Both of these discoveries—the space weathering effects and the low density—led to a new understanding about the relationship between S-type asteroids and OC meteorites. S-types are the most numerous kind of asteroid in the inner part of the asteroid belt. OC meteorites are, likewise, the most common type of meteorite found on the Earth's surface. The reflection spectra measured by remote observations of S-type asteroids, however, did not match that of OC meteorites. The Galileo flyby of Ida found that some S-types, particularly the Koronis family, could be the source of these meteorites.

== Physical characteristics ==
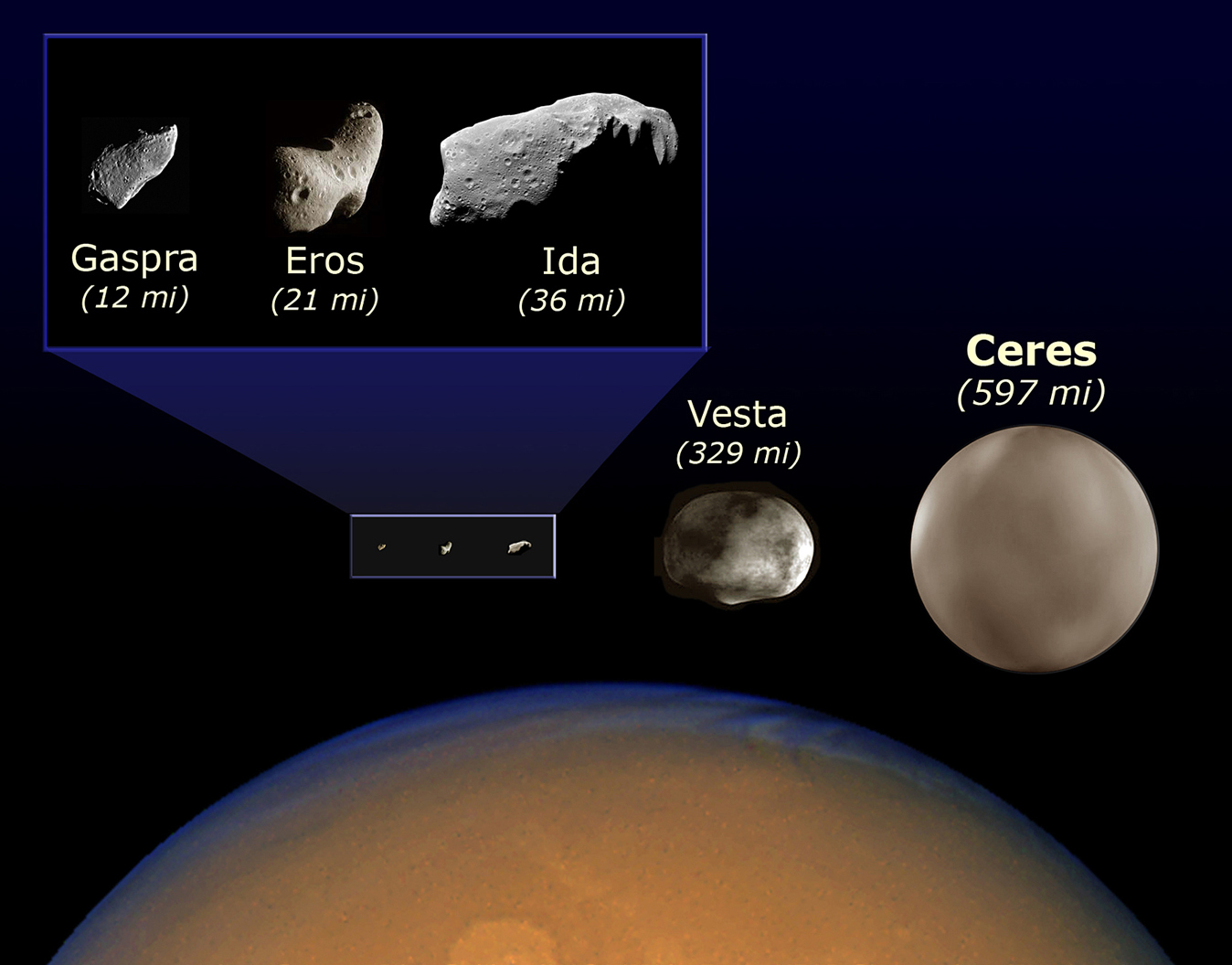
Size comparison of Ida, several other asteroids, the dwarf planet Ceres, and Mars

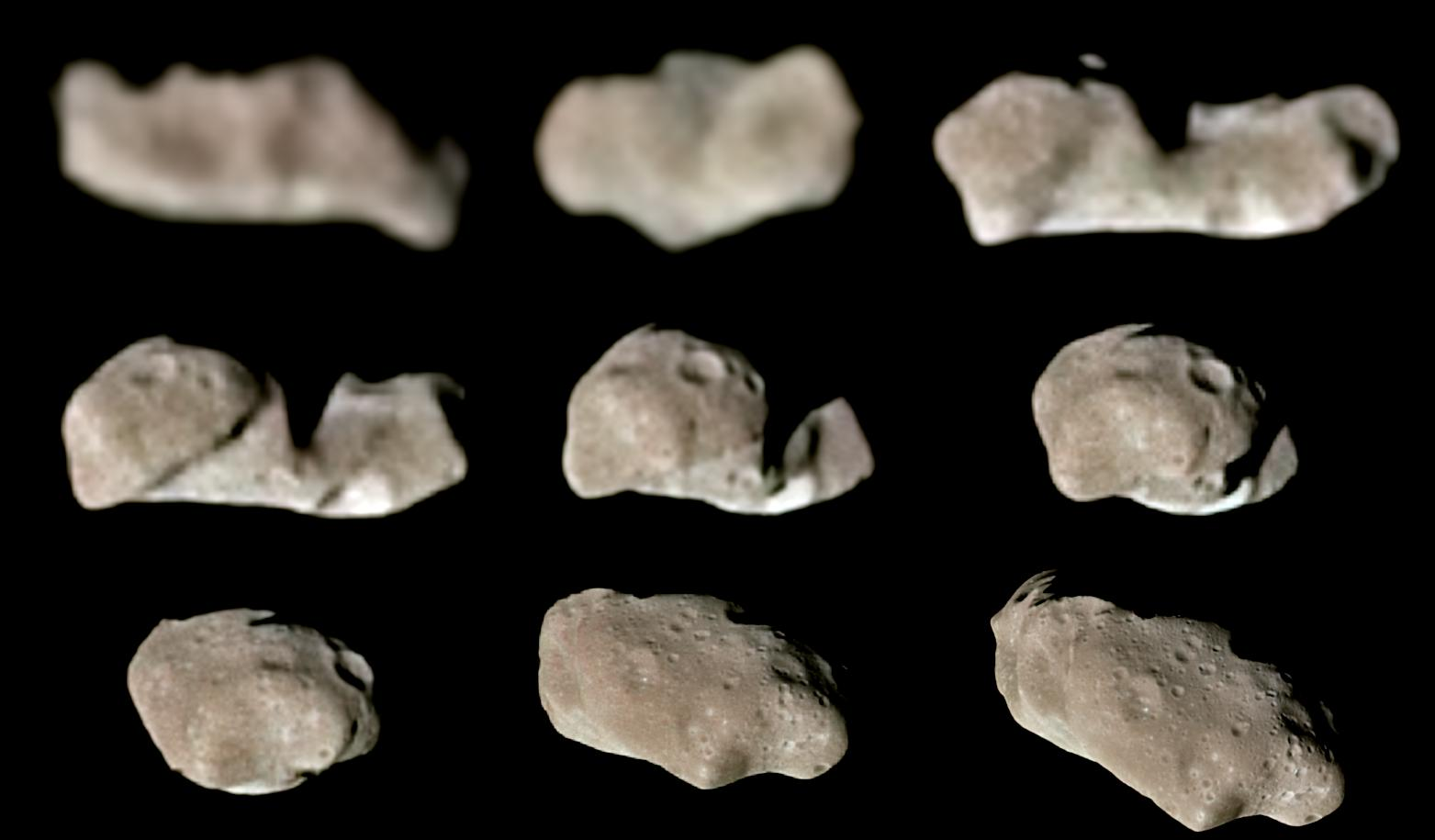
Successive images of a rotating Ida

Ida's mass is between 3.65 and 4.99 × 10^{16} kg. Its gravitational field produces an acceleration of about 0.3 to 1.1 cm/s^{2} over its surface. This field is so weak that an astronaut standing on its surface could leap from one end of Ida to the other, and an object moving in excess of 20 m/s (70 ft/s) could escape the asteroid entirely.

Ida is a distinctly elongated asteroid, with an irregular surface. Ida is 2.35 times as long as it is wide, and a "waist" separates it into two geologically dissimilar halves. This constricted shape is consistent with Ida being made of two large, solid components, with loose debris filling the gap between them. However, no such debris was seen in high-resolution images captured by Galileo. Although there are a few steep slopes tilting up to about 50° on Ida, the slope generally does not exceed 35°. Ida's irregular shape is responsible for the asteroid's very uneven gravitational field. The surface acceleration is lowest at the extremities because of their high rotational speed. It is also low near the "waist" because the mass of the asteroid is concentrated in the two halves, away from this location.

== Surface features ==
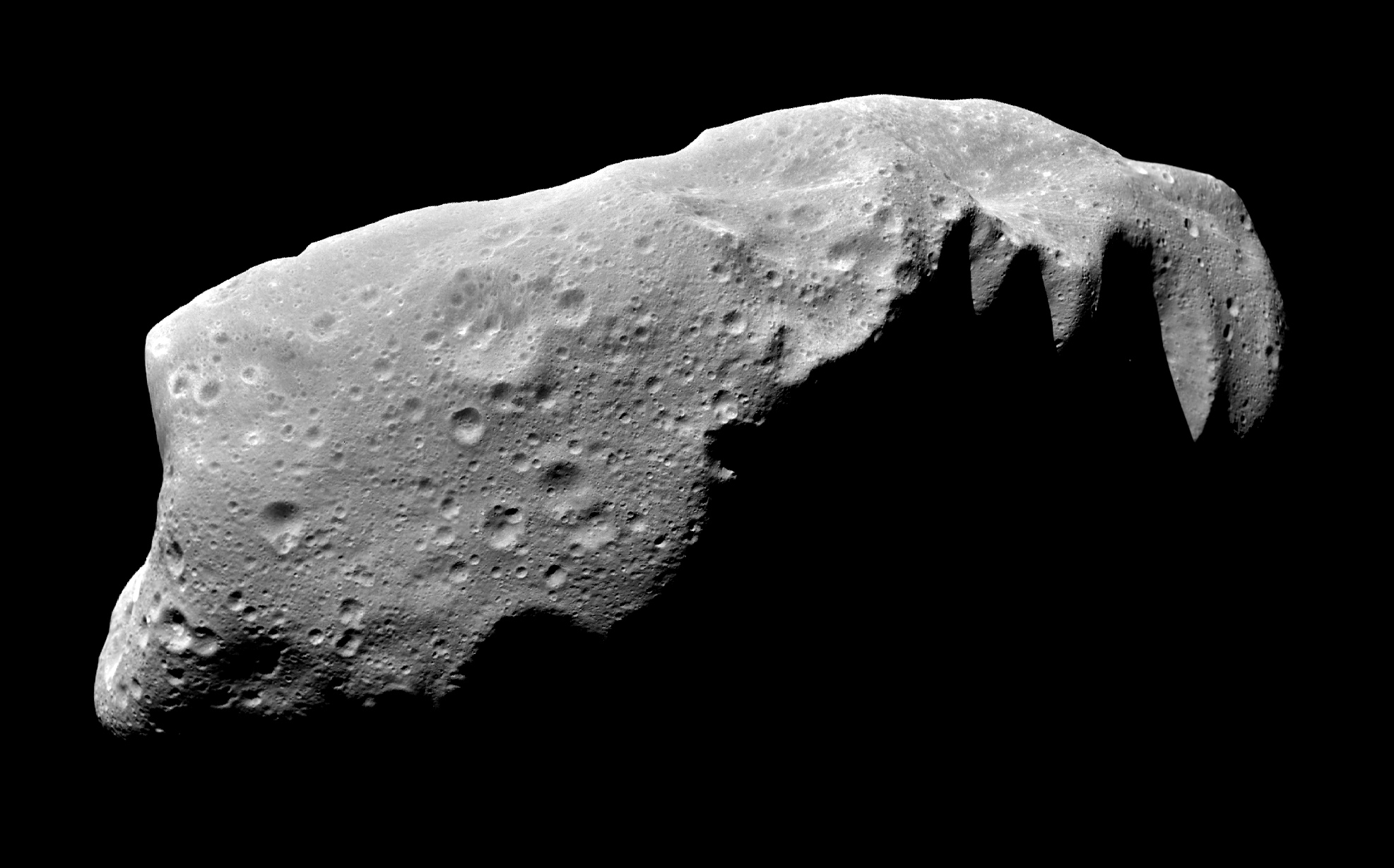
Mosaic of images recorded by Galileo 3.5 minutes before its closest approach

Ida's surface appears heavily cratered and mostly gray, although minor color variations mark newly formed or uncovered areas. Besides craters, other features are evident, such as grooves, ridges, and protrusions. Ida is covered by a thick layer of regolith, loose debris that obscures the solid rock beneath. The largest, boulder-sized, debris fragments are called ejecta blocks, several of which have been observed on the surface.

=== Regolith ===
The surface of Ida is covered in a blanket of pulverized rock, called regolith, about 50–100 m (160–330 ft) thick. This material is produced in impact events and redistributed across Ida's surface by geological processes. Galileo observed evidence of recent downslope regolith movement.

Ida's regolith is composed of the silicate minerals olivine and pyroxene. Its appearance changes over time through a process called space weathering. Because of this process, older regolith appears more red in color compared to freshly exposed material.

Galileo image of a 150 m (490 ft) block at 24.8°S, 2.8°E

About 20 large (40–150 m across) ejecta blocks have been identified, embedded in Ida's regolith. Ejecta blocks constitute the largest pieces of the regolith. Because ejecta blocks are expected to break down quickly by impact events, those present on the surface must have been either formed recently or uncovered by an impact event. Most of them are located within the craters Lascaux and Mammoth, but they may not have been produced there. This area attracts debris due to Ida's irregular gravitational field. Some blocks may have been ejected from the young crater Azzurra on the opposite side of the asteroid.

=== Structures ===
Several major structures mark Ida's surface. The asteroid appears to be split into two halves, here referred to as region 1 and region 2, connected by a "waist". This feature may have been filled in by debris, or blasted out of the asteroid by impacts.

Region 1 of Ida contains two major structures. One is a prominent 40 km (25 mi) ridge named Townsend Dorsum that stretches 150 degrees around Ida's surface. The other structure is a large indentation named Vienna Regio.

Ida's region 2 features several sets of grooves, most of which are 100 m (330 ft) wide or less and up to 4 km (2.5 mi) long. They are located near, but are not connected with, the craters Mammoth, Lascaux, and Kartchner. Some grooves are related to major impact events, for example a set opposite Vienna Regio.

=== Craters ===
Ida is one of the most densely cratered bodies yet explored in the Solar System, and impacts have been the primary process shaping its surface. Cratering has reached the saturation point, meaning that new impacts erase evidence of old ones, leaving the total crater count roughly the same. It is covered with craters of all sizes and stages of degradation, and ranging in age from fresh to as old as Ida itself. The oldest may have been formed during the breakup of the Koronis family parent body. The largest crater, Lascaux, is almost 12 km (7.5 mi) across. Region 2 contains nearly all of the craters larger than 6 km (3.7 mi) in diameter, but Region 1 has no large craters at all. Some craters are arranged in chains.

Asymmetric 1.5 km (0.93 mi) wide crater Fingal at 13.2°S, 39.9°E

Ida's major craters are named after caves and lava tubes on Earth. The crater Azzurra, for example, is named after a submerged cave on the island of Capri, also known as the Blue Grotto. Azzurra seems to be the most recent major impact on Ida. The ejecta from this collision is distributed discontinuously over Ida and is responsible for the large-scale color and albedo variations across its surface. An exception to the crater morphology is the fresh, asymmetric Fingal, which has a sharp boundary between the floor and wall on one side. Another significant crater is Afon, which marks Ida's prime meridian.

The craters are simple in structure: bowl-shaped with no flat bottoms and no central peaks. They are distributed evenly around Ida, except for a protrusion north of crater Choukoutien which is smoother and less cratered. The ejecta excavated by impacts is deposited differently on Ida than on planets because of its rapid rotation, low gravity and irregular shape. Ejecta blankets settle asymmetrically around their craters, but fast-moving ejecta that escapes from the asteroid is permanently lost.

== Composition ==
Ida was classified as an S-type asteroid based on the similarity of its reflectance spectra with similar asteroids. S-types may share their composition with stony-iron or ordinary chondrite (OC) meteorites. The composition of the interior has not been directly analyzed, but is assumed to be similar to OC material based on observed surface color changes and Ida's bulk density of 2.27–3.10 g/cm^{3}. OC meteorites contain varying amounts of the silicates olivine and pyroxene, iron, and feldspar. Olivine and pyroxene were detected on Ida by Galileo. The mineral content appears to be homogeneous throughout its extent. Galileo found minimal variations on the surface, and the asteroid's spin indicates a consistent density. Assuming that its composition is similar to OC meteorites, which range in density from 3.48 to 3.64 g/cm^{3}, Ida would have a porosity of 11–42%.

Ida's interior probably contains some amount of impact-fractured rock, called megaregolith. The megaregolith layer of Ida extends between hundreds of meters below the surface to a few kilometers. Some rock in Ida's core may have been fractured below the large craters Mammoth, Lascaux, and Undara.

== Orbit and rotation ==
Orbit and positions of Ida and five planets as of 9 March 2009

Ida is a member of the Koronis family of asteroid-belt asteroids. Ida orbits the Sun at an average distance of 2.862 AU (428.1 Gm), between the orbits of Mars and Jupiter. Ida takes 4.84089 years to complete one orbit.

Ida rotates in the retrograde direction with a rotation period of 4.63 hours (roughly 5 hours). The calculated maximum moment of inertia of a uniformly dense object the same shape as Ida coincides with the spin axis of the asteroid. This suggests that there are no major variations of density within the asteroid. Ida's axis of rotation precesses with a period of 77 thousand years, due to the gravity of the Sun acting upon the nonspherical shape of the asteroid.

== Origin ==
Ida originated in the breakup of the roughly 120 km (75 mi) diameter Koronis parent body. The progenitor asteroid had partially differentiated, with heavier metals migrating to the core. Ida carried away insignificant amounts of this core material. It is uncertain how long ago the disruption event occurred. According to an analysis of Ida's cratering processes, its surface is more than a billion years old. However, this is inconsistent with the estimated age of the Ida–Dactyl system of less than 100 million years; it is unlikely that Dactyl, due to its small size, could have escaped being destroyed in a major collision for longer. The difference in age estimates may be explained by an increased rate of cratering from the debris of the Koronis parent body's destruction.

== Dactyl ==
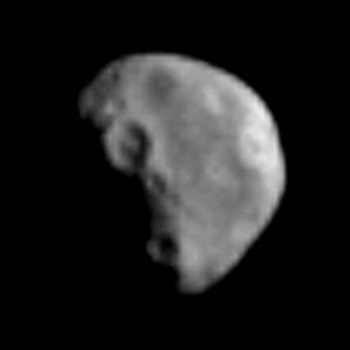
An image of Dactyl captured by the Galileo spacecraft during its 1993 flyby.

Ida has a moon named Dactyl, official designation (243) Ida I. It was discovered in images taken by the Galileo spacecraft during its flyby in 1993. These images provided the first direct confirmation of an asteroid moon. At the time, it was separated from Ida by a distance of 90 kilometres (56 mi), moving in a prograde orbit. Dactyl is heavily cratered, like Ida, and consists of similar materials. Its origin is uncertain, but evidence from the flyby suggests that it originated as a fragment of the Koronis parent body.

== See also ==
- List of geological features on 243 Ida and Dactyl
- List of minor planets
- Palisa Regio
