= Palisa Regio =

Regio on 243 Ida, an asteroid

- Feature type: Regio
- Location: 243 Ida
- Coordinates: 23.00°S 34.00°E
- Diameter: 23 km (14 mi)
- Naming: 1997
- Eponym: Johann Palisa, an Austrian astronomer

Palisa Regio is a regio, or a large area with distinct color or albedo, on 243 Ida, a main-belt asteroid. The crater was named after Johann Palisa, an Austrian astronomer, who discovered 243 Ida. The name "Palisa Regio" was officially approved by the International Astronomical Union (IAU) in 1997.

== Geology and characteristics ==
Located at 23.00°S 34.00°E, Palisa Regio has a diameter of 23 kilometres (14 mi). It is slightly concave and some astronomers suggest that it might be a highly degraded ancient crater.
