= Ballistic capture =

Type of low-energy spacecraft transfer

Ballistic capture is a low energy method for a spacecraft to achieve an orbit around a distant planet or moon with no fuel required to go into orbit. In the ideal case, the transfer is ballistic (requiring zero Delta-v) after launch. In the traditional alternative to ballistic capture, spacecraft would either use a Hohmann transfer orbit or Oberth effect, which requires the spacecraft to burn fuel in order to slow down at the target. A requirement for the spacecraft to carry fuel adds to its cost and complexity.

To achieve ballistic capture the spacecraft is placed on a flight path ahead of the target's orbital path. The spacecraft then falls into the desired orbit, requiring only minor orbit corrections which may only need low power ion thrusters.

The first paper on using ballistic capture for transfer designed for spacecraft was written in 1987. The mathematical theory that describes ballistic capture is called Weak Stability Boundary theory.

Ballistic capture was first used by the Japanese spacecraft Hiten in 1991 as a method to get to the Moon. This was designed by Edward Belbruno and J. Miller. The ballistic capture transfer that performed this is an exterior ballistic capture transfer since it goes beyond the Earth–Moon distance. An interior ballistic capture transfer stays within the Earth–Moon distance. This was described in 1987 and was first used by the ESA SMART-1 spacecraft in 2004.

== Advantages ==
Ballistic capture is predicted to be:

- safer, as there is no time-critical orbit insertion burn,
- launchable at almost any time, rather than having to wait for a narrow launch window,
- more fuel efficient for some missions.

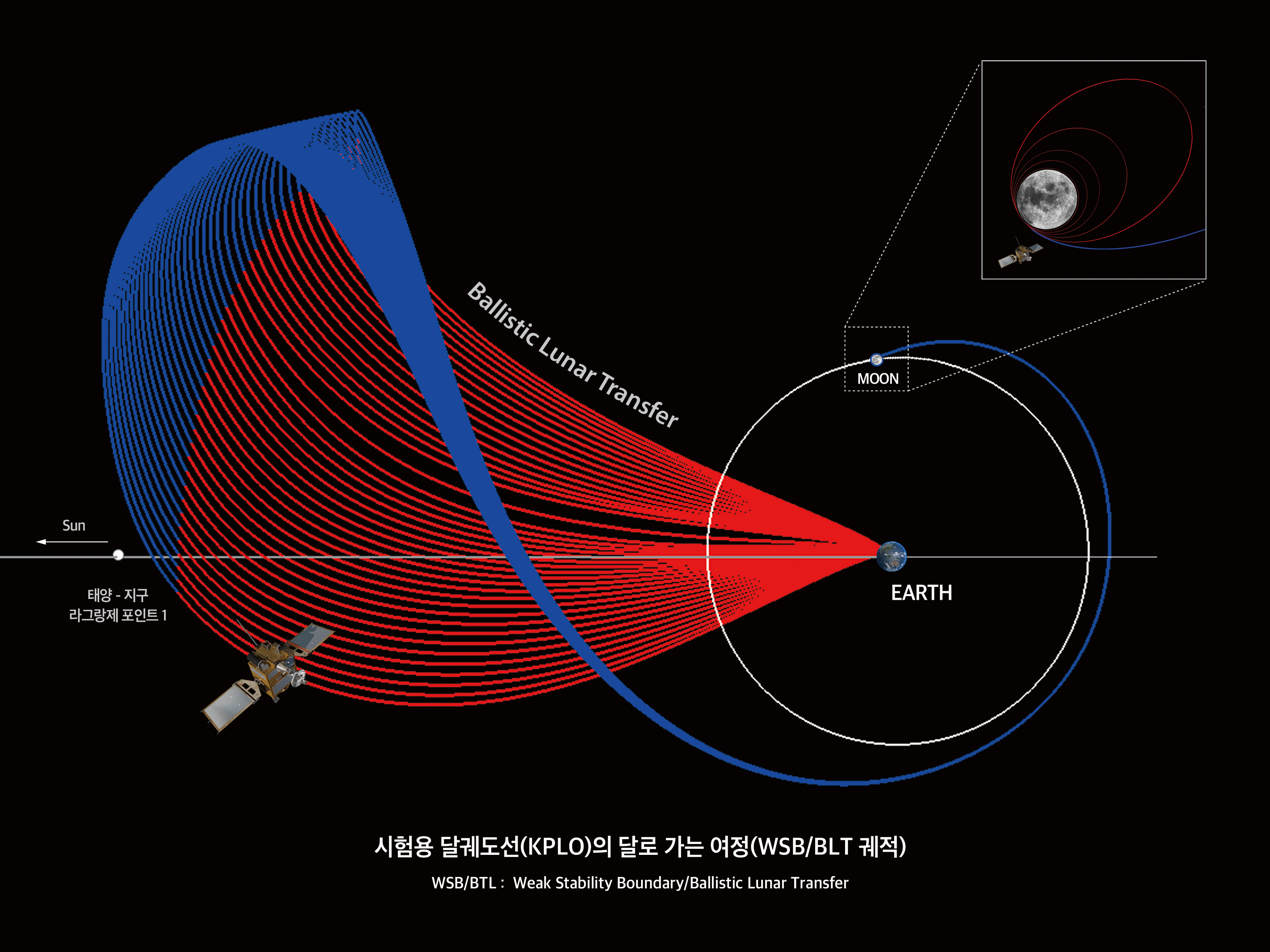
The trajectory of KPLO (Danuri) between Earth, Lagrange point #1, and Moon

== Low-energy transfer ==
Trajectories that use ballistic capture are also known as a Low energy transfer (LET). More precisely, the terminology ballistic capture transfer (BCT) is used. They are low energy because they use no delta-V for capture. However, a low energy transfer need not be a ballistic capture transfer. The term ballistic lunar transfer (BLT) is also sometimes used.

The region about a target body where ballistic capture occurs is called a weak stability boundary. The term weak stability boundary transfer is also used, or for short, WSB transfer.

In 2014, ballistic capture transfer was proposed as an alternate low energy transfer for future Mars missions. It can be performed anytime, not only once per 26 months as in other maneuvers and does not involve dangerous and expensive (fuel cost) braking. But it takes up to one year, instead of nine months for a Hohmann transfer.

== Missions using ballistic capture ==
Animation of BepiColombo's trajectory from 20 October 2018 to 6 April 2027 BepiColombo · Earth · Venus · Mercury · Sun For more detailed animation, see this video

The following missions have used ballistic capture transfers (EBCT – Exterior ballistic capture transfer, IBCT – Interior ballistic capture transfer):

Missions using ballistic capture
Mission	Agency	Launch	Method
Hiten	ISAS	1991	EBCT
SMART-1	ESA	2004	IBCT
GRAIL	NASA	2011	EBCT
BepiColombo	ESA	2018	Ballistic capture - Mercury in 2025
CAPSTONE	NASA	2022	EBCT
Danuri	KARI	2022	EBCT
Hakuto-R Mission 1	ispace	2022	EBCT
SLIM	JAXA/ISAS	2023	EBCT

== See also ==
- Trans-lunar injection
- Asteroid capture
- Gravitational capture
