= Weak stability boundary =

Physics algorithm

Weak stability boundary (WSB), including low-energy transfer, is a concept introduced by Edward Belbruno in 1987. The concept explained how a spacecraft could change orbits using very little fuel.

Weak stability boundary is defined for the three-body problem. This problem considers the motion of a particle P of negligible mass moving with respect to two larger bodies, P1, P2, modeled as point masses, where these bodies move in circular or elliptical orbits with respect to each other, and P2 is smaller than P1.

The force between the three bodies is the classical Newtonian gravitational force. For example, P1 is the Earth, P2 is the Moon and P is a spacecraft; or P1 is the Sun, P2 is Jupiter and P is a comet, etc. This model is called the restricted three-body problem. The weak stability boundary defines a region about P2 where P is temporarily captured. This region is in position-velocity space. Capture means that the Kepler energy between P and P2 is negative. This is also called weak capture.

== Background ==
This boundary was defined for the first time by Edward Belbruno of Princeton University in 1987. He described a Low-energy transfer which would allow a spacecraft to change orbits using very little fuel. It was for motion about Moon (P2) with P1 = Earth. It is defined algorithmically by monitoring cycling motion of P about the Moon and finding the region where cycling motion transitions between stable and unstable after one cycle. Stable motion means P can completely cycle about the Moon for one cycle relative to a reference section, starting in weak capture. P needs to return to the reference section with negative Kepler energy. Otherwise, the motion is called unstable, where P does not return to the reference section within one cycle or if it returns, it has non-negative Kepler energy.

The set of all transition points about the Moon comprises the weak stability boundary, W. The motion of P is sensitive or chaotic as it moves about the Moon within W. A mathematical proof that the motion within W is chaotic was given in 2004. This is accomplished by showing that the set W about an arbitrary body P2 in the restricted three-body problem contains a hyperbolic invariant set of fractional dimension consisting of the infinitely many intersections Hyperbolic manifolds.

The weak stability boundary was originally referred to as the fuzzy boundary. This term was used since the transition between capture and escape defined in the algorithm is not well defined and limited by the numerical accuracy. This defines a "fuzzy" location for the transition points. It is also due the inherent chaos in the motion of P near the transition points. It can be thought of as a fuzzy chaos region. As is described in an article in Discover magazine, the WSB can be roughly viewed as the fuzzy edge of a region, referred to as a gravity well, about a body (the Moon), where its force of gravity becomes small enough to be dominated by force of gravity of another body (the Earth) and the motion there is chaotic.

A much more general algorithm defining W was given in 2007. It defines W relative to n-cycles, where n = 1,2,3,..., yielding boundaries of order n. This gives a much more complex region consisting of the union of all the weak stability boundaries of order n. This definition was explored further in 2010. The results suggested that W consists, in part, of the hyperbolic network of invariant manifolds associated to the Lyapunov orbits about the L1, L2 Lagrange points near P2. The explicit determination of the set W about P2 = Jupiter, where P1 is the Sun, is described in "Computation of Weak Stability Boundaries: Sun-Jupiter Case". It turns out that a weak stability region can also be defined relative to the larger mass point, P1. A proof of the existence of the weak stability boundary about P1 was given in 2012, but a different definition is used. The chaos of the motion is analytically proven in "Geometry of Weak Stability Boundaries". The boundary is studied in "Applicability and Dynamical Characterization of the Associated Sets of the Algorithmic Weak Stability Boundary in the Lunar Sphere of Influence".

== Applications ==
There are a number of important applications for the weak stability boundary (WSB). Since the WSB defines a region of temporary capture, it can be used, for example, to find transfer trajectories from the Earth to the Moon that arrive at the Moon within the WSB region in weak capture, which is called ballistic capture for a spacecraft. No fuel is required for capture in this case. This was numerically demonstrated in 1987. This is the first reference for ballistic capture for spacecraft and definition of the weak stability boundary. The boundary was operationally demonstrated to exist in 1991 when it was used to find a ballistic capture transfer to the Moon for Japan's Hiten spacecraft. Other missions have used the same transfer type as Hiten, including Grail, Capstone, Danuri, Hakuto-R Mission 1 and SLIM. The WSB for Mars is studied in "Earth-Mars Transfers with Ballistic Capture" and ballistic capture transfers to Mars are computed. The BepiColombo mission of ESA should achieve ballistic capture at the WSB of Mercury in November 2026.

The WSB region can be used in the field of Astrophysics. It can be defined for stars within open star clusters. This is done in "Chaotic Exchange of Solid Material Between Planetary Systems: Implications for the Lithopanspermia Hypothesis" to analyze the capture of solid material that may have arrived on the Earth early in the age of the Solar System to study the validity of the lithopanspermia hypothesis.

Numerical explorations of trajectories for P starting in the WSB region about P2 show that after the particle P escapes P2 at the end of weak capture, it moves about the primary body, P1, in a near resonant orbit, in resonance with P2 about P1. This property was used to study comets that move in orbits about the Sun in orbital resonance with Jupiter, which change resonance orbits by becoming weakly captured by Jupiter. An example of such a comet is 39P/Oterma.

This property of change of resonance of orbits about P1 when P is weakly captured by the WSB of P2 has an interesting application to the field of quantum mechanics to the motion of an electron about the proton in a hydrogen atom. The transition motion of an electron about the proton between different energy states described by the Schrödinger equation is shown to be equivalent to the change of resonance of P about P1 via weak capture by P2 for a family of transitioning resonance orbits. This gives a classical model using chaotic dynamics with Newtonian gravity for the motion of an electron.

== See also ==
- Interplanetary Transport Network – uses WSB for low‑energy travel
- Invariant manifold – manifolds underpin WSB trajectory structures
- Hill sphere – defines body's gravitational influence boundary
