= Sun orbit =

Sun orbit may refer to:

- Heliocentric orbit, around the Sun
- Orbit of the Sun around the Galactic Center
