= Trans-lunar injection =

Propulsive maneuver used to arrive at the Moon

Lunar transfer, perspective view. TLI occurs at the red dot near Earth.

A trans-lunar injection (TLI) is a propulsive maneuver used to send a spacecraft toward the Moon. Typical lunar transfer trajectories approximate Hohmann transfers, although low-energy transfers have also been used in some cases, as with the Hiten probe. For short duration missions without significant perturbations from sources outside the Earth-Moon system, a fast Hohmann transfer is typically more practical.

A spacecraft performs TLI to begin a lunar transfer from a low circular parking orbit around Earth. The large TLI burn, usually performed by a chemical rocket engine, increases the spacecraft's velocity, changing its orbit from a circular low Earth orbit to a highly eccentric orbit. The mission phase following TLI – while the spacecraft is flying passively towards the moon under its own momentum and influenced by terrestrial and lunar gravity – is called translunar coast. As the spacecraft begins coasting on the lunar transfer arc, its trajectory approximates an elliptical orbit about the Earth with an apogee near to the radius of the Moon's orbit. The TLI burn is sized and timed to precisely target the Moon as it revolves around the Earth. The burn is timed so that the spacecraft nears apogee as the Moon approaches. Finally, the spacecraft enters the Moon's sphere of influence, making a hyperbolic lunar swingby.

== Free return ==
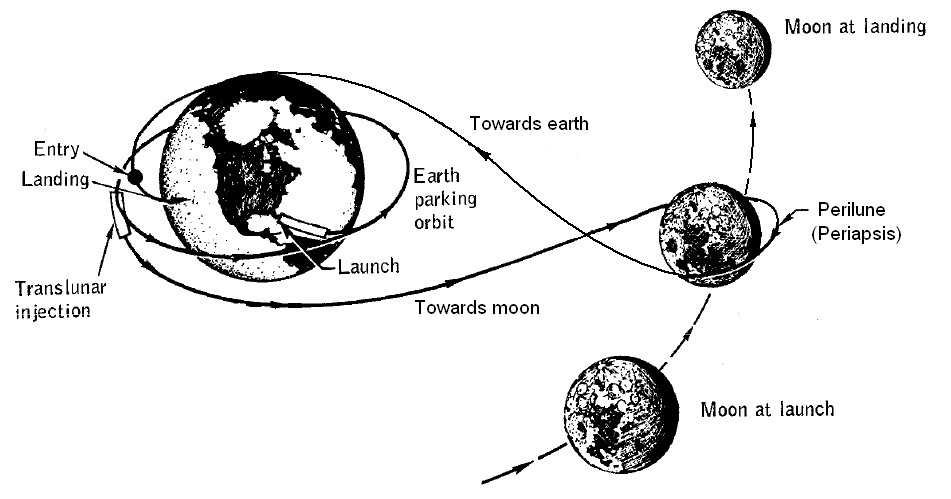
Sketch of a circumlunar free return trajectory (not to scale)

In some cases it is possible to design a TLI to target a free return trajectory, so that the spacecraft will loop around behind the Moon and return to Earth without need for further propulsive maneuvers.

Such free return trajectories add a margin of safety and cost-effectiveness to human spaceflight missions, since the spacecraft will return to Earth "for free" after the initial TLI burn. The Apollos 8, 10 and 11 began on a free return trajectory, while the later missions used a functionally similar hybrid trajectory, in which a midway course correction is required to reach the Moon. Artemis I and II were both also free return missions.

== Modeling ==
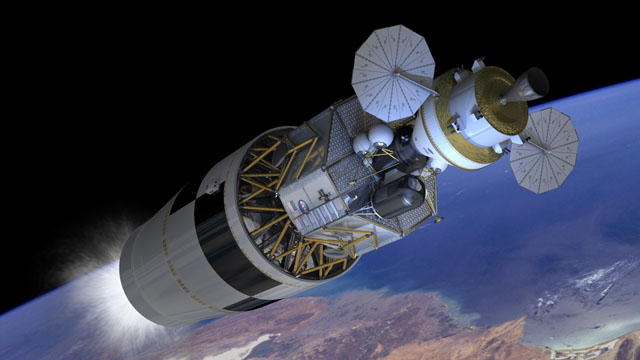
Artist's concept of NASA's Constellation stack performing the trans-lunar injection burn

=== Patched conics ===
TLI targeting and lunar transfers are a specific application of the n body problem, which may be approximated in various ways. The simplest way to explore lunar transfer trajectories is by the method of patched conics. The spacecraft is assumed to accelerate only under classical 2 body dynamics, being dominated by the Earth until it reaches the Moon's sphere of influence. Motion in a patched-conic system is deterministic and simple to calculate, lending itself for rough mission design and "back of the envelope" studies.

=== Restricted circular three body (RC3B) ===
More realistically, however, the spacecraft is subject to gravitational forces from many bodies. Gravitation from Earth and Moon dominate the spacecraft's acceleration, and since the spacecraft's own mass is negligible in comparison, the spacecraft's trajectory may be better approximated as a restricted three-body problem. This model is a closer approximation but lacks an analytic solution, requiring numerical integration.

=== High fidelity numerical propagation and perturbation models ===
More detailed simulation involves modeling the Moon's true orbital motion; gravitation from other astronomical bodies; the non-uniformity of the Earth's and Moon's gravity; including solar radiation pressure; and so on. Propagating spacecraft motion in such a model is numerically intensive, but necessary for true mission accuracy.

==== See Also ====
- Runge–Kutta–Fehlberg method
- Dormand–Prince method

== History ==
Animation of GRAIL-A's trajectory GRAIL-A · Moon · Earth

Animation of Chandrayaan-2's trajectory Earth · Moon · Chandrayaan-2

Animation of LRO trajectory Lunar Reconnaissance Orbiter · Earth · Moon

The first space probe to attempt TLI was the Soviet Union's Luna 1 on January 2, 1959 which was designed to impact the Moon. The burn however didn't go exactly as planned and the spacecraft missed the Moon by more than three times its radius and was sent into a heliocentric orbit. Luna 2 performed the same maneuver more accurately on September 12, 1959 and crashed into the Moon two days later. The Soviets repeated this success with 22 more Luna missions and 5 Zond missions reaching the Moon's vicinity between 1959 and 1976.

The United States launched its first lunar impactor attempt, Ranger 3, on January 26, 1962, which failed to reach the Moon. This was followed by the first US success, Ranger 4, on April 23, 1962. Another 27 US missions to lunar space were launched from 1962 to 1973, including five successful Surveyor soft landers, five Lunar Orbiter surveillance probes, and nine Apollo missions, which landed the first humans on the Moon.

For the Apollo lunar missions, TLI was performed by the restartable J-2 engine in the S-IVB third stage of the Saturn V rocket. This particular TLI burn lasted approximately 350 seconds, providing 3.05 to 3.25 km/s (10,000 to 10,600 ft/s) of change in velocity, at which point the spacecraft was traveling at approximately 10.4 km/s (34150 ft/s) relative to the Earth. The Apollo 8 TLI was spectacularly observed from the Hawaiian Islands in the pre-dawn sky south of Waikiki, photographed and reported in the papers the next day. In 1969, the Apollo 10 pre-dawn TLI was visible from Cloncurry, Australia. It was described as resembling car headlights coming over a hill in fog, with the spacecraft appearing as a bright comet with a greenish tinge.

In 1990 Japan launched its first lunar mission, using the Hiten satellite to fly by the Moon and place the Hagoromo microsatellite in a lunar orbit. Following that, it explored a novel low delta-v TLI method with a 6-month transfer time (compared to 3 days for Apollo).

The 1994 US Clementine spacecraft, designed to showcase lightweight technologies, used a 3 week long TLI with two intermediate Earth flybys before entering a lunar orbit.

In 1997 Asiasat-3 became the first commercial satellite to reach the Moon's sphere of influence when, after a launch failure, it swung by the Moon twice as a low delta-v way to reach its desired geostationary orbit. It passed within 6200 km of the Moon's surface.

The 2003 ESA SMART-1 technology demonstrator satellite became the first European satellite to orbit the Moon. After being launched into a geostationary transfer orbit (GTO), it used solar powered ion engines for propulsion. As a result of its extremely low delta-v TLI maneuver, the spacecraft took over 13 months to reach a lunar orbit and 17 months to reach its desired orbit.

China launched its first Moon mission in 2007, placing the Chang'e 1 spacecraft in a lunar orbit. It used multiple burns to slowly raise its apogee to reach the vicinity of the Moon.

India followed in 2008, launching the Chandrayaan-1 into a GTO and, like the Chinese spacecraft, increasing its apogee over a number of burns.

The soft lander Beresheet from the Israel Aerospace Industries, used this maneuver in 2019, but crashed on the Moon.

In 2011 the NASA GRAIL satellites used a low delta-v route to the Moon, passing by the Sun-Earth L1 point, and taking over 3 months.

== See also ==
- Astrodynamics – Field of classical mechanics concerned with the motion of spacecraft
- Comparison of super heavy lift launch systems – Comparison of all orbital launch systems
- Low energy transfer – Fuel-efficient orbital maneuver
- Trans-Earth injection – Space flight maneuver
- Trans-Mars injection – Orbit around the barycenter of the Sun
