= Interplanetary spaceflight =

Crewed or uncrewed travel between stars or planets

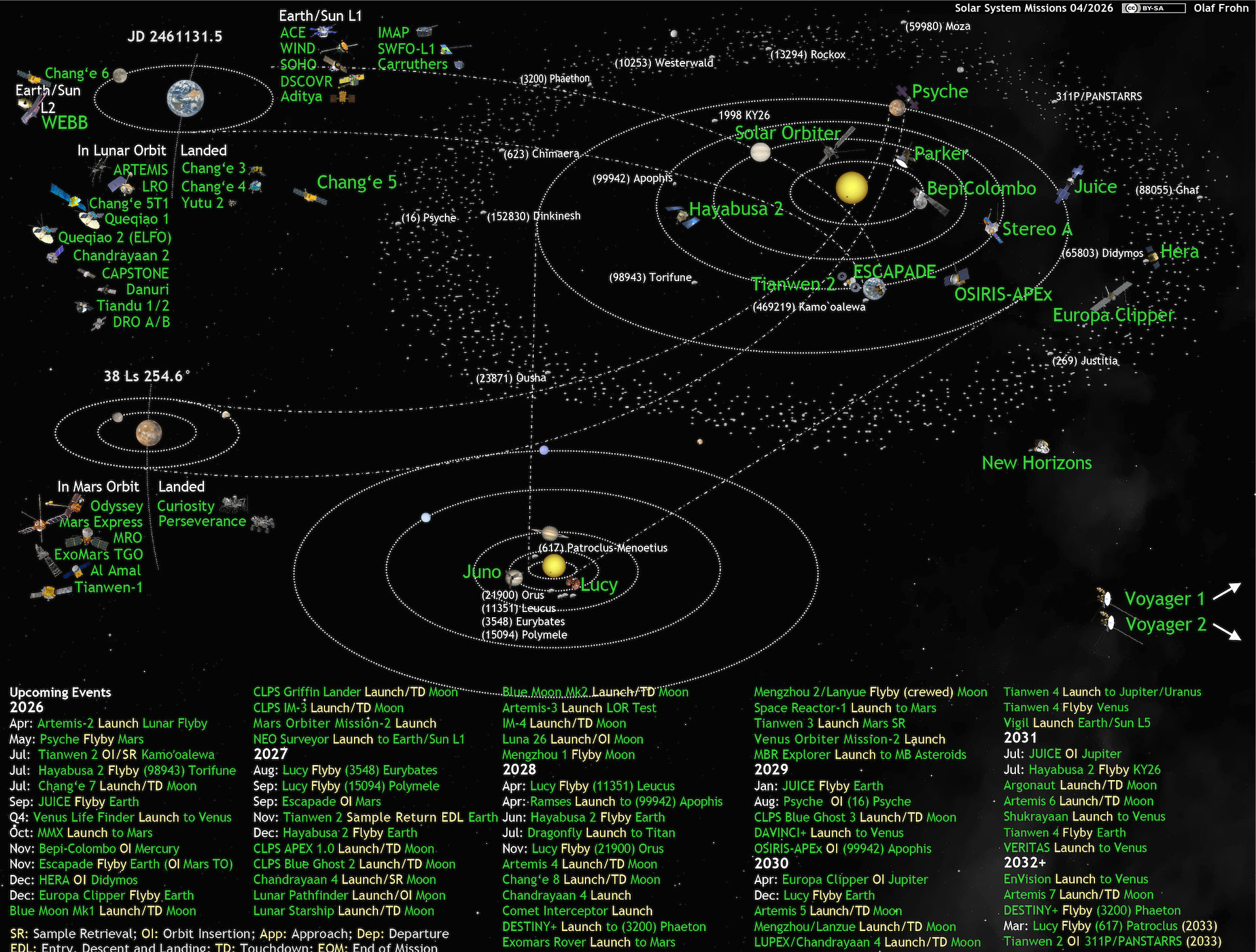
All active Solar System space probes in 2026 (and a list of upcoming ones)

Interplanetary spaceflight or interplanetary travel is spaceflight (crewed or uncrewed) between planets within a single planetary system. Spaceflights become interplanetary by accelerating spacecraft beyond orbital speed, reaching escape velocity relative to Earth at 11.2 km/s, entering heliocentric orbit, possibly accelerating further, often by performing gravity assist flybys at Earth and other planets. Most of today's spaceflight remains Earth bound, with much less being interplanetary, all of which performed by uncrewed spacecraft, and only just a few spaceflights having accelerated beyond, to system escape velocity, eventually performing interstellar spaceflight.

Uncrewed space probes have flown to all the observed planets in the Solar System as well as to dwarf planets Pluto and Ceres, and several asteroids. Orbiters and landers return more information than fly-by missions. Crewed flights have landed on the Moon and have been planned, from time to time, for Mars, Venus and Mercury. While many scientists appreciate the knowledge value that uncrewed flights provide, the value of crewed missions is more controversial. Science fiction writers propose a number of benefits, including the mining of asteroids, access to solar power, and room for colonization in the event of an Earth catastrophe.

A number of techniques have been developed to make interplanetary flights more economical. Advances in computing and theoretical science have already improved some techniques, while new proposals may lead to improvements in speed, fuel economy, and safety. Travel techniques must take into consideration the velocity changes necessary to travel from one body to another in the Solar System. For orbital flights, an additional adjustment must be made to match the orbital speed of the destination body. Other developments are designed to improve rocket launching and propulsion, as well as the use of non-traditional sources of energy. Using extraterrestrial resources for energy, oxygen, and water would reduce costs and improve life support systems.

Any crewed interplanetary flight must include certain design requirements. Life support systems must be capable of supporting human lives for extended periods of time. Preventative measures are needed to reduce exposure to radiation and ensure optimum reliability.

== Current achievements in interplanetary travel ==
Timelapse of Voyager 2 approaching Jupiter.

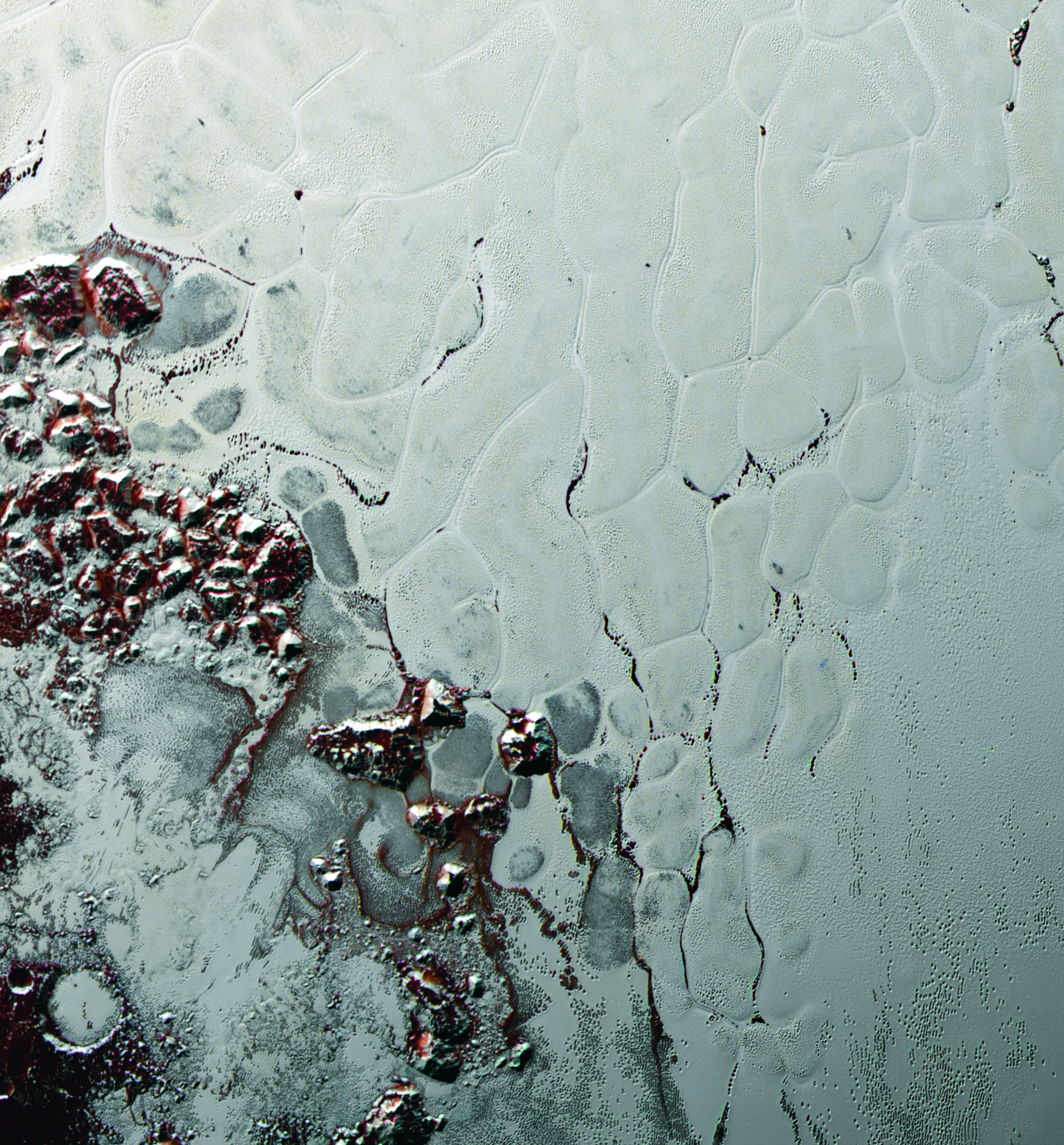
The plains of Pluto, as seen by New Horizons after its nearly 10-year voyage

Remotely guided space probes have flown by all of the observed planets of the Solar System from Mercury to Neptune, with the New Horizons probe having flown by the dwarf planet Pluto and the Dawn spacecraft currently orbiting the dwarf planet Ceres. The most distant spacecraft, Voyager 1 and Voyager 2, have entered interstellar space as of 8 December 2018, while Pioneer 10, Pioneer 11, and New Horizons are on course to enter it as well.

In general, planetary orbiters and landers return much more detailed and comprehensive information than fly-by missions. Space probes have been placed into orbit around all the five planets known in antiquity: The first being Venus (Venera 7, 1970), Mars (Mariner 9, 1971), Jupiter (Galileo, 1995), Saturn (Cassini/Huygens, 2004), and most recently Mercury (MESSENGER, March 2011), and have returned data about these bodies and their natural satellites.

OSIRIS-REx collecting a sample from asteroid 101955 Bennu — (Full-sized image)

The NEAR Shoemaker mission in 2000 orbited the large near-Earth asteroid 433 Eros, and was even successfully landed there, though it had not been designed with this maneuver in mind. The Japanese ion-drive spacecraft Hayabusa in 2005 also orbited the small near-Earth asteroid 25143 Itokawa, landing on it briefly and returning grains of its surface material to Earth. Another ion-drive mission, Dawn, has orbited the large asteroid Vesta (July 2011 – September 2012) and later moved on to the dwarf planet Ceres, arriving in March 2015.

WISPR of the Parker Solar Probe took this visible light footage of the nightside of Venus in 2021, showing the hot faintly glowing surface, and its Aphrodite Terra as large dark patch, through the clouds, which prohibit such observations on the dayside when they are illuminated. Possibly representing the illusive ashen light.

Remotely controlled landers such as Viking, Pathfinder and the two Mars Exploration Rovers have landed on the surface of Mars and several Venera and Vega spacecraft have landed on the surface of Venus, with the latter deploying balloons to the planet's atmosphere. The Huygens probe successfully landed on Saturn's moon, Titan.

No crewed missions have been sent to any planet of the Solar System. NASA's Apollo program, however, landed twelve people on the Moon and returned them to Earth. The American Vision for Space Exploration, originally introduced by U.S. President George W. Bush and put into practice through the Constellation program, had as a long-term goal to eventually send human astronauts to Mars. However, on February 1, 2010, President Barack Obama proposed cancelling the program in Fiscal Year 2011. An earlier project which received some significant planning by NASA included a crewed fly-by of Venus in the Manned Venus Flyby mission, but was cancelled when the Apollo Applications Program was terminated due to NASA budget cuts in the late 1960s.

== Reasons for interplanetary travel ==
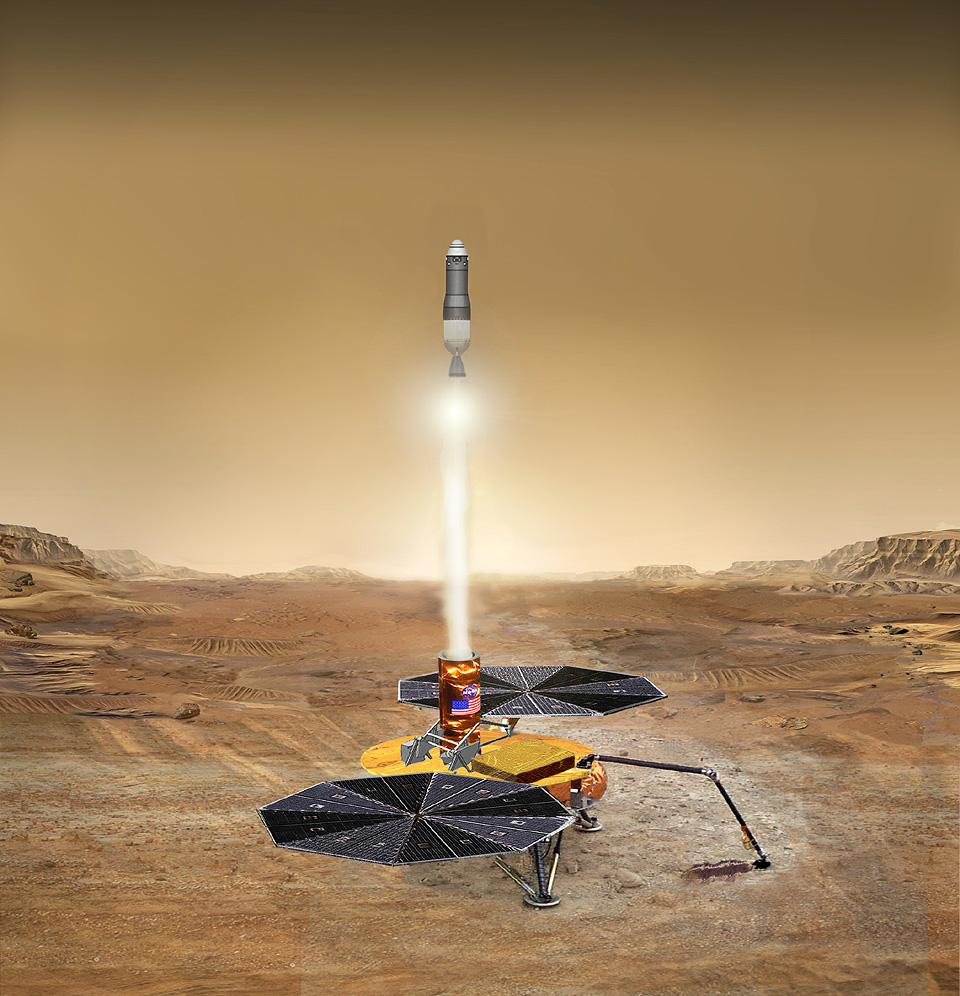
Launch concept of an interplanetary Mars sample-return mission.

The costs and risk of interplanetary travel receive a lot of publicity—spectacular examples include the malfunctions or complete failures of probes without a human crew, such as Mars 96, Deep Space 2, and Beagle 2 (the article List of Solar System probes gives a full list).

Many astronomers, geologists and biologists believe that exploration of the Solar System provides knowledge that could not be gained by observations from Earth's surface or from orbit around Earth. However, they disagree about whether human-crewed missions justify their cost and risk. Critics of human spaceflight argue that robotic probes are more cost-effective, producing more scientific knowledge per dollar spent; robots do not need costly life-support systems, can be sent on one-way missions, and are becoming more capable as artificial intelligence advances. Others argue that either astronauts or spacefaring scientists, advised by Earth-based scientists, can respond more flexibly and intelligently to new or unexpected features of whatever region they are exploring.

Some members of the general public mainly value space activities for whatever tangible benefits they may deliver to themselves or to the human race as a whole. So far the only benefits of this type have been "spin-off" technologies which were developed for space missions and then were found to be at least as useful in other activities. However, public support, at least in the US, remains higher for basic scientific research than for human space flight; a 2023 survey found that Americans rate basic research as their third-highest priority for NASA, after monitoring Earth-endangering asteroids and understanding climate change. Support for scientific research is about four times higher than for human flight to the Moon or Mars.

Besides spinoffs, other practical motivations for interplanetary travel are more speculative. But science fiction writers have a fairly good track record in predicting future technologies—for example geosynchronous communications satellites (Arthur C. Clarke) and many aspects of computer technology (Mack Reynolds).

Many science fiction stories feature detailed descriptions of how people could extract minerals from asteroids and energy from sources including orbital solar panels (unhampered by clouds) and the very strong magnetic field of Jupiter. Some claim that such techniques may be the only way to provide rising standards of living without being stopped by pollution or by depletion of Earth's resources (for example peak oil).

There are also non-scientific motives for human spaceflight, such as adventure or the belief that humans have a spiritually fated destiny in space.

Finally, establishing completely self-sufficient colonies in other parts of the Solar System could, if feasible, prevent the human species from being exterminated by several possible events (see Human extinction). One of these possible events is an asteroid impact like the one which may have resulted in the Cretaceous–Paleogene extinction event. Although various Spaceguard projects monitor the Solar System for objects that might come dangerously close to Earth, current asteroid deflection strategies are crude and untested. To make the task more difficult, carbonaceous chondrites are rather sooty and therefore very hard to detect. Although carbonaceous chondrites are thought to be rare, some are very large and the suspected "dinosaur-killer" may have been a carbonaceous chondrite.

Some scientists, including members of the Space Studies Institute, argue that the vast majority of mankind eventually will live in space and will benefit from doing so.

== Economical travel techniques ==
View of Earth from MESSENGER as it performs a flyby to reach Mercury via gravity assist.

Map of the needed delta-v to travel directly (without gravity assist) to the main bodies in the Solar System (assuming burns are at periapsis, and inclination changes are ignored)

One of the main challenges in interplanetary travel is producing the very large velocity changes necessary to travel from one body to another in the Solar System.

Due to the Sun's gravitational pull, a spacecraft moving farther from the Sun will slow down, while a spacecraft moving closer will speed up. Also, since any two planets are at different distances from the Sun, the planet from which the spacecraft starts is moving around the Sun at a different speed than the planet to which the spacecraft is travelling (in accordance with Kepler's Third Law). Because of these facts, a spacecraft desiring to transfer to a planet closer to the Sun must decrease its speed with respect to the Sun by a large amount in order to intercept it, while a spacecraft traveling to a planet farther out from the Sun must increase its speed substantially. Then, if additionally the spacecraft wishes to enter into orbit around the destination planet (instead of just flying by it), it must match the planet's orbital speed around the Sun, usually requiring another large velocity change.

Simply doing this by brute force – accelerating in the shortest route to the destination and then matching the planet's speed – would require an extremely large amount of fuel. And the fuel required for producing these velocity changes has to be launched along with the payload, and therefore even more fuel is needed to put both the spacecraft and the fuel required for its interplanetary journey into orbit. Thus, several techniques have been devised to reduce the fuel requirements of interplanetary travel.

As an example of the velocity changes involved, a spacecraft travelling from low Earth orbit to Mars using a simple trajectory must first undergo a change in speed (also known as a delta-v), in this case an increase, of about 3.8 km/s. Then, after intercepting Mars, it must change its speed by another 2.3 km/s in order to match Mars' orbital speed around the Sun and enter an orbit around it. For comparison, launching a spacecraft into low Earth orbit requires a change in speed of about 9.5 km/s.

=== Hohmann transfers ===
Hohmann Transfer Orbit: a spaceship leaves from point 2 in Earth's orbit and arrives at point 3 in Mars' (not to scale).

For many years economical interplanetary travel meant using the Hohmann transfer orbit. Hohmann demonstrated that the lowest energy route between any two orbits is an elliptical "orbit" which forms a tangent to the starting and destination orbits. Once the spacecraft arrives, a second application of thrust will re-circularize the orbit at the new location. In the case of planetary transfers this means directing the spacecraft, originally in an orbit almost identical to Earth's, so that the aphelion of the transfer orbit is on the far side of the Sun near the orbit of the other planet. A spacecraft traveling from Earth to Mars via this method will arrive near Mars orbit in approximately 8.5 months, but because the orbital velocity is greater when closer to the center of mass (i.e. the Sun) and slower when farther from the center, the spacecraft will be traveling quite slowly and a small application of thrust is all that is needed to put it into a circular orbit around Mars. If the manoeuver is timed properly, Mars will be "arriving" under the spacecraft when this happens.

The Hohmann transfer applies to any two orbits, not just those with planets involved. For instance it is the most common way to transfer satellites into geostationary orbit, after first being "parked" in low Earth orbit. However, the Hohmann transfer takes an amount of time similar to ½ of the orbital period of the outer orbit, so in the case of the outer planets this is many years – too long to wait. It is also based on the assumption that the points at both ends are massless, as in the case when transferring between two orbits around Earth for instance. With a planet at the destination end of the transfer, calculations become considerably more difficult.

=== Gravitational slingshot ===
Plot of Voyager 2's heliocentric velocity against its distance from the Sun, illustrating the use of gravity assist to accelerate the spacecraft by Jupiter, Saturn and Uranus. To observe Triton, Voyager 2 passed over Neptune's north pole resulting in an acceleration out of the plane of the ecliptic and reduced velocity away from the Sun.

The gravitational slingshot technique uses the gravity of planets and moons to change the speed and direction of a spacecraft without using fuel. In typical example, a spacecraft is sent to a distant planet on a path that is much faster than what the Hohmann transfer would call for. This would typically mean that it would arrive at the planet's orbit and continue past it. However, if there is a planet between the departure point and the target, it can be used to bend the path toward the target, and in many cases the overall travel time is greatly reduced. A prime example of this are the two crafts of the Voyager program, which used slingshot effects to change trajectories several times in the outer Solar System. It is difficult to use this method for journeys in the inner part of the Solar System, although it is possible to use other nearby planets such as Venus or even the Moon as slingshots in journeys to the outer planets.

This maneuver can only change an object's velocity relative to a third, uninvolved object, – possibly the "centre of mass" or the Sun. There is no change in the velocities of the two objects involved in the maneuver relative to each other. The Sun cannot be used in a gravitational slingshot because it is stationary compared to rest of the Solar System, which orbits the Sun. It may be used to send a spaceship or probe into the galaxy because the Sun revolves around the center of the Milky Way.

=== Powered slingshot ===
A powered slingshot is the use of a rocket engine at or around closest approach to a body (periapsis). The use at this point multiplies up the effect of the delta-v, and gives a bigger effect than at other times.

=== Fuzzy orbits ===
Computers did not exist when Hohmann transfer orbits were first proposed (1925) and were slow, expensive and unreliable when gravitational slingshots were developed (1959). Recent advances in computing have made it possible to exploit many more features of the gravity fields of astronomical bodies and thus calculate even lower-cost trajectories. Paths have been calculated which link the Lagrange points of the various planets into the so-called Interplanetary Transport Network. Such "fuzzy orbits" use significantly less energy than Hohmann transfers but are much, much slower. They aren't practical for human crewed missions because they generally take years or decades, but may be useful for high-volume transport of low-value commodities if humanity develops a space-based economy.

=== Aerobraking ===
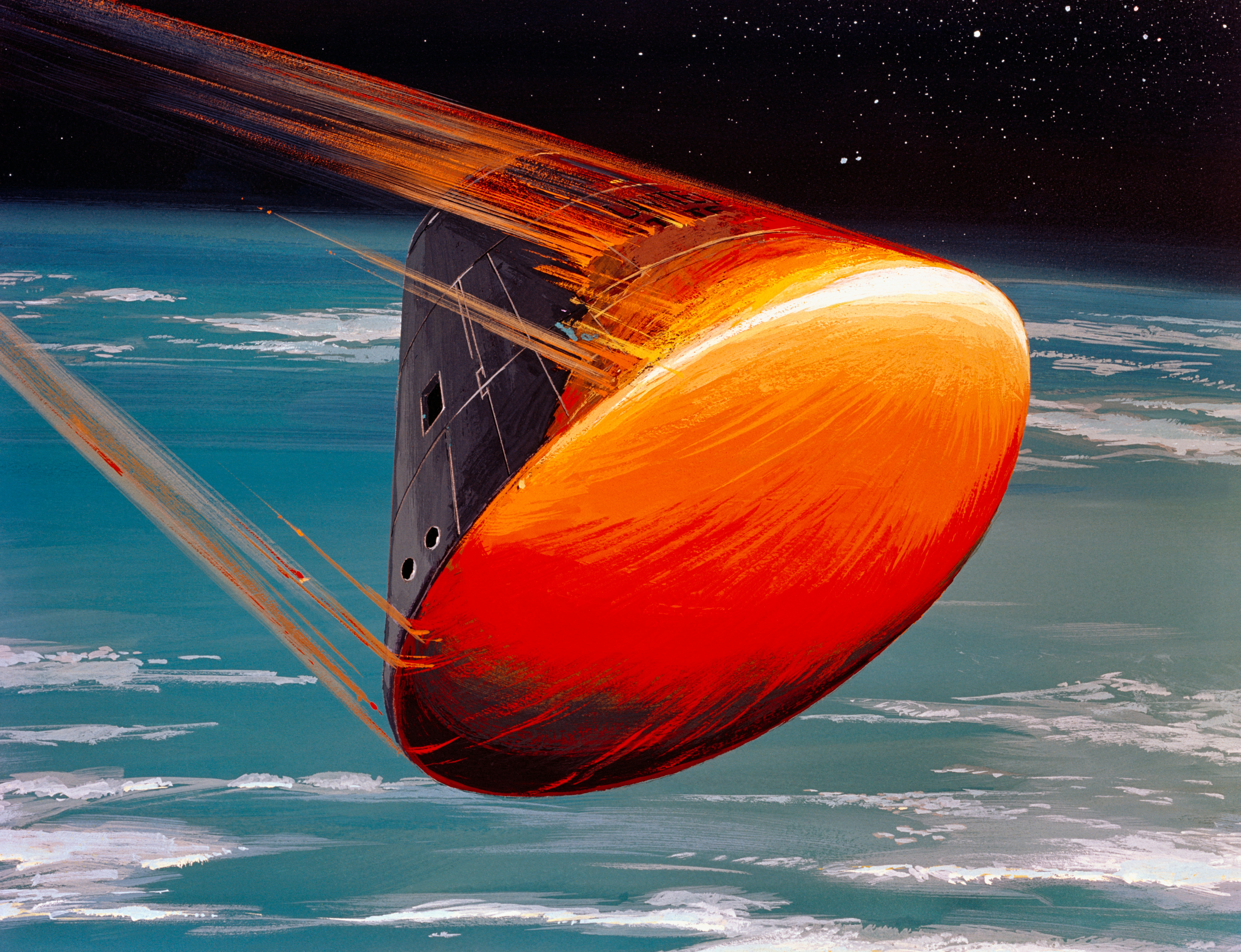
Artist's rendition of an Apollo Command Module aerobraking

Aerobraking uses the atmosphere of the target planet to slow down. It was first used on the Apollo program where the returning spacecraft did not enter Earth orbit but instead used a S-shaped vertical descent profile (starting with an initially steep descent, followed by a leveling out, followed by a slight climb, followed by a return to a positive rate of descent continuing to splash-down in the ocean) through Earth's atmosphere to reduce its speed until the parachute system could be deployed enabling a safe landing. Aerobraking does not require a thick atmosphere – for example most Mars landers use the technique, and Mars' atmosphere is only about 1% as thick as Earth's.

Aerobraking converts the spacecraft's kinetic energy into heat, so it requires a heatshield to prevent the craft from burning up. As a result, aerobraking is only helpful in cases where the fuel needed to transport the heatshield to the planet is less than the fuel that would be required to brake an unshielded craft by firing its engines. This can be addressed by creating heatshields from material available near the target.

== Improved technologies and methodologies ==
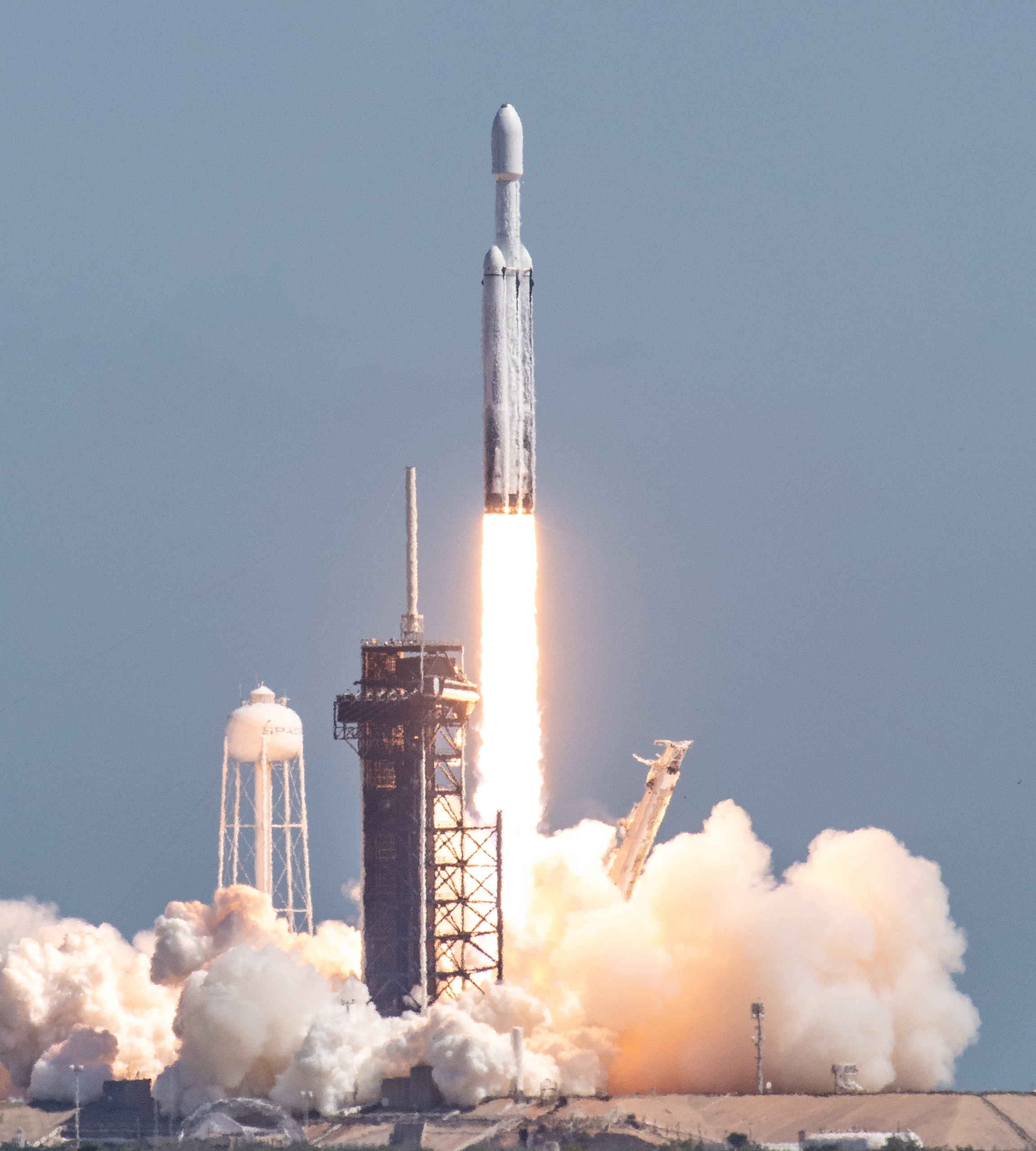
A Falcon Heavy rocket launches Europa Clipper into a trajectory to Jupiter; mission demands required all parts of the partially reusable launch vehicle to be expended.

Several technologies have been proposed which both save fuel and provide significantly faster travel than the traditional methodology of using Hohmann transfers. Some are still just theoretical, but over time, several of the theoretical approaches have been tested on spaceflight missions. For example, the Deep Space 1 mission was a successful test of an ion drive. These improved technologies typically focus on one or more of:

- Space propulsion systems with much better fuel economy. Such systems would make it possible to travel much faster while keeping the fuel cost within acceptable limits.
- Using solar energy and in-situ resource utilization to avoid or minimize the expensive task of shipping components and fuel up from the Earth's surface, against the Earth's gravity (see "Using non-terrestrial resources", below).
- Novel methodologies of using energy at different locations or in different ways that can shorten transport time or reduce cost per unit mass of space transport

Besides making travel faster or cost less, such improvements could also allow greater design "safety margins" by reducing the imperative to make spacecraft lighter.

=== Improved rocket concepts ===
All rocket concepts are limited by the Tsiolkovsky rocket equation, which sets the characteristic velocity available as a function of exhaust velocity and mass ratio, of initial (M_{0}, including fuel) to final (M_{1}, fuel depleted) mass. The main consequence is that mission velocities of more than a few times the velocity of the rocket motor exhaust (with respect to the vehicle) rapidly become impractical, as the dry mass (mass of payload and rocket without fuel) falls to below 10% of the entire rocket's wet mass (mass of rocket with fuel).

==== Nuclear thermal and solar thermal rockets ====
Sketch of nuclear thermal rocket

In a nuclear thermal rocket or solar thermal rocket a working fluid, usually hydrogen, is heated to a high temperature, and then expands through a rocket nozzle to create thrust. The energy replaces the chemical energy of the reactive chemicals in a traditional rocket engine. Due to the low molecular mass and hence high thermal velocity of hydrogen these engines are at least twice as fuel efficient as chemical engines, even after including the weight of the reactor.

The US Atomic Energy Commission and NASA tested a few designs from 1959 to 1968. The NASA designs were conceived as replacements for the upper stages of the Saturn V launch vehicle, but the tests revealed reliability problems, mainly caused by the vibration and heating involved in running the engines at such high thrust levels. Political and environmental considerations make it unlikely such an engine will be used in the foreseeable future, since nuclear thermal rockets would be most useful at or near the Earth's surface and the consequences of a malfunction could be disastrous. Fission-based thermal rocket concepts produce lower exhaust velocities than the electric and plasma concepts described below, and are therefore less attractive solutions. For applications requiring high thrust-to-weight ratio, such as planetary escape, nuclear thermal is potentially more attractive.

==== Electric propulsion ====
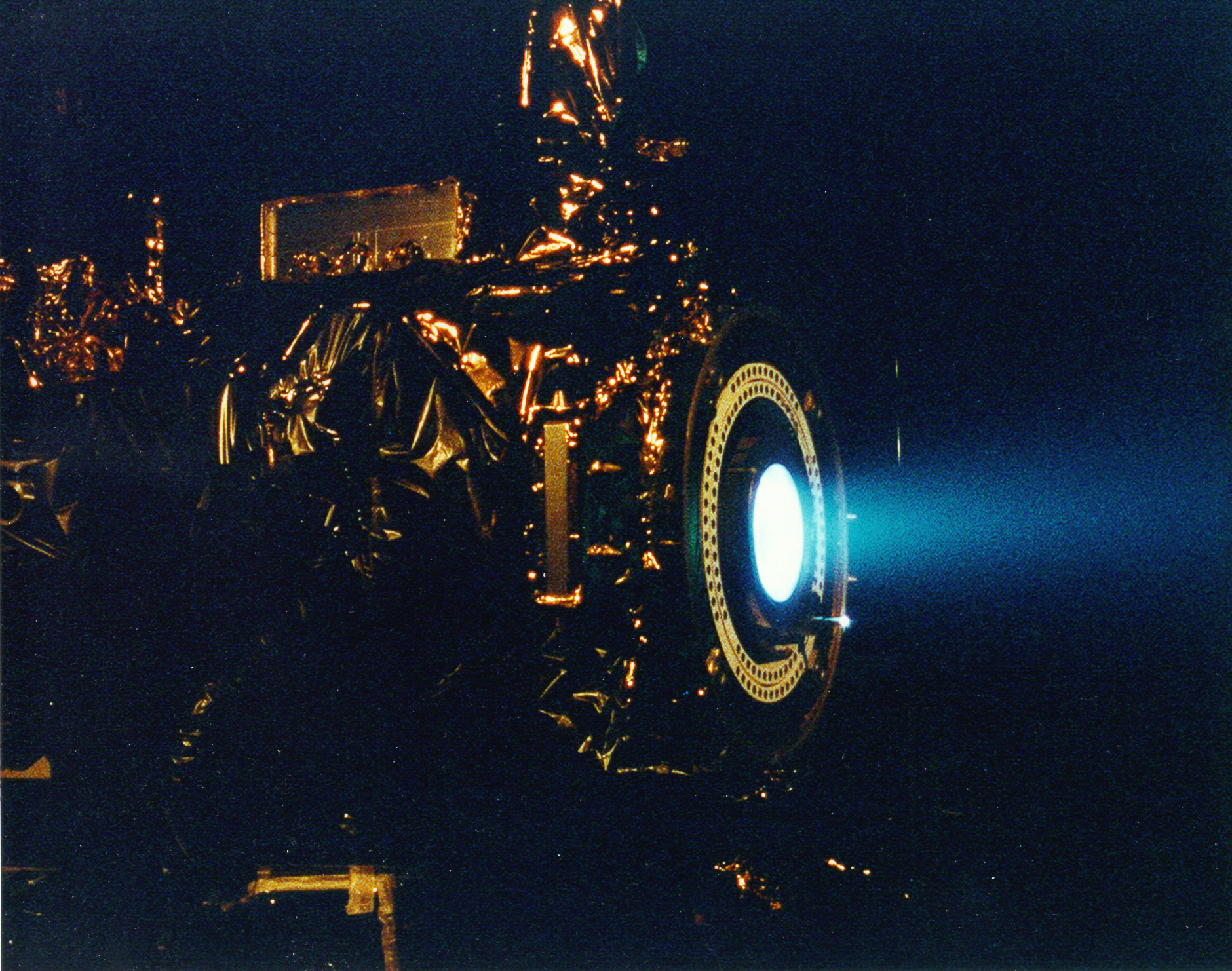
A xenon ion engine being tested at NASA's Jet Propulsion Laboratory, 1999

Electric propulsion systems use an external source such as a nuclear reactor or solar cells to generate electricity, which is then used to accelerate a chemically inert propellant to speeds far higher than achieved in a chemical rocket. Such drives produce feeble thrust, and are therefore unsuitable for quick maneuvers or for launching from the surface of a planet. But they are so economical in their use of working mass that they can keep firing continuously for days or weeks, while chemical rockets use up reaction mass so quickly that they can only fire for seconds or minutes. Even a trip to the Moon is long enough for an electric propulsion system to outrun a chemical rocket – the Apollo missions took 3 days in each direction.

NASA's Deep Space One was a very successful test of a prototype ion drive, which fired for a total of 678 days and enabled the probe to run down Comet Borrelly, a feat which would have been impossible for a chemical rocket. Dawn, the first NASA operational (i.e., non-technology demonstration) mission to use an ion drive for its primary propulsion, successfully orbited the large main-belt asteroids 1 Ceres and 4 Vesta. A more ambitious, nuclear-powered version was intended for a Jupiter mission without human crew, the Jupiter Icy Moons Orbiter (JIMO), originally planned for launch sometime in the next decade. Due to a shift in priorities at NASA that favored human crewed space missions, the project lost funding in 2005. A similar mission is currently under discussion as the US component of a joint NASA/ESA program for the exploration of Europa and Ganymede.

A NASA multi-center Technology Applications Assessment Team led from the Johnson Spaceflight Center, has as of January 2011 described "Nautilus-X", a concept study for a multi-mission space exploration vehicle useful for missions beyond low Earth orbit (LEO), of up to 24 months duration for a crew of up to six. Although Nautilus-X is adaptable to a variety of mission-specific propulsion units of various low-thrust, high specific impulse (I_{sp}) designs, nuclear ion-electric drive is shown for illustrative purposes. It is intended for integration and checkout at the International Space Station (ISS), and would be suitable for deep-space missions from the ISS to and beyond the Moon, including Earth/Moon L1, Sun/Earth L2, near-Earth asteroidal, and Mars orbital destinations. It incorporates a reduced-g centrifuge providing artificial gravity for crew health to ameliorate the effects of long-term 0g exposure, and the capability to mitigate the space radiation environment.

==== Fission powered rockets ====
The electric propulsion missions already flown, or currently scheduled, have used solar electric power, limiting their capability to operate far from the Sun, and also limiting their peak acceleration due to the mass of the electric power source. Nuclear-electric or plasma engines, operating for long periods at low thrust and powered by fission reactors, can reach speeds much greater than chemically powered vehicles.

==== Fusion rockets ====
Fusion rockets, powered by nuclear fusion reactions, would "burn" such light element fuels as deuterium, tritium, or ^{3}He. Because fusion yields about 1% of the mass of the nuclear fuel as released energy, it is energetically more favorable than fission, which releases only about 0.1% of the fuel's mass-energy. However, either fission or fusion technologies can in principle achieve velocities far higher than needed for Solar System exploration, and fusion energy still awaits practical demonstration on Earth.

One proposal using a fusion rocket was Project Daedalus. Another fairly detailed vehicle system, designed and optimized for crewed Solar System exploration, "Discovery II", based on the D^{3}He reaction but using hydrogen as reaction mass, has been described by a team from NASA's Glenn Research Center. It achieves characteristic velocities of >300 km/s with an acceleration of ~1.7•10^{−3} g, with a ship initial mass of ~1700 metric tons, and payload fraction above 10%.

Fusion rockets are considered to be a likely source of interplanetary transport for a planetary civilization.

==== Exotic propulsion ====
See the spacecraft propulsion article for a discussion of a number of other technologies that could, in the medium to longer term, be the basis of interplanetary missions. Unlike the situation with interstellar travel, the barriers to fast interplanetary travel involve engineering and economics rather than any basic physics.

=== Solar sails ===
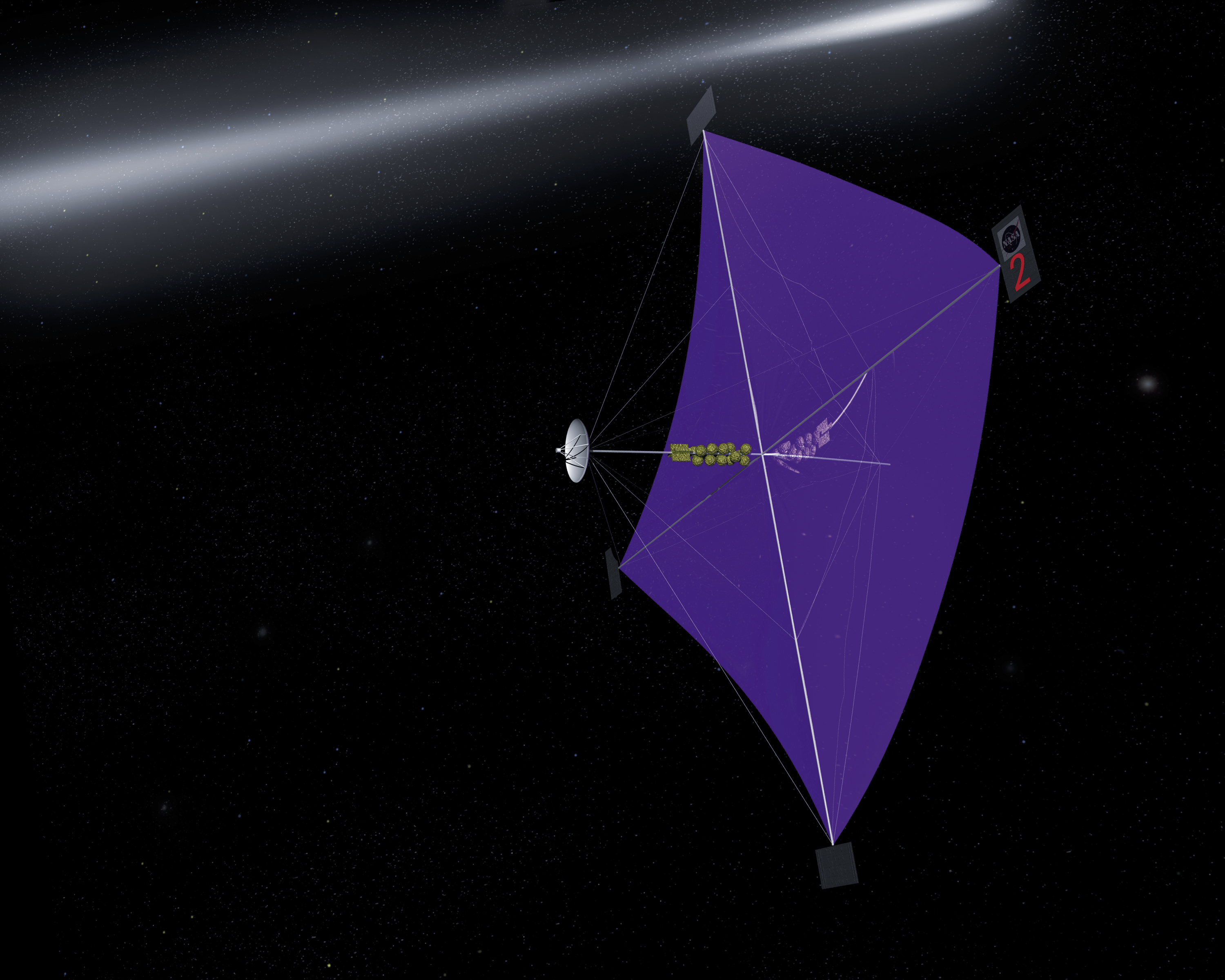
NASA illustration of a solar-sail propelled spacecraft

Solar sails rely on the fact that light reflected from a surface exerts pressure on the surface. The radiation pressure is small and decreases by the square of the distance from the Sun, but unlike rockets, solar sails require no fuel. Although the thrust is small, it continues as long as the Sun shines and the sail is deployed.

The original concept relied only on radiation from the Sun – for example in Arthur C. Clarke's 1965 story "Sunjammer". More recent light sail designs propose to boost the thrust by aiming ground-based lasers or masers at the sail. Ground-based lasers or masers can also help a light-sail spacecraft to decelerate: the sail splits into an outer and inner section, the outer section is pushed forward and its shape is changed mechanically to focus reflected radiation on the inner portion, and the radiation focused on the inner section acts as a brake.

Although most articles about light sails focus on interstellar travel, there have been several proposals for their use within the Solar System.

Currently, the only spacecraft to use a solar sail as the main method of propulsion is IKAROS which was launched by JAXA on May 21, 2010. It has since been successfully deployed, and shown to be producing acceleration as expected. Many ordinary spacecraft and satellites also use solar collectors, temperature-control panels and Sun shades as light sails, to make minor corrections to their attitude and orbit without using fuel. A few have even had small purpose-built solar sails for this use (for example Eurostar E3000 geostationary communications satellites built by EADS Astrium).

=== Cyclers ===
It is possible to put stations or spacecraft on orbits that cycle between different planets, for example a Mars cycler would synchronously cycle between Mars and Earth, with very little propellant usage to maintain the trajectory. Cyclers are conceptually a good idea, because massive radiation shields, life support and other equipment only need to be put onto the cycler trajectory once. A cycler could combine several roles: habitat (for example it could spin to produce an "artificial gravity" effect), or a mothership (providing life support for the crews of smaller spacecraft which hitch a ride on it). Cyclers could also possibly make excellent cargo ships for resupply of a colony.

=== Space elevator ===
A space elevator is a theoretical structure that would transport material from a planet's surface into orbit. The idea is that, once the expensive job of building the elevator is complete, an indefinite number of loads can be transported into orbit at minimal cost. Even the simplest designs avoid the vicious circle of rocket launches from the surface, wherein the fuel needed to travel the last 10% of the distance into orbit must be lifted all the way from the surface, requiring even more fuel, and so on. More sophisticated space elevator designs reduce the energy cost per trip by using counterweights, and the most ambitious schemes aim to balance loads going up and down and thus make the energy cost close to zero. Space elevators have also sometimes been referred to as "beanstalks", "space bridges", "space lifts", "space ladders" and "orbital towers".

A terrestrial space elevator is beyond our current technology, although a lunar space elevator could theoretically be built using existing materials.

=== Skyhook ===
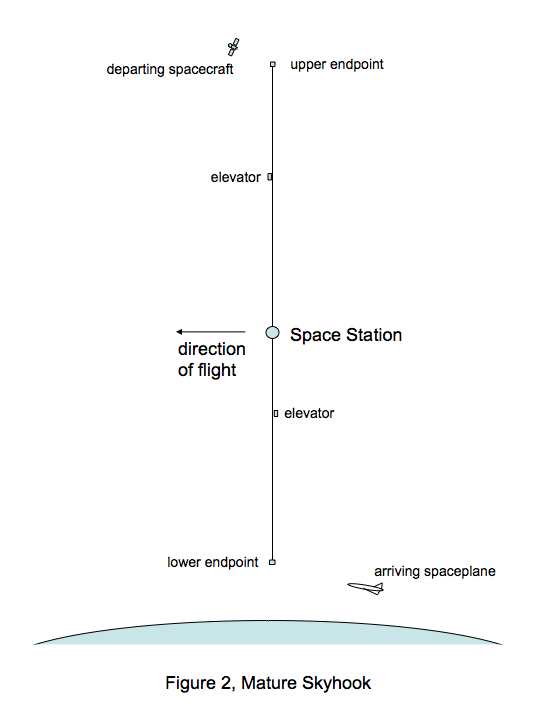
Non-rotating skyhook first proposed by E. Sarmont in 1990

A skyhook is a theoretical class of orbiting tether propulsion intended to lift payloads to high altitudes and speeds. Proposals for skyhooks include designs that employ tethers spinning at hypersonic speed for catching high speed payloads or high altitude aircraft and placing them in orbit. In addition, it has been suggested that the rotating skyhook is "not engineeringly feasible using presently available materials".

=== Launch vehicle and spacecraft reusability ===
The SpaceX Starship is designed to be fully and rapidly reusable, making use of the SpaceX reusable technology that was developed during 2011–2018 for Falcon 9 and Falcon Heavy launch vehicles.

SpaceX CEO Elon Musk estimates that the reusability capability alone, on both the launch vehicle and the spacecraft associated with the Starship will reduce overall system costs per tonne delivered to Mars by at least two orders of magnitude over what NASA had previously achieved.

=== Staging propellants ===
When launching interplanetary probes from the surface of Earth, carrying all energy needed for the long-duration mission, payload quantities are necessarily extremely limited, due to the basis mass limitations described theoretically by the rocket equation. One alternative to transport more mass on interplanetary trajectories is to use up nearly all of the upper stage propellant on launch, and then refill propellants in Earth orbit before firing the rocket to escape velocity for a heliocentric trajectory. These propellants could be stored on orbit at a propellant depot, or carried to orbit in a propellant tanker to be directly transferred to the interplanetary spacecraft. For returning mass to Earth, a related option is to mine raw materials from a solar system celestial object, refine, process, and store the reaction products (propellant) on the Solar System body until such time as a vehicle needs to be loaded for launch.

==== On-orbit tanker transfers ====
As of 2019, SpaceX is developing a system in which a reusable first stage vehicle would transport a crewed interplanetary spacecraft to Earth orbit, detach, return to its launch pad where a tanker spacecraft would be mounted atop it, then both fueled, then launched again to rendezvous with the waiting crewed spacecraft. The tanker would then transfer its fuel to the human crewed spacecraft for use on its interplanetary voyage. The SpaceX Starship is a stainless steel-structure spacecraft propelled by six Raptor engines operating on densified methane/oxygen propellants. It is 55 m (180 ft)-long, 9 m (30 ft)-diameter at its widest point, and is capable of transporting up to 100 tonnes (220,000 lb) of cargo and passengers per trip to Mars, with on-orbit propellant refill before the interplanetary part of the journey.

==== Propellant plant on a celestial body ====
As an example of a funded project currently under development, a key part of the system SpaceX has designed for Mars in order to radically decrease the cost of spaceflight to interplanetary destinations is the placement and operation of a physical plant on Mars to handle production and storage of the propellant components necessary to launch and fly the Starships back to Earth, or perhaps to increase the mass that can be transported onward to destinations in the outer Solar System.

The first Starship to Mars will carry a small propellant plant as a part of its cargo load. The plant will be expanded over multiple synods as more equipment arrives, is installed, and placed into mostly-autonomous production.

The SpaceX propellant plant will take advantage of the large supplies of carbon dioxide and water resources on Mars, mining the water (H_{2}O) from subsurface ice and collecting CO_{2} from the atmosphere. A chemical plant will process the raw materials by means of electrolysis and the Sabatier process to produce oxygen (O_{2}) and methane (CH_{4}), and then liquefy it to facilitate long-term storage and ultimate use.

=== Using extraterrestrial resources ===
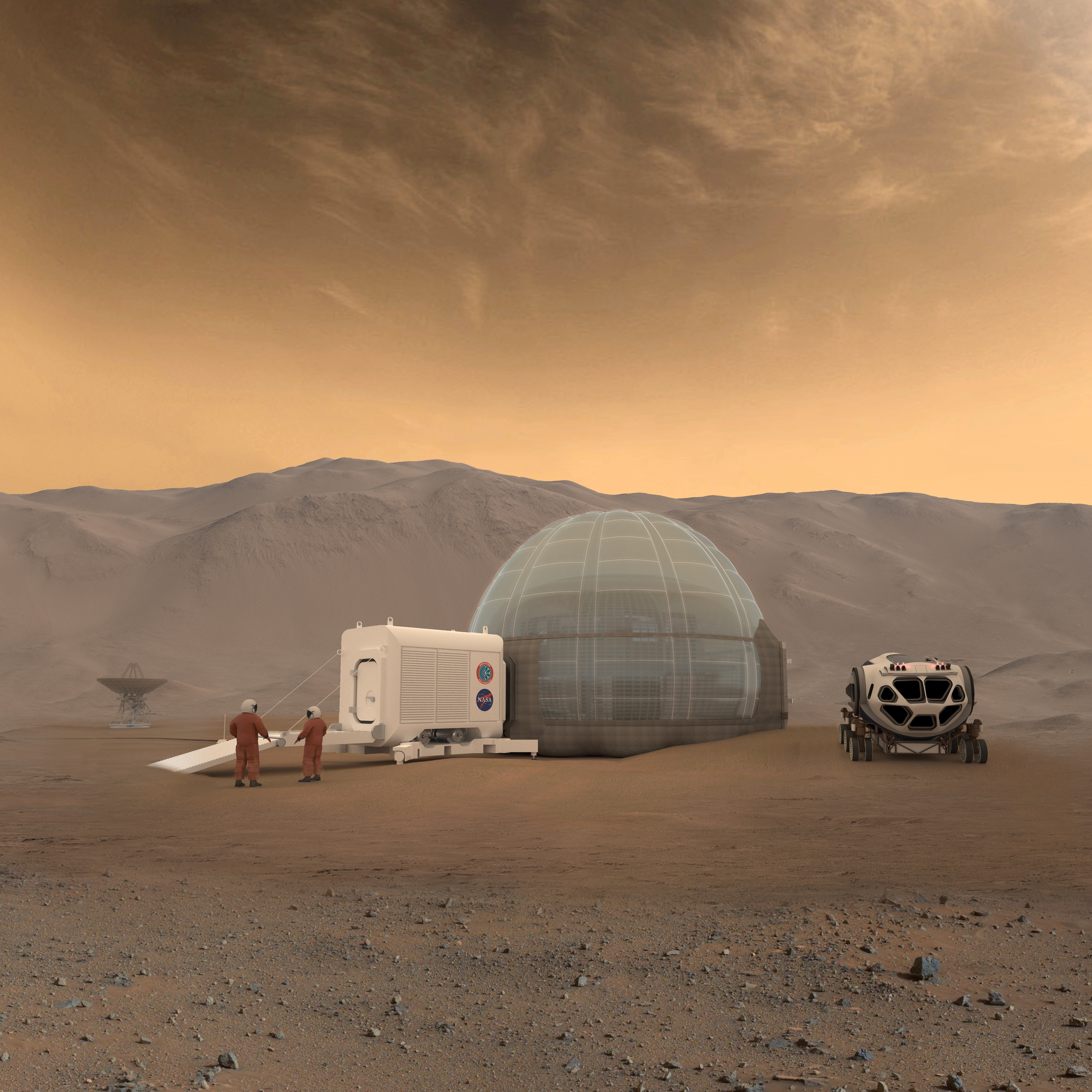
Langley's Mars Ice Dome design from 2016 for a Mars base would use in-situ water to make a sort of space-igloo.

Current space vehicles attempt to launch with all their fuel (propellants and energy supplies) on board that they will need for their entire journey, and current space structures are lifted from the Earth's surface. Non-terrestrial sources of energy and materials are mostly a lot further away, but most would not require lifting out of a strong gravity field and therefore should be much cheaper to use in space in the long term.

The most important non-terrestrial resource is energy, because it can be used to transform non-terrestrial materials into useful forms (some of which may also produce energy). At least two fundamental non-terrestrial energy sources have been proposed: solar-powered energy generation (unhampered by clouds), either directly by solar cells or indirectly by focusing solar radiation on boilers which produce steam to drive generators; and electrodynamic tethers which generate electricity from the powerful magnetic fields of some planets (Jupiter has a very powerful magnetic field).

Water ice would be very useful and is widespread on the moons of Jupiter and Saturn:

- The low gravity of these moons would make them a cheaper source of water for space stations and planetary bases than lifting it up from Earth's surface.
- Non-terrestrial power supplies could be used to electrolyse water ice into oxygen and hydrogen for use in bipropellant rocket engines.
- Nuclear thermal rockets or Solar thermal rockets could use it as reaction mass. Hydrogen has also been proposed for use in these engines and would provide much greater specific impulse (thrust per kilogram of reaction mass), but it has been claimed that water will beat hydrogen in cost/performance terms despite its much lower specific impulse by orders of magnitude.
- A spacecraft with an adequate water supply could carry the water under the hull, which could provide a considerable additional safety margin for the vessel and its occupants:
  - The water would absorb and conduct solar energy, thus acting as a heat shield. A vessel traveling in the inner Solar System could maintain a constant heading relative to the Sun without overheating the side of the spacecraft facing the Sun, provided the water under the hull was constantly circulated to evenly distribute the solar heat throughout the hull;
  - The water would provide some additional protection against ionizing radiation;
  - The water would act as an insulator against the extreme cold assuming it was kept heated, whether by the Sun when traveling in the inner Solar System or by an on board power source when traveling further away from the Sun;
  - The water would provide some additional protection against micrometeoroid impacts, provided the hull was compartmentalized so as to ensure any leak could be isolated to a small section of the hull.

Oxygen is a common constituent of the Moon's crust, and is probably abundant in most other bodies in the Solar System. Non-terrestrial oxygen would be valuable as a source of water ice only if an adequate source of hydrogen can be found. Possible uses include:

- In the life support systems of space ships, space stations and planetary bases.
- In rocket engines. Even if the other propellant has to be lifted from Earth, using non-terrestrial oxygen could reduce propellant launch costs by up to 2/3 for hydrocarbon fuel, or 85% for hydrogen. The savings are so high because oxygen accounts for the majority of the mass in most rocket propellant combinations.

Unfortunately hydrogen, along with other volatiles like carbon and nitrogen, are much less abundant than oxygen in the inner Solar System.

Scientists expect to find a vast range of organic compounds in some of the planets, moons and comets of the outer Solar System, and the range of possible uses is even wider. For example, methane can be used as a fuel (burned with non-terrestrial oxygen), or as a feedstock for petrochemical processes such as making plastics. And ammonia could be a valuable feedstock for producing fertilizers to be used in the vegetable gardens of orbital and planetary bases, reducing the need to lift food to them from Earth.

Even unprocessed rock may be useful as rocket propellant if mass drivers are employed.

== Design requirements for crewed interplanetary travel ==
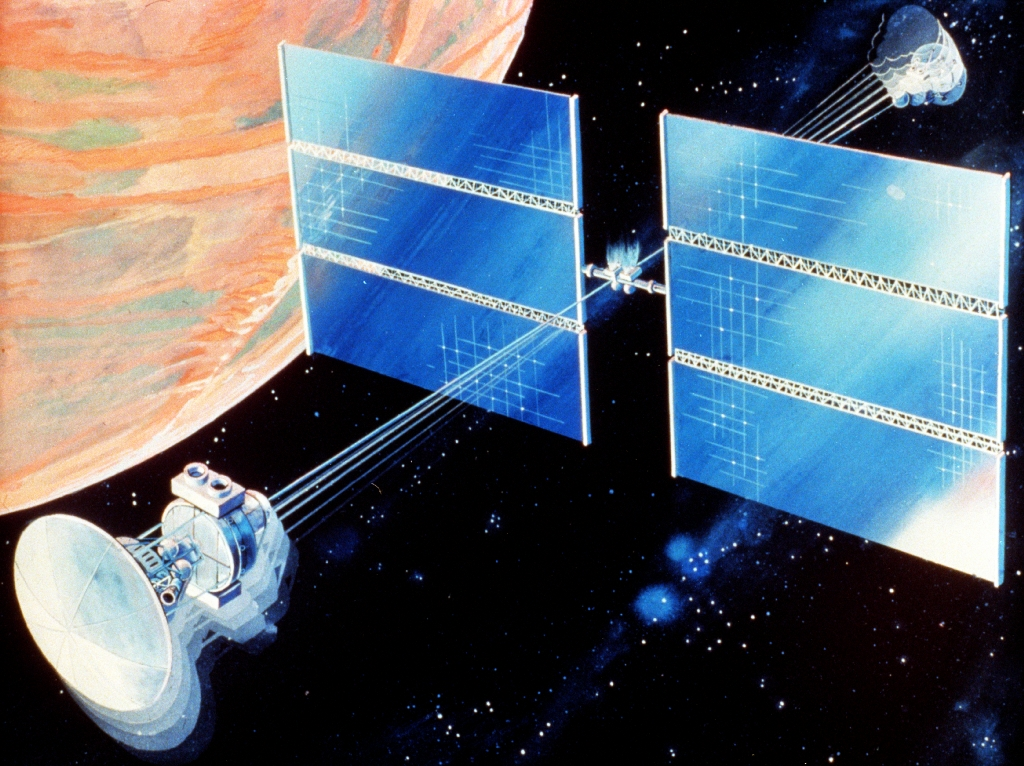
In the artistic vision, the spacecraft provides artificial gravity by spinning (1989).

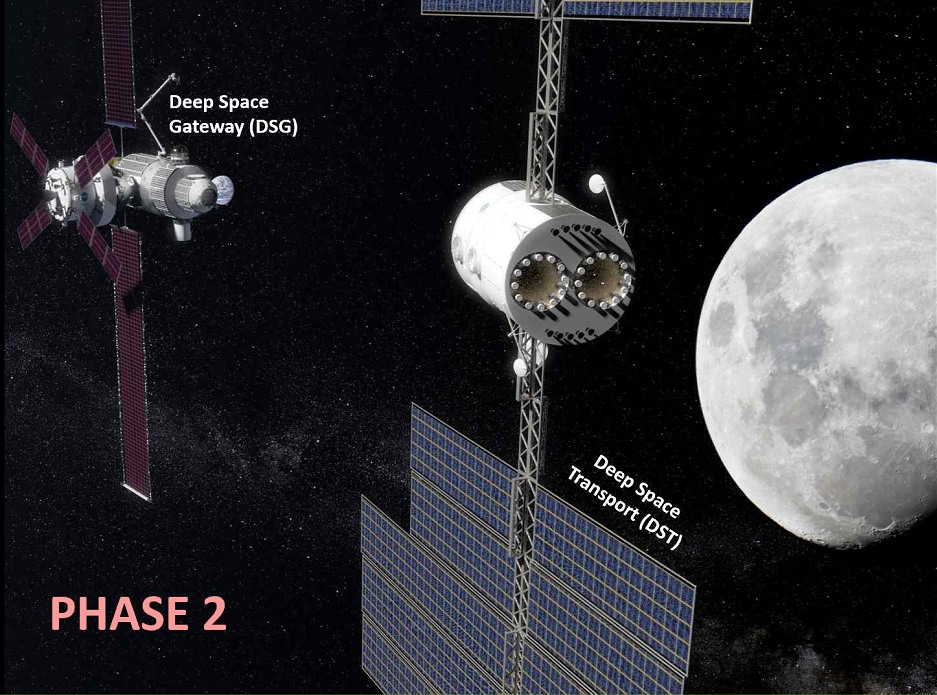
Deep Space Transport and Lunar Gateway

=== Life support ===
Life support systems must be capable of supporting human life for weeks, months or even years. A breathable atmosphere of at least 35 kPa (5.1 psi) must be maintained, with adequate amounts of oxygen, nitrogen, and controlled levels of carbon dioxide, trace gases and water vapor.

In October 2015, the NASA Office of Inspector General issued a health hazards report related to human spaceflight, including a human mission to Mars.

=== Radiation ===
Once a vehicle leaves low Earth orbit and the protection of Earth's magnetosphere, it enters the Van Allen radiation belt, a region of high radiation. Beyond the Van Allen belts, radiation levels generally decrease, but can fluctuate over time. These high energy cosmic rays pose a health threat. Even the minimum levels of radiation during these fluctuations is comparable to the current annual limit for astronauts in low-Earth orbit.

Scientists of Russian Academy of Sciences are searching for methods of reducing the risk of radiation-induced cancer in preparation for the mission to Mars. They consider as one of the options a life support system generating drinking water with low content of deuterium (a stable isotope of hydrogen) to be consumed by the crew members. Preliminary investigations have shown that deuterium-depleted water features certain anti-cancer effects. Hence, deuterium-free drinking water is considered to have the potential of lowering the risk of cancer caused by extreme radiation exposure of the Martian crew.

In addition, coronal mass ejections from the Sun are highly dangerous, and are fatal within a very short timescale to humans unless they are protected by massive shielding.

=== Reliability ===
Any major failure to a spacecraft en route is likely to be fatal, and even a minor one could have dangerous results if not repaired quickly, something difficult to accomplish in open space. The crew of the Apollo 13 mission survived despite an explosion caused by a faulty oxygen tank (1970).

=== Launch windows ===
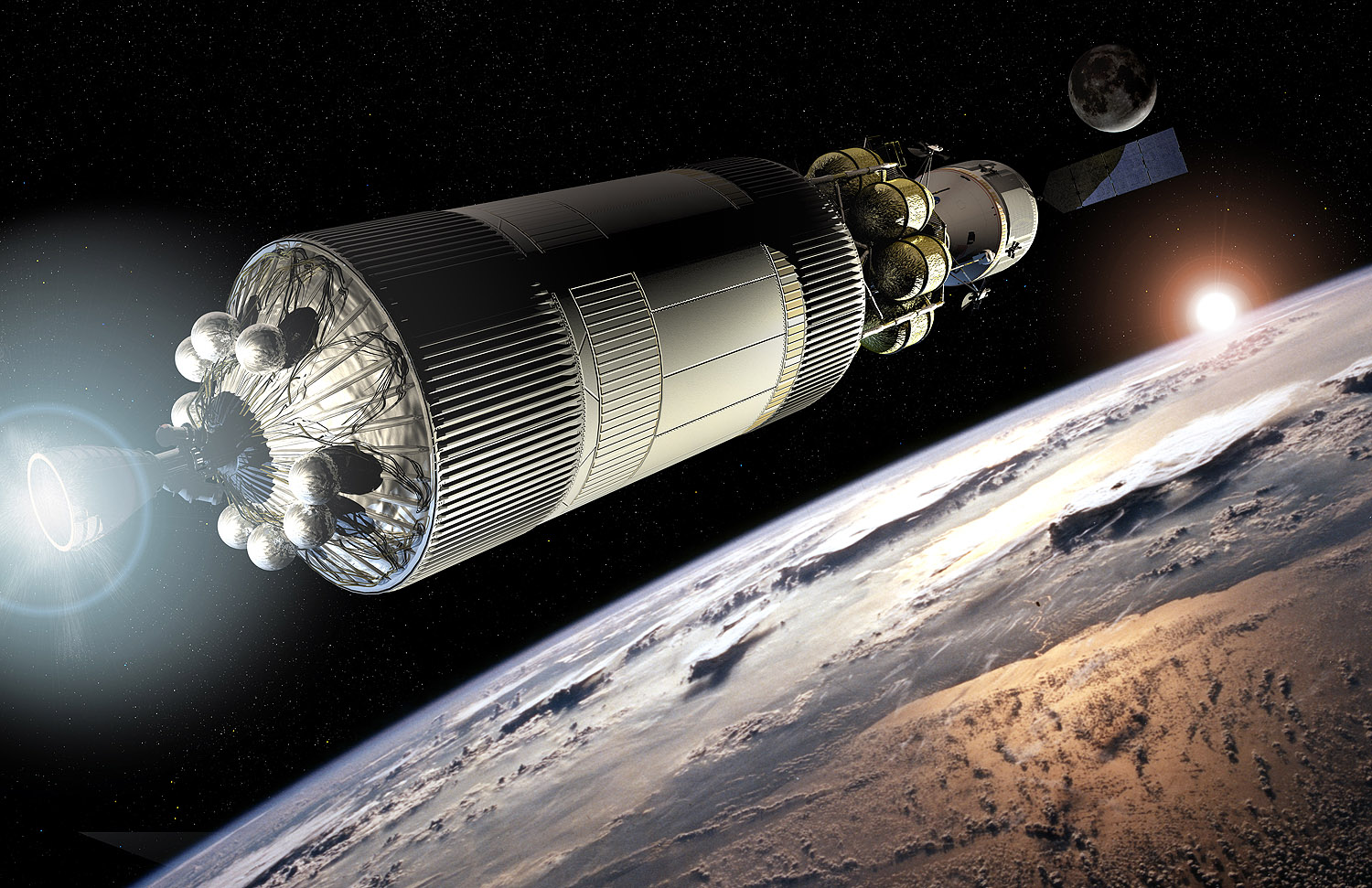
Earth Departure Stage

For astrodynamics reasons, economic spacecraft travel to other planets is only practical within certain time windows. Outside these windows the planets are essentially inaccessible from Earth with current technology. This constrains flights and limits rescue options in the case of an emergency.

In 2021, the National Academies of Sciences, Engineering, and Medicine (NASEM) evaluated NASA's proposed universal career radiation exposure limit. The recommendations established a unified career limit of 600 millisieverts (mSv) across all astronaut cohorts (regardless of age or biological sex), configured to keep the excess risk of radiation-induced cancer mortality below 3% at a 95% confidence level.National Academies Press: Space Radiation and Astronaut Health: Managing Risks for Planetary Exploration (2021)

== See also ==
- Delta-v – Measure of amount of effort to change trajectory
- Effect of spaceflight on the human body – Medical issues associated with spaceflight
- Health threat from cosmic rays – Cancer causing exposure to ionizing radiation in spaceflight
- Human spaceflight – Spaceflight with a crew or passengers
- SpaceX Starship – Reusable superheavy-lift general-purpose launch vehicle under development
- Interstellar travel – Hypothetical travel between stars or planetary systems
- List of interplanetary voyages
- Human mission to Mars – Proposed concepts
- Space medicine – Application of medicine during spaceflight
- Space travel in science fiction
- Spacecraft propulsion – Method used to accelerate spacecraft
