= Interplanetary Transport Network =

Low-energy trajectories in the Solar System

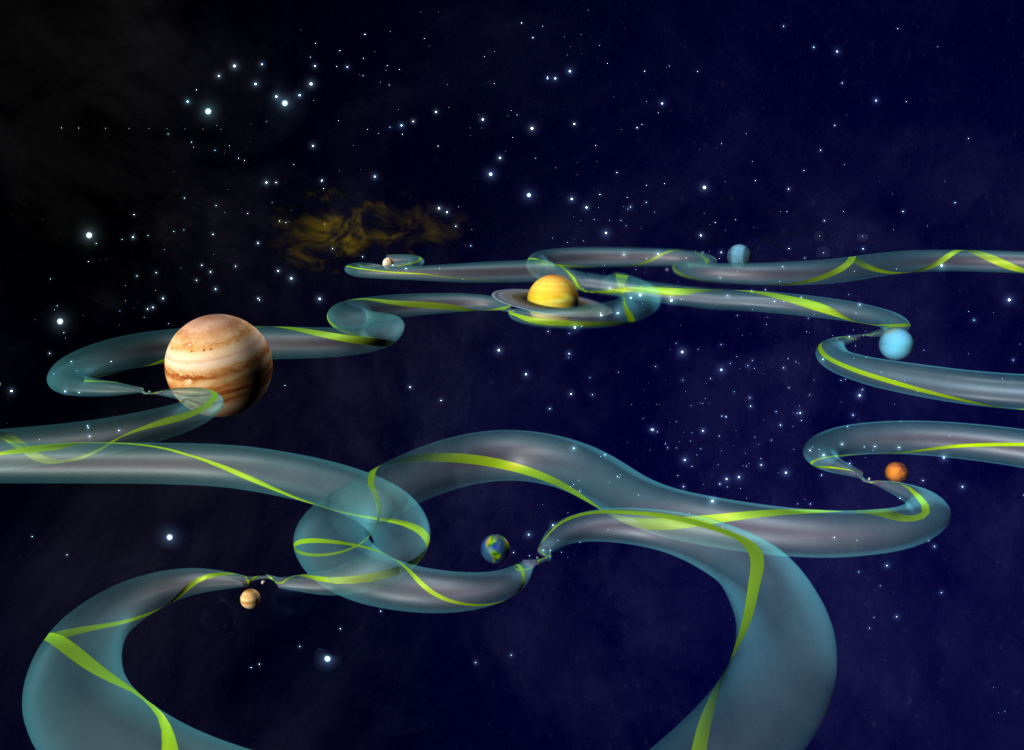
This stylized depiction of the ITN is designed to show its (often convoluted) path through the Solar System. The green ribbon represents one path from among the many that are mathematically possible along the surface of the darker green bounding tube. Locations where the ribbon changes direction abruptly represent trajectory changes at Lagrange points, while constricted areas represent locations where objects linger in temporary orbit around a point before continuing on.

The Interplanetary Transport Network (ITN) is a collection of gravitationally determined pathways through the Solar System that require very little energy for an object to follow. The ITN makes particular use of Lagrange points as locations where trajectories through space can be redirected using little or no energy. These points have the peculiar property of allowing objects to orbit around them, despite lacking an object to orbit, as these points exist where gravitational forces between two celestial bodies are equal. While it would use little energy, transport along the network would take a long time.

== History ==
Interplanetary transfer orbits are solutions to the gravitational three-body problem, which, for the general case, does not have analytical solutions, and is addressed by numerical analysis approximations. However, a small number of exact solutions exist, most notably the five orbits referred to as "Lagrange points", which are orbital solutions for circular orbits in the case when one body is significantly more massive.

The key to discovering the Interplanetary Transport Network was the investigation of the nature of the winding paths near the Earth-Sun and Earth-Moon Lagrange points. They were first investigated by Henri Poincaré in the 1890s. He noticed that the paths leading to and from any of those points would almost always settle, for a time, on an orbit about that point. There are in fact an infinite number of paths taking one to the point and away from it, and all of which require nearly zero change in energy to reach. When plotted, they form a tube with the orbit about the Lagrange point at one end.

The derivation of these paths traces back to mathematicians Charles C. Conley and Richard P. McGehee in 1968. Hiten, Japan's first lunar probe, was moved into lunar orbit using similar insight into the nature of paths between the Earth and the Moon. Beginning in 1997, Martin Lo, Shane D. Ross, and others wrote a series of papers identifying the mathematical basis that applied the technique to the Genesis solar wind sample return, and to lunar and Jovian missions. They referred to it as an Interplanetary Superhighway (IPS).

== Paths ==
As it turns out, it is very easy to transit from a path leading to the point to one leading back out. This makes sense, since the orbit is unstable, which implies one will eventually end up on one of the outbound paths after spending no energy at all. Edward Belbruno coined the term "weak stability boundary" or "fuzzy boundary" for this effect.

With careful calculation, one can pick which outbound path one wants. This turns out to be useful, as many of these paths lead to some interesting points in space, such as the Earth's Moon or between the Galilean moons of Jupiter, within a few months or years.

For trips from Earth to other planets, they are not useful for crewed or uncrewed probes, as the trip would take many generations. Nevertheless, they have already been used to transfer spacecraft to the Earth–Sun L_{1} point, a useful point for studying the Sun that was employed in a number of recent missions, including the Genesis mission, the first to return solar wind samples to Earth. The network is also relevant to understanding Solar System dynamics; Comet Shoemaker–Levy 9 followed such a trajectory on its collision path with Jupiter.

=== Further explanation ===
The ITN is based around a series of orbital paths predicted by chaos theory and the restricted three-body problem leading to and from the orbits around the Lagrange points – points in space where the gravity between various bodies balances with the centrifugal force of an object there. For any two bodies in which one body orbits around the other, such as a star/planet or planet/moon system, there are five such points, denoted L_{1} through L_{5}. For instance, the Earth–Moon L_{1} point lies on a line between the two, where gravitational forces between them exactly balance with the centrifugal force of an object placed in orbit there. These five points have particularly low delta-v requirements, and appear to be the lowest-energy transfers possible, even lower than the common Hohmann transfer orbit that has dominated orbital navigation since the start of space travel.

Although the forces balance at these points, the first three points (the ones on the line between a certain large mass, e.g. a star, and a smaller, orbiting mass, e.g. a planet) are not stable equilibrium points. If a spacecraft placed at the Earth–Moon L_{1} point is given even a slight nudge away from the equilibrium point, the spacecraft's trajectory will diverge away from the L_{1} point. The entire system is in motion, so the spacecraft will not actually hit the Moon, but will travel in a winding path, off into space. There is, however, a semi-stable orbit around each of these points, called a halo orbit. The orbits for two of the points, L_{4} and L_{5}, are stable, but the halo orbits for L_{1} through L_{3} are stable only on the order of months.

In addition to orbits around Lagrange points, the rich dynamics that arise from the gravitational pull of more than one mass yield interesting trajectories, also known as low energy transfers. For example, the gravity environment of the Sun–Earth–Moon system allows spacecraft to travel great distances on very little fuel, albeit on an often circuitous route.

== Missions ==
Launched in 1978, the ISEE-3 spacecraft was sent on a mission to orbit around one of the Lagrange points. The spacecraft was able to maneuver around the Earth's neighborhood using little fuel by taking advantage of the unique gravity environment. After the primary mission was completed, ISEE-3 went on to accomplish other goals, including a flight through the geomagnetic tail and a comet flyby. The mission was subsequently renamed the International Cometary Explorer (ICE).

The first low energy transfer using what would later be called the ITN was the rescue of Japan's Hiten lunar mission in 1991.

Another example of the use of the ITN was NASA's 2001–2003 Genesis mission, which orbited the Sun–Earth L_{1} point for over two years collecting material, before being redirected to the L_{2} Lagrange point, and finally redirected from there back to Earth.

The 2003–2006 SMART-1 of the European Space Agency used another low energy transfer from the ITN.

In a more recent example, the Chinese spacecraft Chang'e 2 used the ITN to travel from lunar orbit to the Earth-Sun L_{2} point, then on to fly by the asteroid 4179 Toutatis.

== Asteroids ==
The asteroid 39P/Oterma's path from outside Jupiter's orbit, to inside, and back to outside is said to follow these low energy paths.

== See also ==
- Grand Tour program, a NASA initiative to use a 175 years planet alignment that would eventually become the Voyager program
- Gravitational keyhole – Region of planetary space resulting in a future collision if traversed by an asteroid
- Gravity assist – Space navigation technique
- Halo orbit – Periodic, three-dimensional orbit
- Hill sphere – Region in which an astronomical body dominates the attraction of satellites
- Horseshoe orbit – Type of co-orbital motion of a small orbiting body relative to a larger orbiting body
- Interplanetary spaceflight – Crewed or uncrewed travel between stars or planets
- Invariant manifold – Topological manifold that is invariant under the action of dynamical system
- Lunar cycler – Type of orbit which passes close to the Earth and Moon
- Mars cycler – Spacecraft trajectory that encounters Earth and Mars regularly
- Fermi Explorer – Proposed interstellar mission
- Orbital mechanics – Field of classical mechanics concerned with the motion of spacecraft
