= PAS-22 =

PanAmSat communications satellite

AsiaSat 3 → HGS-1 → PAS-22
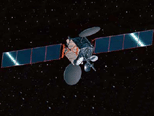
- Names: AsiaSat 3 HGS-1; PAS-22
- Mission type: Communications
- Operator: AsiaSat (1997–1998); Hughes (1998–1999); PanAmSat (1999–2002)
- COSPAR ID: 1997-086A
- SATCAT no.: 25126
- Mission duration: 15 years (planned); 4 years (achieved)

Spacecraft properties
- Spacecraft: AsiaSat 3
- Spacecraft type: Boeing 601
- Bus: HS-601HP
- Manufacturer: Hughes Space and Communications
- Launch mass: 3,465 kg
- Dry mass: 2,500 kg (5,500 lb)
- Dimensions: 3.4 m x 3.5 m x 5.8 m Span: 26.2 m on orbit
- Power: 9.9 kW

Start of mission
- Launch date: 24 December 1997, 23:19:00 UTC
- Rocket: Proton-K / DM-2M
- Launch site: Baikonur, Site 81/23
- Contractor: Khrunichev State Research and Production Space Center
- Entered service: July 1998

End of mission
- Disposal: Graveyard orbit
- Deactivated: July 2002

Orbital parameters
- Reference system: Geocentric orbit
- Regime: Geostationary orbit
- Longitude: 105.5° East (intended); 158° West (1998-1999); 62° West (1999–2002)

Flyby of Moon
- Closest approach: 13 May 1998, 19:00 UTC
- Distance: 6,200 km (3,900 mi)

Flyby of Moon
- Closest approach: 6 June 1998, 16:30 UTC
- Distance: 34,300 km (21,300 mi)

Transponders
- Band: 44 transponders: 28 C-band; 16 Ku-band
- Coverage area: Asia

AsiaSat 3, previously known as HGS-1 and then PAS-22, was a geosynchronous communications satellite, which was salvaged from an unusable geosynchronous transfer orbit (GTO) by means of the Moon's gravity.

== Launch of AsiaSat 3 ==
AsiaSat 3 was launched for AsiaSat of Hong Kong to provide communications and television services in Asia by a Proton-K / DM-2M launch vehicle on 24 December 1997, destined for an orbital position at 105.5° East. However, a failure of the Blok DM-2M fourth stage left it stranded in a highly inclined (51.6°) and elliptical orbit, although still fully functional. It was declared a total loss by its insurers.

== HGS-1 ==
Animation of AsiaSat 3 / HGS-1 trajectory around Earth from 24 December 1997 to 30 June 1998 AsiaSat 3 / HGS-1 Moon Earth

The satellite was transferred to Hughes Global Services Inc., which was then a subsidiary of Hughes Space and Communications, with an agreement to share any profits with the consortium of 27 insurers.

Edward Belbruno and Rex Ridenoure heard about the problem and proposed a 3–5 month low-energy transfer trajectory that would swing past the Moon and leave the satellite in geostationary orbit around the Earth. Hughes had no ability to track the satellite at such a distance and considered this trajectory concept unworkable. Instead, Hughes used an Apollo-style free-return trajectory that required only a few days to complete, a trajectory designed and subsequently patented by Hughes Chief Technologist Jerry Salvatore. This maneuver removed only 40° of orbital inclination and left the satellite in a geosynchronous orbit, whereas the Belbruno maneuver would have removed all 51° of inclination and left it in geostationary orbit.

Although Hughes did not end up using the low-energy transfer trajectory, the insight to use a lunar swingby was key to the spacecraft rescue. According to Cesar Ocampo, Hughes had not considered this option until it was contacted by Ridenoure, although the Hughes engineers involved in the lunar flyby operations have stated that they were already working on the lunar swingby mission design before being contacted by him.

=== Rescue of satellite ===
Using on-board propellant and lunar gravity, the orbit's apogee was gradually increased with several manoeuvres at perigee until it flew by the Moon at a distance of 6,200 km from its surface in May 1998, becoming in a sense the first commercial lunar spacecraft. Another lunar fly-by was performed later that month (6 June 1998) at a distance of 34,300 km to further improve the orbital inclination.

These operations consumed most of the satellite's propellant, but still much less than it would take to remove the inclination without the Moon-assist manoeuvres. With the remaining fuel, the satellite could be controlled as a geosynchronous satellite, with half the life of a normal satellite – a huge gain, considering that it had been declared a total loss. The satellite was then maneuvered to geosynchronous orbit at 158° West.

Once the satellite was in a stable orbit, it was commanded to release its solar panels, which had been stowed during takeoff and maneuvering. Of the satellite's two solar panels, only one released, and it became apparent that a tether was not operating correctly on board, which engineers attributed to heating and cooling cycles due to the satellite operating outside its design range while traveling to its final orbit.

== PAS-22 ==
In April 1999, Hughes filled to request authorization to operate the satellite at 60° West in C-band and in Ku-band. In 1999, HGS-1 was acquired by PanAmSat, and renamed as PAS-22, and moved to 60° West. It was deactivated in July 2002 and moved to a graveyard orbit.

== See also ==
- AMC-14
