= Martin Lo =

American mathematician

- Education: California Institute of Technology (BS, 1975); Cornell University (PhD, 1980)
- Known for: Interplanetary Transport Network
- Scientific career
- Fields: Mathematics, astrodynamics
- Workplaces: Jet Propulsion Laboratory
- Doctoral advisor: Richard S. Hamilton; George Roger Livesay

Martin Lo

Martin Wen-Yu Lo is an American mathematician who works as a spacecraft trajectory expert at the NASA/Caltech Jet Propulsion Laboratory. Lo is well known for discovering the Interplanetary Superhighway, also known as the Interplanetary Transport Network. The superhighway is created by combined gravitational forces of several planets that connects planets by a network of “tunnels” and is the most efficient way to navigate the Solar System. This continues to be his main area of research.

== Biography ==
Lo received his Bachelor of Science in mathematics in 1975 from the California Institute of Technology and his PhD in mathematics in 1980 from Cornell University under the supervision of Richard S. Hamilton and George Roger Livesay.

He has been a research scientist in the Navigation and Mission Design Section at the JPL since 1986.

In 2000, Lo, Kathleen Howell, and other scientists from the JPL developed the LTool program to calculate paths near Lagrange points (ITN paths). Compared with previous methods, LTool is capable of predicting orbits up to 50 times faster. They used this tool to calculate the trajectory for the Genesis mission (2001, NASA) trajectory, which took days rather than 8 weeks. The trajectory makes use of gravitational tugs of objects in the way of the spacecraft, ensuring minimal fuel use on the return journey. They called this trajectory the Interplanetary Superhighway. He also designed the trajectory for SpaceDev's SmallTug. LTool was nominated for the Discover Innovation Award. He is the leader of the Lagrange Group, which is an interdisciplinary and international group of researchers and STEM experts from universities, NASA centers, and industry. Their focus is on developing nonlinear astrodynamics techniques with applications to space missions and dynamical astronomy.

Lo appeared in Werner Herzog's film The Wild Blue Yonder in 2005.

== Awards and recognition ==
Martin was awarded the NOGLSTP LGBTQ Scientist of the Year in 2012.

Nominated for a Discover Innovation Award by Discover magazine for work on the Interplanetary Superhighway.
