= AMC-14 =

Communications satellite

- Names: AMC-14; DoD satellite
- Mission type: Communications
- Operator: SES Americom / DoD
- COSPAR ID: 2008-011A
- SATCAT no.: 32708
- Mission duration: 15 years (planned); 18 years, 7 months, 11 days (elapsed)

Spacecraft properties
- Spacecraft: AMC-14
- Bus: A2100AX
- Manufacturer: Lockheed Martin
- Launch mass: 4,140 kg (9,130 lb)

Start of mission
- Launch date: 14 March 2008, 23:18:55 UTC
- Rocket: Proton-M / Briz-M
- Launch site: Baikonur, Site 200/39
- Contractor: Khrunichev State Research and Production Space Center
- Entered service: January 2009

Orbital parameters
- Reference system: Geocentric orbit
- Regime: Geostationary orbit
- Longitude: 61.5° West (planned); 34.8° East (operational)

Transponders
- Band: 32 Ku-band
- Bandwidth: 24 MHz

AMC-14 is a communications satellite. Initially owned by SES Americom, AMC-14 was designed to be placed in geostationary orbit, following launch on a Proton-M / Briz-M space vehicle. Built by Lockheed Martin and based on the A2100 satellite bus, AMC-14 was to have been located at 61.5° West longitude for Dish Network service.

It was launched atop a Proton-M / Briz-M launch vehicle at 23:18:55 UTC on 14 March 2008, from Site 200/39 at the Baikonur Cosmodrome in Kazakhstan. The satellite was placed in an unusable orbit, following a malfunction of the Briz-M upper stage. Over a six-month period, it was maneuvered into a geosynchronous orbit, and is now near 35° East and in an inclined orbit.

== Satellite description ==
AMC-14 is based on the Lockheed Martin A2100 satellite bus, and includes 32 Ku-band transponders to provide 24 MHz of bandwidth each. The spacecraft antenna were originally designed to operate over either of two orbital arcs: 61.5° West to 77° West or 110° West to 148° West. AMC-14 carries an active phased array demonstration payload that allows coverage to be reshaped on orbit.

== Launch anomaly ==
An anomaly occurred during the second burn of the Briz-M upper stage. As a result, the satellite failed to reach the planned orbit. The Russian commission investigating the anomaly determined the cause to be a rupture of the gas duct between the gas generator and the propellant pump turbine in the Briz-M main engine, which caused the upper stage engine to shut down two minutes early.

AMC-14 was the 36th A2100 spacecraft and was expected to provide more than 15 years of service life. SES and Lockheed Martin explored ways to attempt to bring the functioning satellite into its correct orbital position, and subsequently began attempting to move the satellite into geosynchronous orbit by means of a lunar flyby (as done a decade earlier with HGS-1).

In April 2008, it was announced that this had been abandoned after discovery that Boeing held a patent on the trajectory that would be required. At the time, a lawsuit was ongoing between SES and Boeing, and Boeing refused to allow the trajectory to be used unless SES dropped its case. Another company had expressed interest in purchasing the satellite; however. SES began procedures to expedite the satellite's immediate de-orbit. While sources within the space industry told Space Daily that the patent would not stand up to legal challenge, SES intend to de-orbit the spacecraft in order to collect the insurance payout. If this attempt had been successful, the extra use of fuel needed to correct the orbital error would have significantly reduced AMC-14's originally expected service life of 15 years to just four years.

== Satellite's fate ==
SES Americom told its insurers that the AMC-14 was a total loss because it was in the wrong orbit and could not be moved into correct orbit, according to Thomson Financial. The satellite was fully insured for about US$150 million, so SES would not incur a loss. Officials stated that they had evaluated several options for recovering the marooned satellite. Saving AMC-14 would have used much of the satellite's operational maneuvering propellant, significantly reducing its useful life from the 15-year expectation before launch.

On 23 April 2008, it was reported that SES was in talks with a United States Department of Defense agency, presumably the National Reconnaissance Office (NRO) (the agency that operates satellites for the DoD), over purchasing the satellite. SES has received several other bids, including one from Echostar, have been received. Most of the commercial companies were intending to use the Lunar flyby trajectory option to correct the orbital inclination of the satellite, while the U.S. DoD planned to leave the satellite in an inclined orbit. SES preferred the DoD bid, as they did not want a customer to prove to insurers that the lunar flyby option would have resulted in a commercially viable service life. There were some concerns over the legality of a purchase by the U.S. Government, under the 1998 Commercial Space Act.

In anticipation of the U.S. Government's offer being viewed as illegal, an independent European/Asian investment group made a counteroffer to the insurers that called for a minimum upfront cash payment of US$15 million with the intention of returning the satellite to a geosynchronous orbit using the lunar flyby mission and thereafter providing commercial services. Negotiations were slow to start in spite of the alternative US$10 million purchase proposal from the U.S. Government which was 33% lower than the improved offer from the European/Asian investment group.

The first signs of an orbital adjustment maneuver became evident one day after SES announced it was in sales negotiations on 24 April 2008, when the satellite's perigee rose by about 56 km (35 mi) to 777 km (483 mi) along with a slight rise in apogee to 35572 km. Also, for comparison, at the time inclination was 48.989°, and it had an orbital period of 638.12 minutes. As of 6 August 2008, AMC-14 orbit is vastly different. The inclination has dropped to 17.7°.

As of 29 January 2009, after more than 6 months of low-thrust maneuvering, AMC-14 had finally reached an inclined (13.1°) geosynchronous orbit at 34.8° East under U.S. DoD ownership.

== See also ==
- PAS-22

== Note ==
- "AMC-14 Satellite Slated for March 15 Launch" (Press release). SES Americom. 20 February 2008. Archived from the original on 20 July 2011.
- "Lockheed Martin-Built AMC-14 Satellite Ready For Launch From Baikonur Cosmodrome" (Press release). Lockheed Martin. 12 March 2008. Archived from the original on 15 March 2008.
