= Danuri =

First South Korean lunar orbiter

Korea Pathfinder Lunar Orbiter (KPLO)
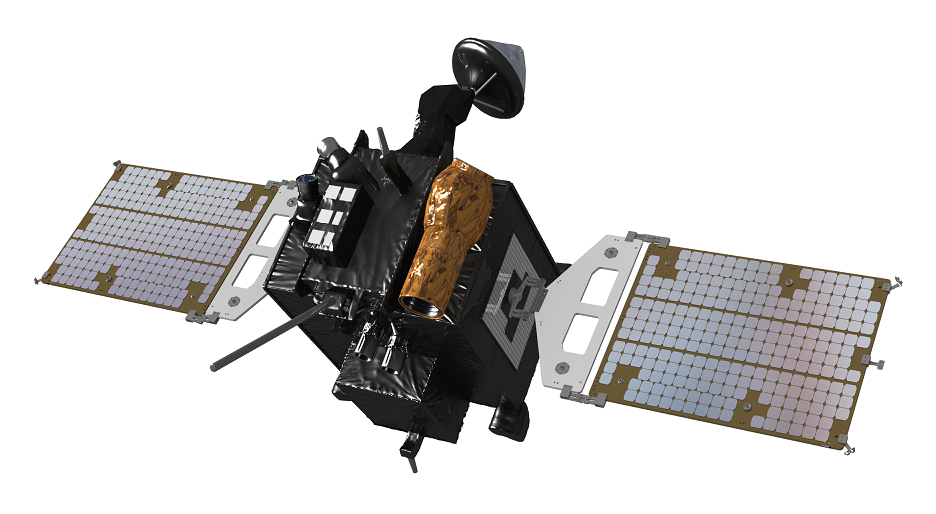
- A rendered image of KPLO
- Names: KPLO
- Mission type: Lunar orbiter
- Operator: Korea Aerospace Research Institute (KARI)
- COSPAR ID: 2022-094A
- SATCAT no.: 53365
- Website: www.kari.re.kr/eng/sub03_07_01.do
- Mission duration: 1377 days, 23 hours and 14 minutes (elapsed)

Spacecraft properties
- Manufacturer: Korea Aerospace Research Institute (KARI)
- Launch mass: 678 kg (1,495 lb)
- Dry mass: c. 550 kg (1,210 lb)
- Payload mass: 40 kg (88 lb)
- Power: 760 watts

Start of mission
- Launch date: 4 August 2022, 23:08:48 UTC
- Rocket: Falcon 9 Block 5
- Launch site: Cape Canaveral (CCSFS), SLC-40
- Contractor: SpaceX

Moon orbiter
- Orbital insertion: 17 December 2022 KST (1st); 28 December 2022 KST (5th)

Orbital parameters
- Periselene altitude: 100 km
- Aposelene altitude: 100 km
- Inclination: 90° (polar)

Transponders
- Band: S-band, X-band

Instruments
- Lunar Terrain Imager (LUTI); Wide-Angle Polarimetric Camera (PolCam); KPLO Magnetometer (KMAG); KPLO Gamma Ray Spectrometer (KGRS); Delay-Tolerant Networking experiment (DTNPL); ShadowCam (NASA)

The Korea Pathfinder Lunar Orbiter (KPLO), officially Danuri, is South Korea's first lunar mission. The orbiter, its science payload and ground control infrastructure are technology demonstrators. The orbiter will also be tasked with surveying lunar resources such as water ice, uranium, helium-3, silicon, and aluminium, and produce a topographic map to help select future lunar landing sites.

The mission was launched on 4 August 2022 on a Falcon 9 Block 5 launch vehicle. It was inserted into orbit around the Moon on 16 December 2022 (UTC).

== Name ==
On 23 May 2022, the South Korean Ministry of Science and ICT officially named the Korea Pathfinder Lunar Orbiter (시험용 달 궤도선, 試驗用月軌道船) as "Danuri" (다누리). Danuri is a portmanteau of two Korean words, dal (달) which means moon and nurida (누리다) which means enjoy. According to the ministry, this new name implies a big hope and desire for the success of South Korea's first Moon mission.

== Overview ==
South Korea's space agency, called Korea Aerospace Research Institute (KARI), together with NASA produced a lunar orbiter feasibility study in July 2014. The two agencies signed an agreement in December 2016 where NASA will collaborate with one science instrument payload, telecommunications, navigation, and mission design.

The Korean Lunar Exploration Program (KLEP) is divided in two phases. Phase 1 is the launch and operation of KPLO, which is the first lunar probe by South Korea, meant to develop and enhance South Korea's technological capabilities, as well as map natural resources from orbit. The key goals of the KPLO orbiter mission include investigation of lunar geology and space environment, exploration of lunar resources, and testing of future space technology which will assist in future human activities on the Moon and beyond.

Phase 2 will include a lunar orbiter, a lunar lander, and a 20 kg rover, to be launched together on a KSLV-3 South Korean launch vehicle from the Naro Space Center, by 2032.

== Objectives ==
The main objectives of this mission are to enhance the South Korean technological capabilities on the ground and in outer space, and to "increase both the national brand value and national pride". The specific technological objectives are:

- Development of critical technologies for lunar exploration.
- Produce a topographic map for support to select future lunar landing sites, and to survey lunar resources such as water ice, uranium, helium-3, silicon, and aluminium.
- Development and validation of new space technologies.

From the lunar science perspective, understanding the water cycle on the Moon is critical to mapping and exploitation. Solar wind protons can chemically reduce the abundant iron oxides present in the lunar soil, producing native metal iron (Fe^{0}) and a hydroxyl ion (OH^{−}) that can readily capture a proton to form water (H_{2}O). Hydroxyl and water molecules are thought to be transported throughout the lunar surface by mysterious unknown mechanisms, and they seem to accumulate at permanently shadowed areas that offer protection from heat and solar radiation.

=== Space Internet ===
To test the experimental system of the “space Internet”, Danuri successfully forwarded a number of photos taken, as well as several video files, including, BTS’ “Dynamite” from outer space to Earth at Korea's Ministry of Science and ICT, Korea Aerospace Research Institute (KARI), and the Electronics and Telecommunications Research Institute (ETRI) on 7 November 2022.

== Science payload ==
KPLO carries six science instruments with a total mass of approximately 40 kg (88 lb). Five instruments are from South Korea and one from NASA:

- Lunar Terrain Imager (LUTI) will take images of probable landing sites for the second stage lunar exploration mission and special target sites of the lunar surfaces with a high spatial resolution (<5 m).
- Wide-Angle Polarimetric Camera (PolCam) will acquire the polarimetric images of the entire lunar surface except for the polar regions with medium spatial resolution in order to investigate the detailed characteristics of lunar regolith.
- KPLO Magnetometer (KMAG) is a magnetometer that will measure the magnetic strength of the lunar environment (up to ~100 km above the lunar surface) with ultra-sensitive magnetic sensors.
- KPLO Gamma Ray Spectrometer (KGRS) is a gamma-ray spectrometer that will investigate the chemical composition of lunar surface materials within a gamma-ray energy range from 10 keV to 10 MeV, and map their spatial distribution.
- Delay-Tolerant Networking experiment (DTNPL) will perform a communication experiment on delay-tolerant networking (DTN), a type of interplanetary Internet for communication with landed assets.
- NASA's ShadowCam will map the reflectance within the permanently shadowed regions to search for evidence of water ice deposits.

=== ShadowCam ===
ShadowCam is a hypersensitive optical camera designed to collect images of permanently shadowed regions (PSRs) near the Moon's poles. This allows ShadowCam to map the reflectance of these regions to search for evidence of ice deposits, observe seasonal changes, and measure the terrain inside the craters. The instrument is based on the Lunar Reconnaissance Orbiter LROC narrow angle camera (NAC), but it is 200 times more sensitive to allow for capturing details within the permanently shadowed regions. ShadowCam was developed by scientists at Arizona State University and Malin Space Science Systems. The first released ShadowCam image showed the wall the and floor of Shackleton crater.

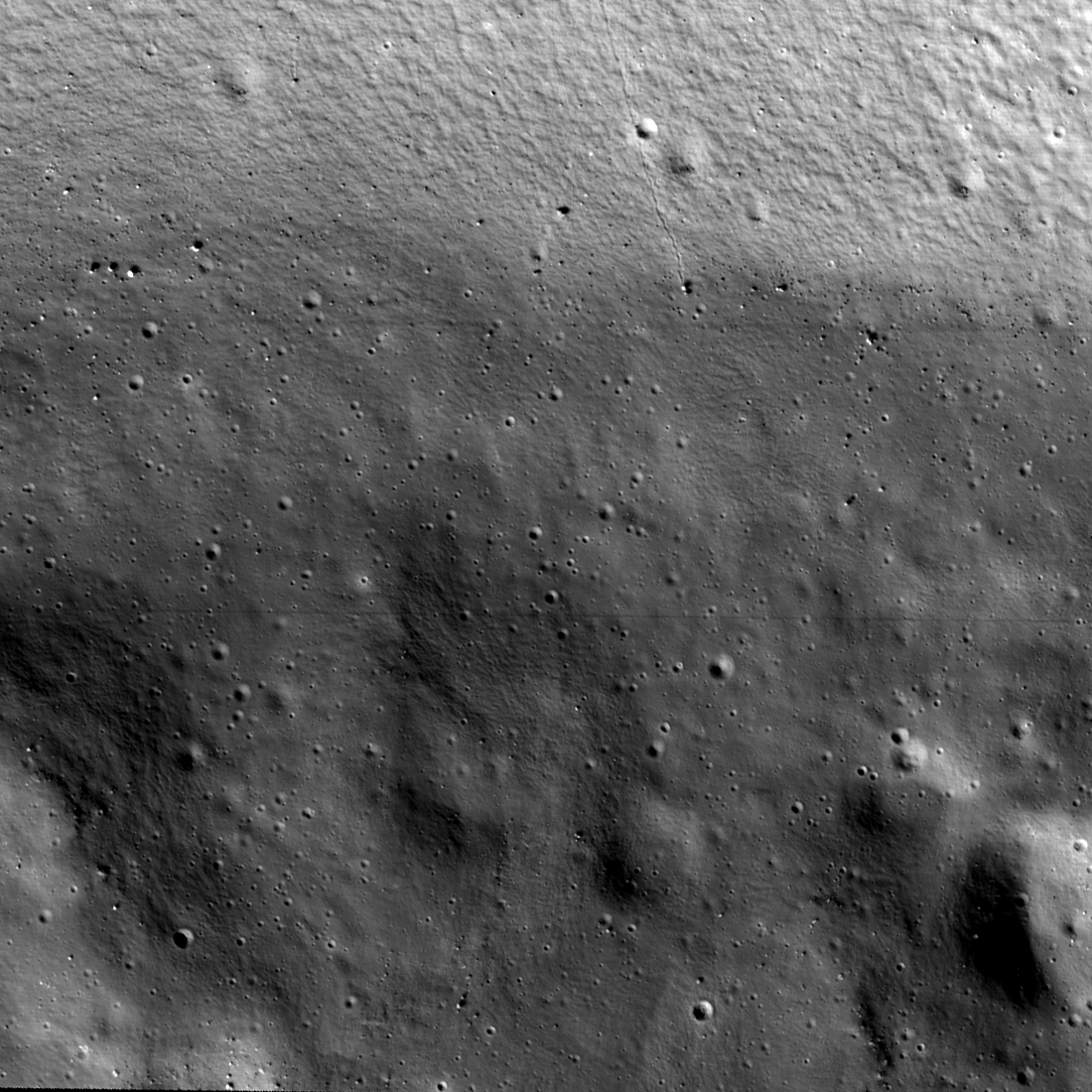
First photo by ShadowCam, Shackleton crater

Science objectives of the ShadowCam experiment:

Map albedo patterns in PSRs and interpret their nature
ShadowCam will search for frost, ice, and lag deposits by mapping reflectance with resolution and signal-to-noise ratios comparable to LROC NAC images of illuminated terrain.
Investigate the origin of anomalous radar signatures associated with some polar craters
ShadowCam will determine whether high-purity ice or rocky deposits are present inside PSRs.
Document and interpret temporal changes of PSR albedo units
ShadowCam will search for seasonal changes in volatile abundance in PSRs by acquiring monthly observations.
Provide hazard and trafficability information within PSRs for future landed elements
ShadowCam will provide optimal terrain information necessary for polar exploration.
Map the morphology of PSRs to search for and characterize landforms that may be indicative of permafrost-like processes
ShadowCam will provide unprecedented images of PSR geomorphology at scales that enable detailed comparisons with terrain anywhere on the Moon.

== Launch ==
Originally planned for a December 2018 launch, KPLO was placed into orbit by a Falcon 9 launch vehicle on 4 August 2022. Because Danuri was launched as a dedicated Falcon 9 mission, the payload along with Falcon 9's second stage was placed directly on an Earth escape trajectory and into heliocentric orbit when the second stage reignited for a second engine startup or escape burn.

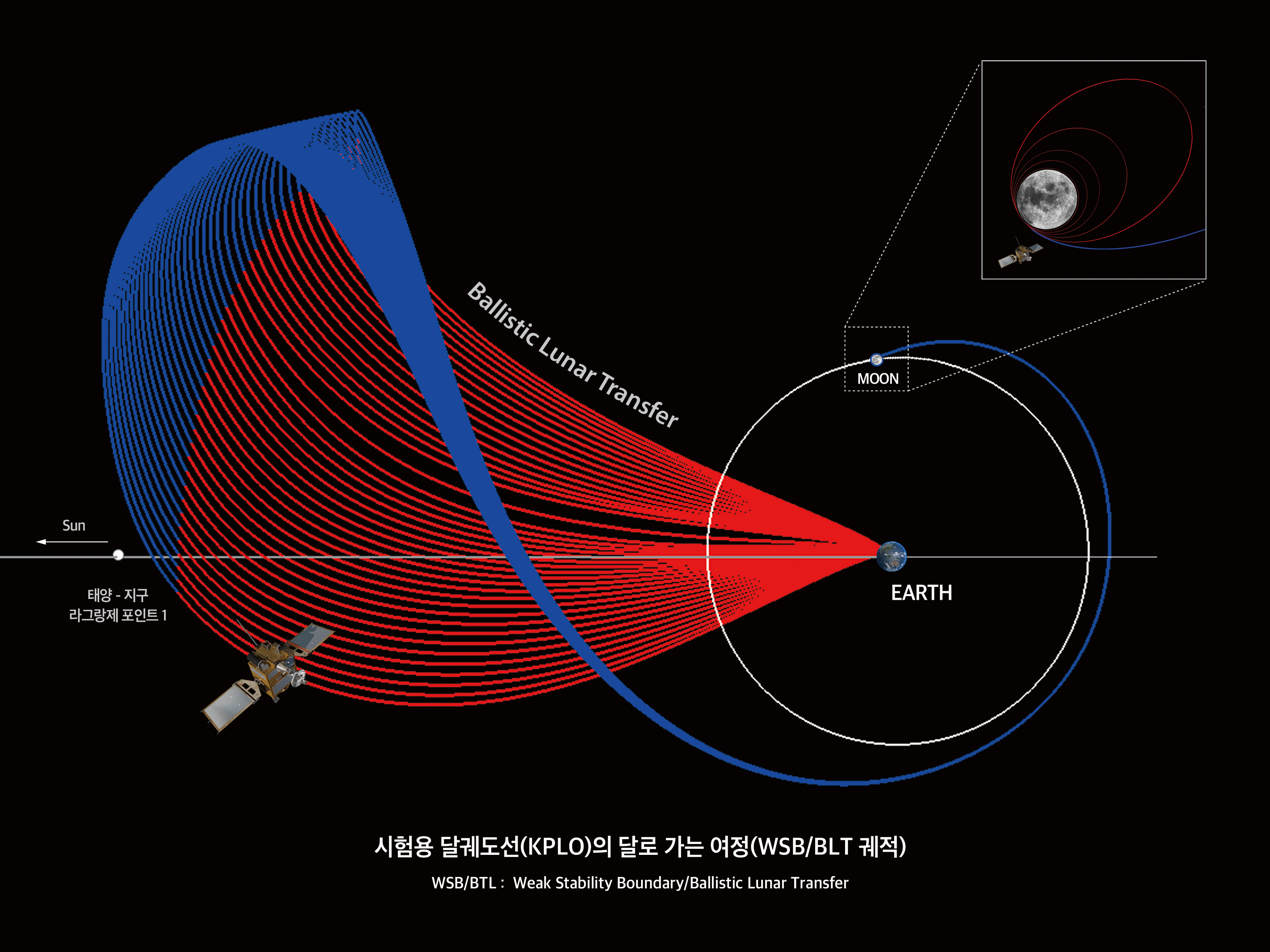
The trajectory of KPLO (Danuri) via the ballistic lunar transfer (BLT)

As KPLO uses ballistic lunar transfer (BLT) to transfer to a Moon orbit, it took the spacecraft about 135 days to reach the Moon, with a lunar-orbit insertion on 16 December 2022 (UTC). After insertion, the spacecraft will conduct a set of phasing-burns to reduce the orbit's eccentricity from elliptic to circular, reaching low-lunar orbit. This was a change of plan from the previous one, where the orbiter would have performed at least three highly elliptical orbits of Earth, each time increasing its velocity and altitude until it reaches escape velocity, initiating a trans-lunar injection.

The spacecraft's main propulsion is from four 30-newton thrusters, and for attitude control (orientation) it uses four 5-newton thrusters.

Animation of Danuri

Around the Earth

Around the Sun - Frame rotating with the Earth

Around the Moon

Earth · Danuri · Moon · L1 point

== See also ==
- Exploration of the Moon
- List of missions to the Moon
- Lunar water
- Naro Space Center
- South Korean space program
