= MUSES Program =

The MUSES Program (Mu Space Engineering Spacecraft) was a Japanese space programme consisting of:

- MUSES-A, the Hiten moon spacecraft
- MUSES-B, the HALCA (Highly Advanced Laboratory for Communications and Astronomy) mission
- MUSES-C, the Hayabusa asteroid sample return spacecraft
