= Low-energy transfer =

Fuel-efficient orbital maneuver

An example of Low-energy transfer to the Moon GRAIL-A · Moon · Earth

A low-energy transfer, or low-energy trajectory, is a route in space that allows spacecraft to change orbits using significantly less fuel than traditional transfers. These routes work in the Earth–Moon system and also in other systems, such as between the moons of Jupiter. The drawback of such trajectories is that they take longer to complete than higher-energy (more-fuel) transfers, such as Hohmann transfer orbits.

Low-energy transfers are also known as weak stability boundary trajectories, and include ballistic capture trajectories.

Low-energy transfers follow special pathways in space, sometimes referred to as the Interplanetary Transport Network. Following these pathways allows for long distances to be traversed for little change in velocity, or delta-v.

== Example missions ==
SLIM's trajectory included a low energy transfer

Missions that have used low-energy transfers include:

- Hiten, from JAXA
- SMART-1, from ESA
- Genesis, from NASA.
- GRAIL, from NASA.
- Danuri from KARI

On-going missions that use low-energy transfers include:

- BepiColombo, from ESA/JAXA
- CAPSTONE from NASA
- SLIM, from JAXA

Proposed missions using low-energy transfers include:

- European Student Moon Orbiter (ESMO)
- Mars Direct

== History ==
Low-energy transfers to the Moon were first demonstrated in 1991 by the Japanese spacecraft Hiten, which was designed to swing by the Moon but not to enter orbit. The Hagoromo subsatellite was released by Hiten on its first swing-by and may have successfully entered lunar orbit, but suffered a communications failure.

Edward Belbruno and James Miller of the Jet Propulsion Laboratory had heard of the failure, and helped to salvage the mission by developing a ballistic capture trajectory that would enable the main Hiten probe to itself enter lunar orbit. The trajectory they developed for Hiten used Weak Stability Boundary Theory and required only a small perturbation to the elliptical swing-by orbit, sufficiently small to be achievable by the spacecraft's thrusters. This course would result in the probe being captured into temporary lunar orbit using zero delta-v, but required five months instead of the usual three days for a Hohmann transfer.

== Delta-v savings ==
From low Earth orbit to lunar orbit, the delta-v savings approach 25% on the burn applied after leaving low Earth orbit, compared to the retrograde burn applied near the Moon in the traditional trans-lunar injection, and allow for a doubling of payload.

Robert Farquhar has described a 9-day route from low earth orbit to lunar capture that takes 3.5 km/s. Belbruno's routes from low Earth orbit require a 3.1 km/s burn for trans lunar injection, a delta-v saving of not more than 0.4 km/s. However, the latter require no large delta-v change after leaving low Earth orbit, which may have operational benefits if using an upper stage with limited restart or in-orbit endurance capability, which would require the spacecraft to have a separate main propulsion system for capture.

For rendezvous with the Martian moons, the savings are 12% for Phobos and 20% for Deimos. Rendezvous is targeted because the stable pseudo-orbits around the Martian moons do not spend much time within 10 km of the surface.

== See also ==
- Bi-elliptic transfer
- Delta-v budget
- Gravity assist
- Interplanetary Transport Network
- Orbital mechanics
