= Hiten (spacecraft) =

1990 Japanese lunar probe

Hiten-Hagoromo
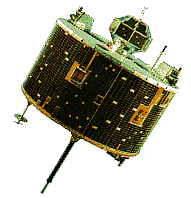
- Hiten spacecraft
- Names: MUSES-A (before launch)
- Operator: ISAS
- COSPAR ID: 1990-007A
- SATCAT no.: 20448
- Website: ISAS Hiten page
- Mission duration: 3 years, 2 months and 17 days

Spacecraft properties
- Launch mass: 197 kg

Start of mission
- Launch date: 11:46, January 24, 1990 (UTC)
- Rocket: Mu-3S-II (no. 5)
- Launch site: Uchinoura Space Center

End of mission
- Decay date: 18:03:25, April 10, 1993 (UTC)

Flyby of Moon
- Closest approach: 20:04:09, March 18, 1990
- Distance: 16,472.4 km (10,235.5 mi)

Moon orbiter
- Orbital insertion: 13:33, February 15, 1993

Orbital parameters
- Periselene altitude: 6.52 Lunar radii
- Aposelene altitude: 29.42 Lunar radii
- Inclination: 34.7°

Moon impactor
- Impact date: 18:03:25.7, April 10, 1993
- Impact site: 34.3°S 55.6°E

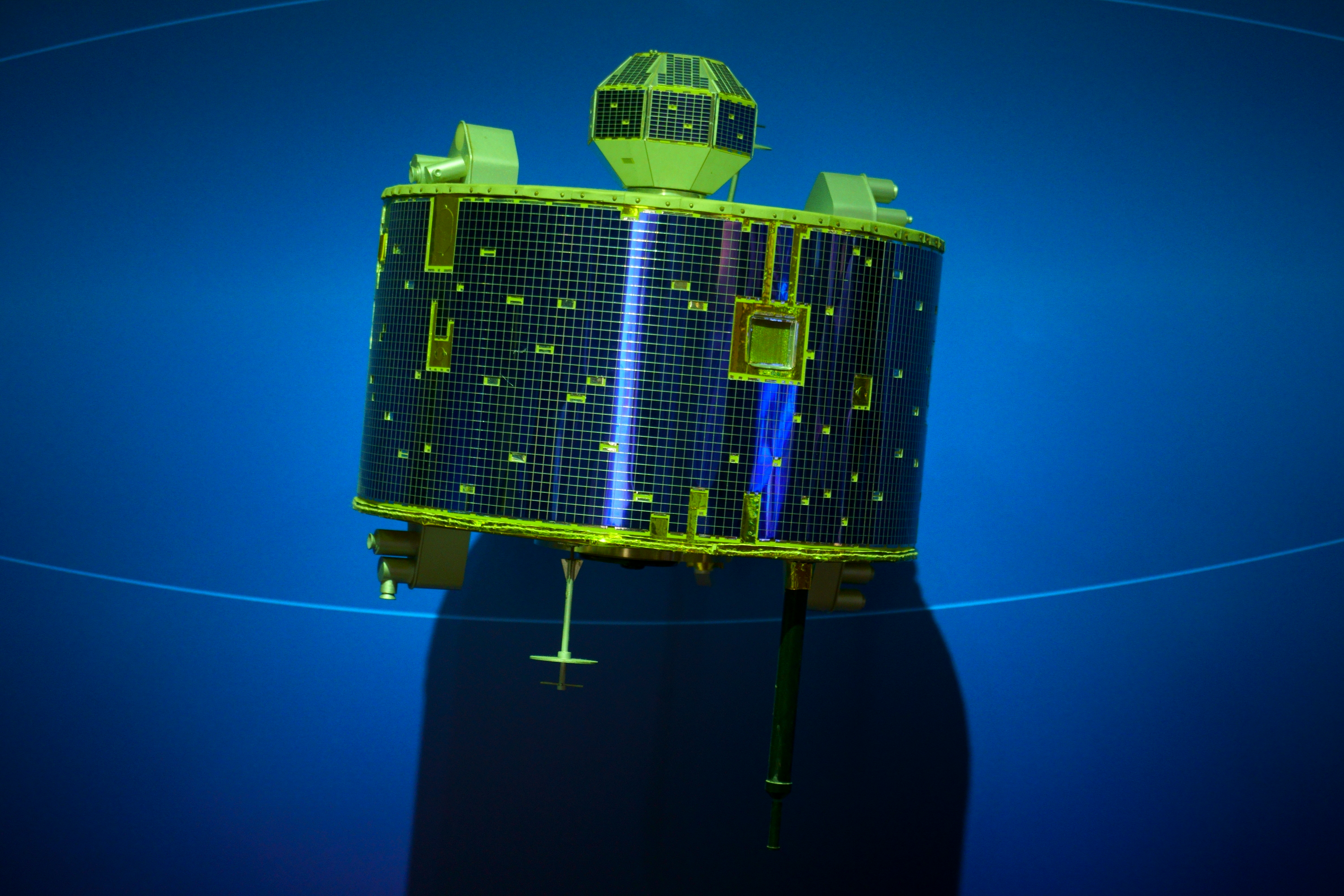
Scale model of the Hiten at Noshiro City Children's Center

Hiten model at Sagamihara city museum

The Hiten spacecraft (ひてん, Japanese pronunciation: [çiteɴ]), given the English name Celestial Maiden and known before launch as MUSES-A (Mu Space Engineering Spacecraft A), part of the MUSES Program, was built by the Institute of Space and Astronautical Science of Japan and launched on January 24, 1990. It was Japan's first lunar probe, the first robotic lunar probe since the Soviet Union's Luna 24 in 1976, and the first lunar probe launched by a country other than the Soviet Union or the United States. The spacecraft was named after flying heavenly beings in Japanese Buddhism.

== History ==
Hiten was to be placed into a highly elliptical Earth orbit with an apogee of 476,000 km, which would swing past the Moon. However, the injection took place with a delta-v deficit of 50 m/s, resulting in an apogee of only 290,000 km. The deficiency was corrected and the probe continued on its mission.

On the first lunar swing-by, Hiten released a small orbiter, Hagoromo (はごろも, named after the feather mantle of Hiten), into lunar orbit. The transmitter on Hagoromo failed, and even though ignition of Hagoromo's deceleration rockets was confirmed by ground observation, it could never be confirmed if the spacecraft had successfully inserted itself into lunar orbit or failed to capture, entering a heliocentric orbit. After the eighth swing-by, Hiten successfully demonstrated the aerobraking technique on March 19, 1991, flying by the Earth at an altitude of 125.5 km over the Pacific at 11.0 km/s. Atmospheric drag lowered Hiten's velocity by 1.712 m/s and its apogee altitude by 8665 km. This was the first aerobraking maneuver by a deep space probe. After the ninth lunar swing-by and second aerobraking maneuver on March 30, 1991, the primary mission of the probe was concluded.

== First ballistic capture into lunar orbit ==
Edward Belbruno and James Miller of the Jet Propulsion Laboratory heard of the failure of the Hagoromo orbiter and helped to salvage the mission by developing a so-called ballistic capture trajectory that would enable the main Hiten probe to enter lunar orbit. Belbruno had been working on numerically modelling low-energy trajectories, and heard of the probe's problems. He developed a trajectory solution and on June 22, 1990, sent an unsolicited proposal to the Japanese space agency. They responded favorably, and later implemented a version of the proposal.

The trajectory Belbruno and Miller developed for Hiten used Weak Stability Boundary Theory and required only a small perturbation to the elliptical swing-by orbit, sufficiently small to be achievable by the spacecraft's thrusters. This course would result in the probe being captured into temporary lunar orbit using zero delta-v (called a ballistic transfer), but required five months instead of the usual three days for a Hohmann transfer orbit. This was the first time a satellite had used low-energy transfer to transfer to a Moon orbit. On October 2, 1991, Hiten was captured temporarily into lunar orbit.

After that, Hiten was put into a looping orbit which passed through the L_{4} and L_{5} Lagrange points to look for trapped dust particles: the then-tentatively observed Kordylewski clouds. The only scientific instrument on Hiten was the Munich Dust Counter (MDC); no increase over background levels was observed. On February 15, 1993, Hiten was placed into a permanent lunar orbit, where it remained until it was deliberately crashed into the lunar surface on April 10, 1993 at 34.3°S 55.6°E, between the craters Stevinus and Furnerius. Because the orbit was unstable and would have resulted in the spacecraft crashing into the far side of the Moon, it was decided to use the last fuel to move the impact location to the front side of the Moon so that it could be observed.

== See also ==
- List of artificial objects on the Moon
- List of missions to the Moon
