= Edward Belbruno =

German astronomer and mathematician

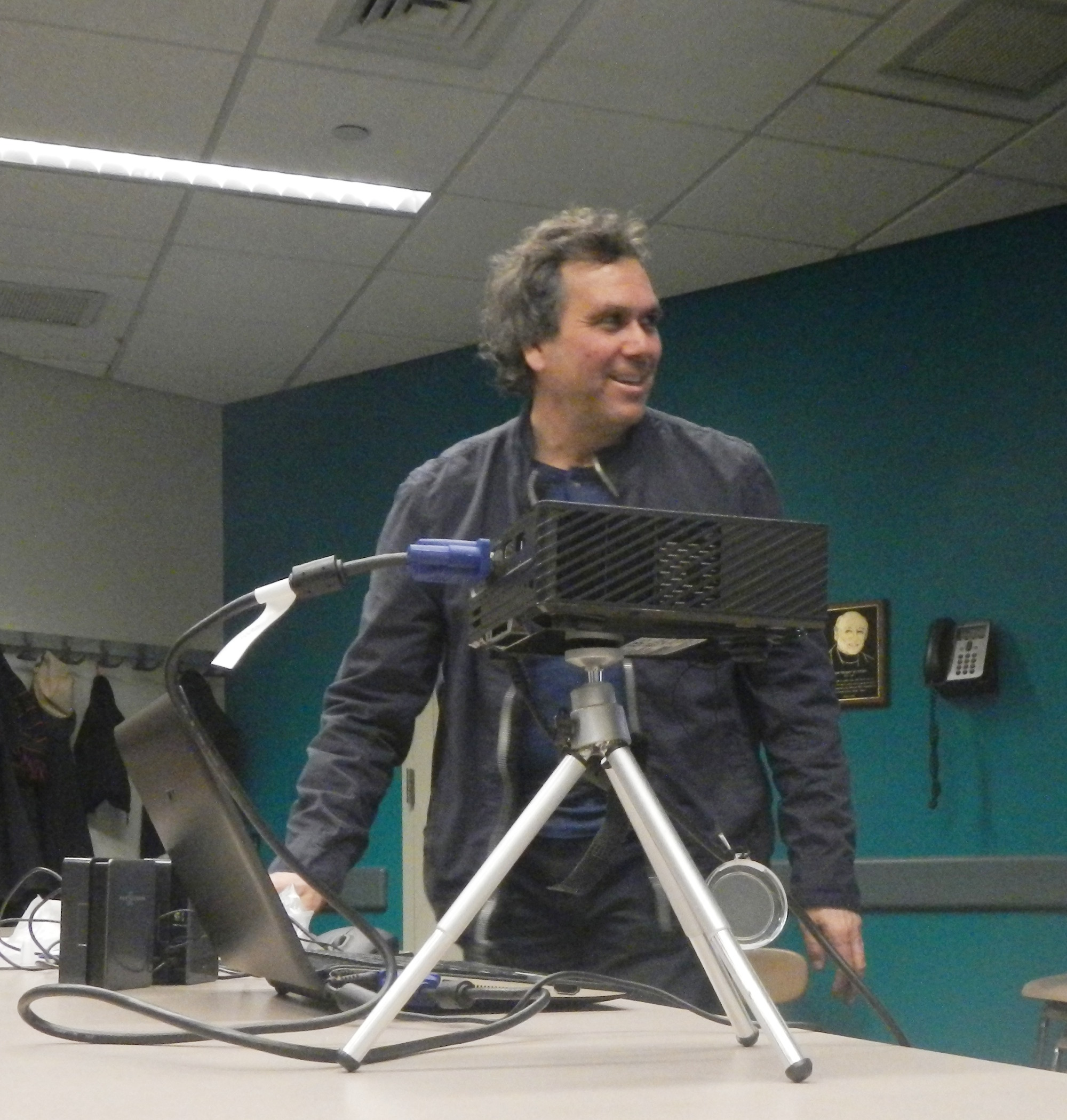
- Belbruno lecturing to an astronomy club
- Born: August 2, 1951 (age 75); USAG Army Base, Heidelberg, Germany
- Citizenship: United States
- Education: New York University
- Awards: Humboldt Research Award (2017) Aviation Week Laurels Award (1998) for rescue of HGS-1
- Scientific career
- Fields: Celestial mechanics
- Workplaces: Boston University 1980-1985, Jet Propulsion Laboratory 1985 - 1990, Pomona College 1990 - 1991, University of Minnesota 1992 - 1997, Princeton University Yeshiva University
- Website: www.edbelbruno.com

Edward Belbruno (born August 2, 1951) is an American mathematician. His research areas are in celestial mechanics, dynamical systems, dynamical astronomy, and aerospace engineering.

== Early life ==
Belbruno was born in the USAG Army Base in Heidelberg, Germany. He received his associate degree from Mitchell College, his Bachelor of Science degree in mathematics from New York University and his PhD in mathematics from New York University's Courant Institute in 1981, where his mentor was mathematician Jürgen Moser.

== Career ==
He worked as mathematician at Boston University until 1985. He was employed by the Jet Propulsion Laboratory from 1985 to 1990 as an orbital analyst on such missions as Galileo, Magellan, Cassini, Ulysses, Mars Observer, and others. During that time, he laid the foundations for the first systematic application of chaos theory to space flight originally called fuzzy boundary theory, which allows for the construction of very low energy paths for spacecraft.

Belbruno had first proposed using a low-energy transfer orbit for a JPL probe in 1988. However, he faced a great deal of skepticism, and found himself in conflict with engineers. He had also expected to make no progress on Hiten, but the Japanese proved receptive to his ideas and called ballistic capture an "amazing result." He left JPL in fall of 1990 and took a position at Pomona College.

Belbruno is president and founder of the company Innovative Orbital Design, Inc., based in Princeton, New Jersey and holds patents on routes in space. He consulted on the rescue of the Asiasat-3 communications satellite for Hughes, although a different trajectory was ultimately used for the rescue.

Belbruno's books include Fly Me to the Moon and Capture Dynamics and Chaotic Motions in Celestial Mechanics. He is a consultant with the National Aeronautics and Space Administration, and has made appearances on NBC's Today Show and NPR's Studio 360 entitled "Propelled to Paint".

The abstract expressionist paintings of Ed Belbruno reflect both inner and outer realities. Belbruno is self-taught and draws inspiration from his subconscious and his personal life, but is also deeply influenced by his research in math, science, and astrophysics. Belbruno was featured at the Shanghai Art Fair, November 2–5, 2017 and the West Contemporary Arts Appreciation Society exhibition, in Weihai in 2018. An exhibition of his work at Agora Gallery (530 West 25th Street, New York) on Thursday, Nov. 14, 2019 included a screening of the documentary "Painting the Way to the Moon" and special guest Neil deGrasse Tyson.

A documentary by Jacob Okada called "Painting the Way to the Moon" explores the life, art, and science of NASA-JPL mathematician, Ed Belbruno, and includes a discussion on the nature of scientific creativity with Neil deGrasse Tyson. It won Best Feature Documentary at the Philip K. Dick, Boston Sci-Fi, and NYLA Film Festivals.

Belbruno was awarded the Humboldt Research Award in November, 2017 in recognition for his “Accomplishments in Research and Teaching in Mathematics as Applied to Celestial Mechanics, Astrodynamics and AstroPhysics”. The Humboldt Research Award is Germany's most prestigious award in mathematics and sciences which supported Belbruno in a yearlong stay in Germany at the University of Ausburg.

Currently, Belbruno is a Clinical Professor of Mathematics at Yeshiva University and a Visiting Research Collaborator at Princeton University.

== See also ==
- Interplanetary Transport Network
