= EV5 (disambiguation) =

EV5 may refer to:

- EV5 Via Romea Francigena, a long-distance cycling route in Europe
- Alpha 21164, a microprocessor known by its code name, EV5
- (341843) 2008 EV5, an asteroid
- Kia EV5, an electric SUV
