= Asteroid capture =

Orbital insertion of an asteroid around a larger planetary body

Asteroid capture is an orbital insertion of an asteroid around a larger planetary body. When asteroids, small rocky bodies in space, are captured, they become natural satellites, specifically either an irregular moon if permanently captured, or a temporary satellite.

All asteroids entering Earth's orbit or atmosphere so far have been natural phenomena; however, U.S. engineers have been working on methods for telerobotic spacecraft to retrieve asteroids using chemical or electrical propulsion. These two types of asteroid capture can be categorized as natural and artificial.

- Natural asteroid capture is ballistic capture of a free asteroid into orbit around a body such as a planet, due to gravitational forces.
- Artificial asteroid capture involves intentionally exerting a force to insert the asteroid into a specific orbit.

Artificial asteroid retrieval may provide scientists and engineers with information regarding asteroid composition, as asteroids are known to sometimes contain rare metals such as palladium and platinum. Attempts at asteroid retrieval include NASA’s Asteroid Redirect Missions from 2013. These efforts were canceled in 2017.

== Naturally captured asteroids ==
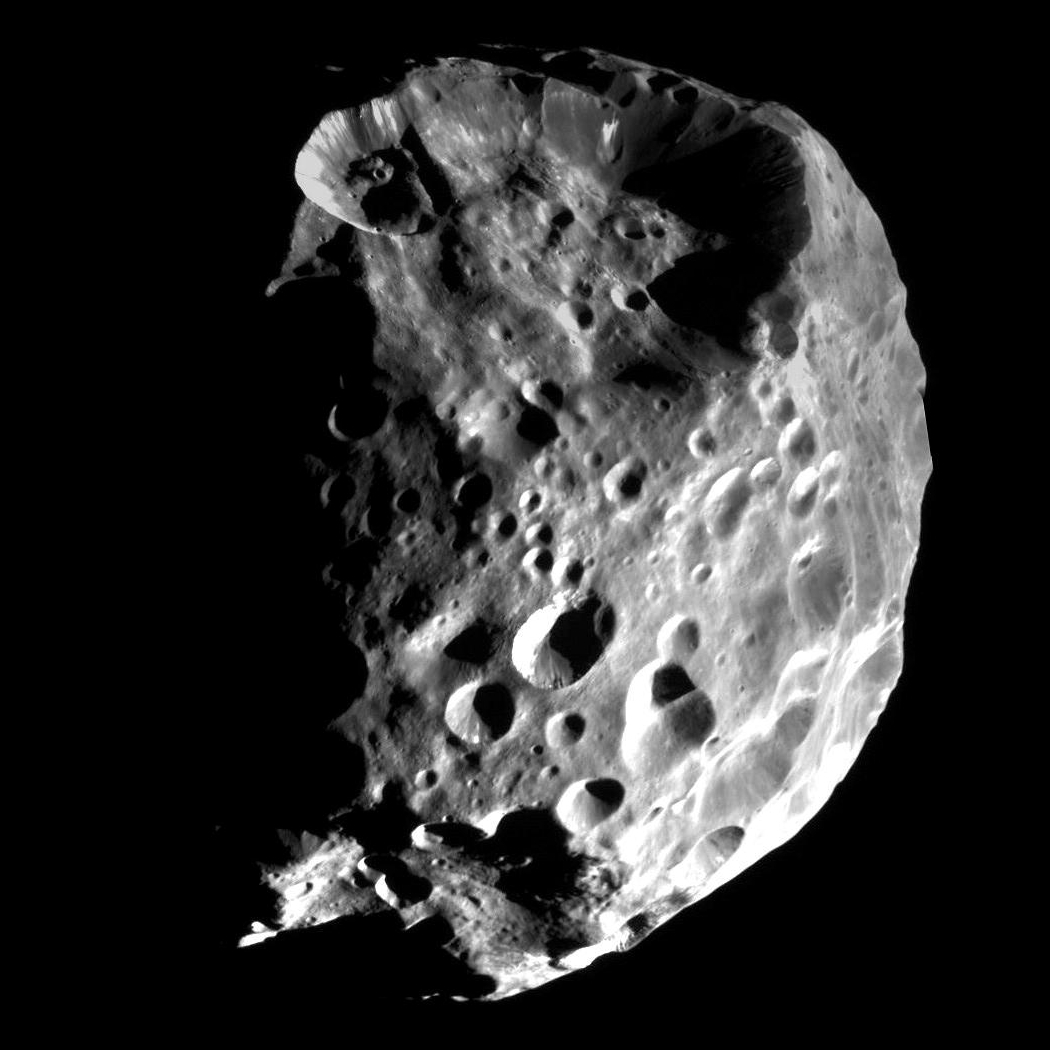
Phoebe is an irregular moon of Saturn on a distant and highly inclined retrograde orbit, unlike the rest of Saturn's regular moons. Because of its unusual orbit, Phoebe is thought to be a minor planet from the outer Solar System that was captured by Saturn.

Asteroid capture happens when an asteroid "misses" a planet when falling towards it, but it no longer has enough velocity to escape from the planet's orbit. In that case, the asteroid is captured, entering a stable orbit around the planet which does not pass through the planet's atmosphere. However, asteroids occasionally strike a planet. Small asteroids are estimated to hit Earth every 1,000 to 10,000 years.

The size and physical characteristics of an orbit depend on the planet's mass. An approaching asteroid will almost always enter a planet's sphere of influence on a hyperbolic trajectory relative to the planet. The asteroid's kinetic energy when it encounters the planet is too great for it to be brought into a bounded orbit by the planet's gravity; its kinetic energy is greater than its absolute potential energy with respect to the planet, meaning its velocity is higher than escape velocity. However, an asteroid's trajectory can be perturbed by another mass that could reduce its kinetic energy. If this brings the asteroid's velocity below the local escape velocity, its trajectory changes from a hyperbola to an ellipse and the asteroid is captured. Triton is thought to have been captured in this way, as are some of the outer moons of Jupiter.

When the trajectory changes over time, asteroids may collide. Considering the asteroid belt between Mars and Jupiter contains around 1.9 million asteroids, astronomers estimated that modest-sized asteroids collide with each other about once a year. The impact can change the trajectory of an asteroid, sending it into a planet's sphere of influence.

== Technology for capturing asteroids ==
=== Electric propulsion ===
Traditional chemical rockets work well in a thick atmosphere environment, but electric propulsion has higher propulsive efficiency than chemical propulsion. An ion thruster, for example, has an efficiency of 90 percent whilst chemical propulsion's efficiency is around 35 percent. In space, there is no atmospheric drag. Since carrying propellant to an asteroid is expensive, fetching a heavy asteroid requires an extremely efficient engine such as an electric one, or one that uses the asteroid's own material as reaction mass.

=== Robotic arms ===
Based on NASA's Asteroid Redirect Mission, a satellite would grab a boulder from a larger asteroid before returning to a predetermined orbit. Canadarm 2 is an example of an advanced robotic arm used in space, of the type which could be helpful in such a mission. Currently, the Canadarm 2 not only helps docking cargo spacecraft to the International Space Station but also performs station maintenance. Advancement in robotic arms helps artificial asteroid capture to perform precise collection of samples on the asteroid's surface.

=== Lunar flyby ===
Lunar flybys can also be used to capture an asteroid. The orbits of an asteroid before and after lunar flyby have different Jacobi constants. When the Jacobi constant of its orbit reaches a certain value, the asteroid will be captured. The capture regions of different pre-flyby Jacobi constants can be represented numerically, and these capture regions can be used to determine whether the asteroid can be captured by lunar flybys, which will finally be validated through the ephemerides model.

== Motivations for capture ==
=== Planetary defense ===
Asteroid capture missions can potentially allow significant progress in many areas relative to planetary defense against near-Earth objects:

1. Anchoring: Capture missions will enable the development of more reliable anchoring capability, which helps spacecraft attach to asteroids better, thus providing more options for the deflection of near-earth objects (NEO).
2. Structural Characterization: Capture missions will help engineers to improve structural characterization capability. One of the most mature NEO deflection technologies is through Kinetic Impact, but its effectiveness is highly unpredictable due to the lack of knowledge on the condition and structure of the NEO. If we can better understand a NEO's surface material and structure, we can use a Kinetic Impact to redirect it with greater certainty.
3. Dust Environment: Scientists will gain knowledge on the dust environment of NEOs, and better understand forces that can trigger dust levitation and settling behaviors. This knowledge will help with the design of some NEO redirection approaches, such as gravity tractors and conventional rocket engines.

=== Asteroid resources ===
Asteroid mining is a major reason to capture an asteroid. A relatively resource-poor LL chondrite asteroid contains 20% iron, as well as a significant quantity of volatiles in the form of water, minerals and oxygen. Although it is possible to bring these resources back to Earth, the high cost of transport and the abundance of resources on Earth means the primary goal of asteroid retrieval in the near future will be for immediate use in space. Asteroid mining is expected to be cheaper than sending those resources from Earth. Using conventional chemical propulsion, it is estimated by NASA that delivering one kilogram of mass to a high lunar orbit costs $100K. That would mean a $20B cost to deliver 500 tons, while an asteroid capture mission that delivers the same amount of material to high lunar orbit would ideally only cost $2.6B.

=== Further exploration ===
Artificial Asteroid Capture Missions can help scientists develop technologies that can be potentially useful for further exploration to other destinations in space:

1. Trajectory and Navigation. From the experience of maneuvering a large mass such as an asteroid, scientists can gain knowledge on how to navigate in the gravity fields of different celestial bodies. Artificial Asteroid Capture Missions can also help perfect capability to deliver large amounts of resources required for further space exploration.
2. Sample Collection and Containment Techniques. Artificial Asteroid Capture Missions will require samples from asteroids. This can help with the development of techniques for sample collection and containment, which will be useful for all types of space exploration missions.
3. Docking Capability. Further explorations into space will require much more robust docking capabilities to accommodate vehicles, habitats and cargo modules. Asteroid Capture Missions will help engineers improve these capabilities.

=== Base for habitation ===
If scientists can find an efficient way to utilize resources such as water, oxygen and metal collected from captured asteroids, these asteroids also have the potential to become bases for human habitation. The abundant mass of an asteroid can be valuable to a habitat due to its radiation shielding properties. Metals and other materials excavated from the asteroid can be used for construction of the habitat. If the asteroid is large enough, it could even provide some amount of gravity, which would be preferable for human habitation.

=== International cooperation ===
An international panel can oversee all asteroid retrievals and studies on collected materials and provide balanced, fair distribution of retrieved materials. Nations without an expensive space national program can still conduct research.

== Proposals ==
=== NASA redirect mission ===
The goal of proposed NASA Asteroid Redirect Mission was to send a robotic spacecraft to a large near-Earth asteroid and then collect a multi-ton boulder from its surface. The astronauts would take samples of the boulder and bring them back to Earth for further scientific study, and finally they will redirect it into orbit around the Moon so that it would not hit the Earth. This mission integrates robotic and crewed spacecraft operations and, if successful, would demonstrate key capabilities necessary for NASA's journey to Mars. However, White House Space Policy Directive 1 canceled the mission on Dec. 11, 2017 to accommodate increasing development costs. Technologies developed for this mission, such as solar electric propulsion, detection and characterization of small near-Earth asteroids, and the capability to capture large non-cooperative objects in deep space, will be used in future missions.

Proposed probes

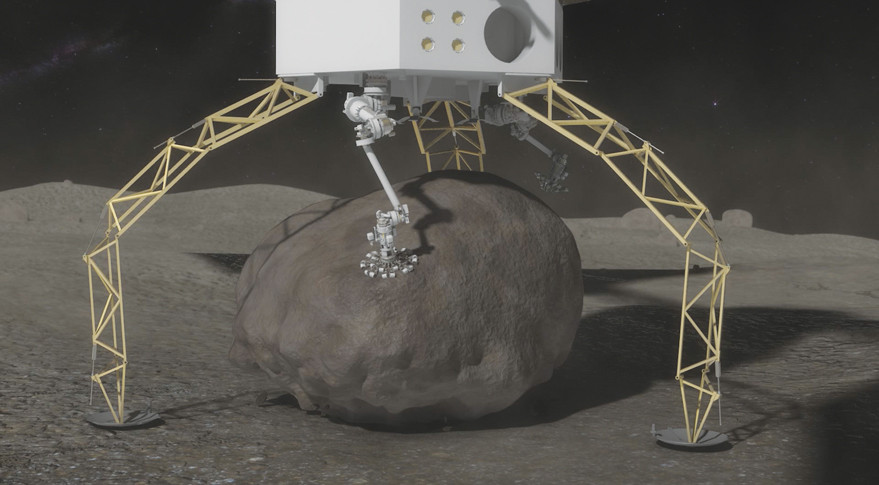
Asteroid grippers on the end of the robotic arms are used to grasp and secure a 6 m boulder from a large asteroid.

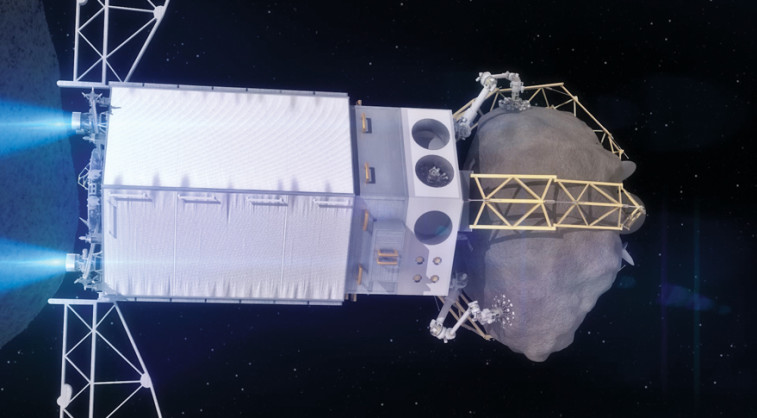
Rendering of the Asteroid Redirect Vehicle departing the asteroid after capturing a boulder from its surface.

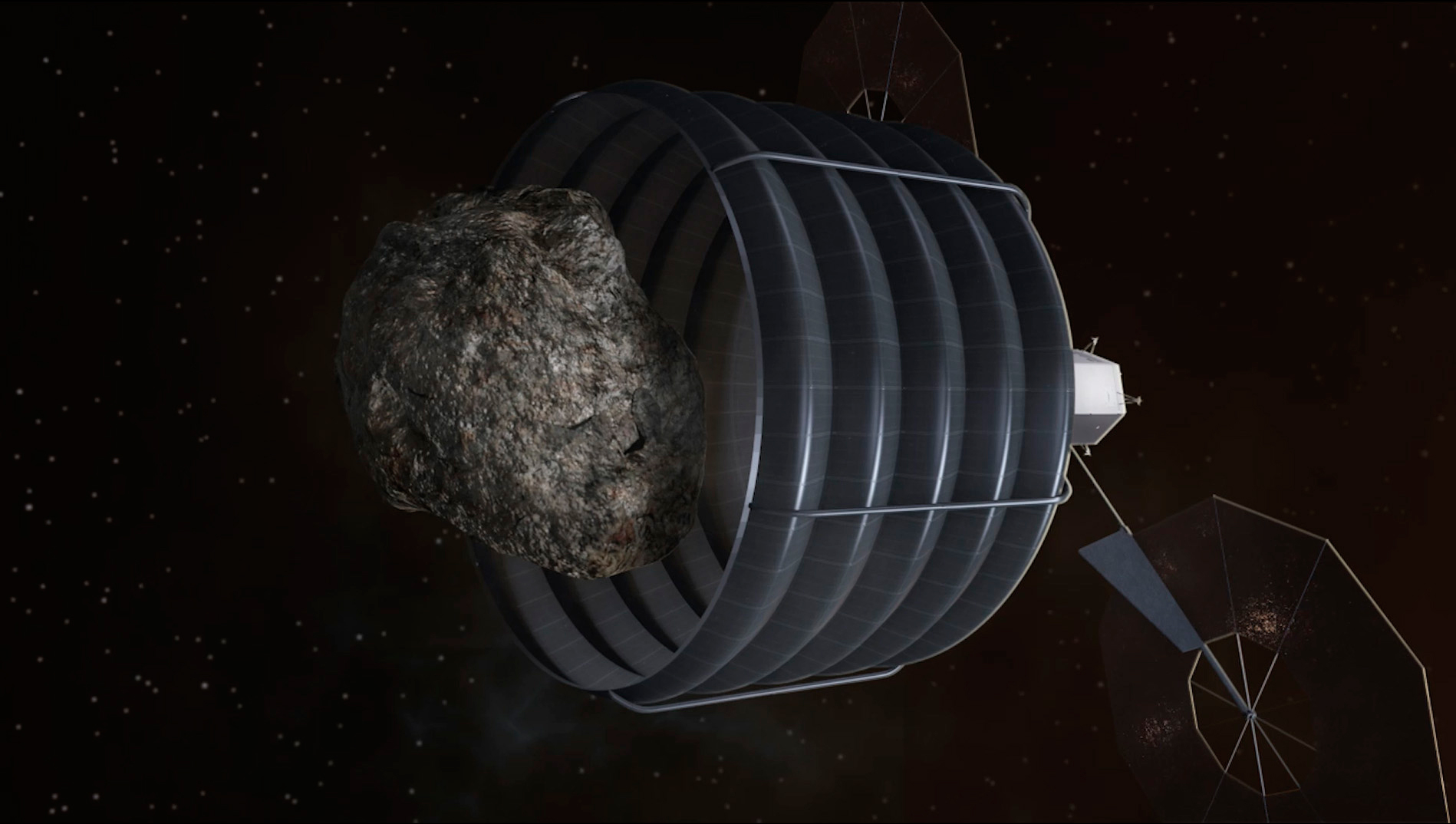
The 'Option A' was to deploy a container large enough to capture a free-flying asteroid up to 8 m (26 ft) in diameter.
