= Arm of Orion =

Arm of Orion, Orion's Arm or Orion Arm may refer to:

- Orion Arm, a spur-spiral arm of the Milky Way Galaxy, where the Earth is located
- Constellation of Orion's arm
- Orion's Arm or Orion's Arm Universe Project, a science fiction world building project established in 2000
- Orion-Asteroid Retrieval Mission (Orion-ARM), variant of the Asteroid Retrieval Mission using Orion
