= Asteroid laser ablation =

Proposed method for deflecting asteroids

Asteroid laser ablation is a proposed method for deflecting asteroids, involving the use of a laser array to alter the orbit of an asteroid. Laser ablation works by heating up a substance enough to allow gaseous material to eject, either through sublimation (solid to gas) or vaporization (liquid to gas). For most asteroids this process occurs between temperatures in the range of 2,700–3,000 K (2,430–2,730 °C; 4,400–4,940 °F). The ejecting material creates a thrust, which over an extended period of time can change the trajectory of the asteroid. As a proof of concept on a small scale, Travis Brashears, a researcher at UC Santa Barbara's Experimental Cosmology Lab, led by Dr. Philip Lubin, has already experimentally verified that laser ablation can de-spin and spin-up an asteroid.

== Necessity for asteroid deflection ==
Modern humans, or Homo sapiens, have existed for approximately 200,000 years. By comparison, the dinosaurs survived on Earth for over 100 million years before the Chixculub asteroid wiped them out. Asteroids could still potentially pose a serious threat to every major city on earth and even to our whole species.

=== Chelyabinsk meteor ===
In February 2013, the Chelyabinsk meteor exploded at a height of 30 kilometers over western Russia. The meteor, which weighed around 6.8 kilotonnes (15×10^{6} lb), was estimated to be traveling 18 km/s (40,000 mph) and entered Earth's atmosphere at an angle of 20 degrees. The explosion was between 20 and 30 times stronger than the bomb dropped on Hiroshima; the resulting shock wave broke windows on the ground and injured around 1,500 people. Owing to the meteor's relatively shallow angle, it exploded high in Earth's atmosphere. However, had the meteor reached Earth's surface or exploded lower in the atmosphere, the results could have been catastrophic.

=== Detection ===
Despite NASA's efforts to detect near-Earth objects (NEOs), the Chelyabinsk meteor went undetected. In recent years, NASA, in partnership with the European Space Agency, has been increasing its efforts to track all NEOs with the potential to cross Earth's orbit. On its website, NASA has a public list of all known NEOs that present a potential impact risk. However, the list remains incomplete and the question of what to do in the event of an imminent impact remains unanswered.

=== Politics of deflection ===
Laser ablation is a promising method because it allows an asteroid to be redirected without breaking the asteroid into smaller pieces, each of which may pose its own threat to Earth. The nuclear impactor is another proposed method for deflecting asteroids, but is less promising than laser ablation for both political and technical reasons:

- Blowing up an asteroid could create multiple smaller asteroid fragments, which could each be as destructive as the larger asteroid.
- Detonating an atomic bomb high up in Earth's atmosphere could produce unforeseen repercussions.
- The Outer Space Treaty is a cold war treaty signed in 1967 which prohibits weapons of mass destruction from being placed in space. It effectively blocks any research group from experimentally verifying the nuclear impactor method.

Laser ablation is already being experimentally tested in labs as a method for asteroid deflection and there are plans to begin testing on the International Space Station (ISS), and in low Earth orbit.

=== Asteroid impact avoidance ===
Short acting laser ablation is used to verify and explore the effectiveness of the powerful thermal X-ray pulse that would be emitted upon the detonation of an asteroid stand-off nuclear explosive device. Investigations to this end were conducted in 2015 by exposing common meteorite fragments to tuned laser pulses, provided by Sandia National Laboratory.

== In operation ==
1. A laser array is focused on the target asteroid.
2. The laser heats the surface of the asteroid to extremely high temperatures: 3,000 K (2,730 °C; 4,940 °F).
3. Material on the surface of the asteroid is ablated and ejected away from the asteroid.
4. Newton's third law states that for any action there is an equal and opposite reaction. As the material becomes a gas it is pushed away from the asteroid and by Newton's third law, it also pushes back on the asteroid with an equal force, called a thrust.
5. Newton's second law states that force is equal to mass times acceleration, or F=ma. Although the thrust on the asteroid is tiny in comparison to the asteroid's mass, by Newton's second law there will still be some small acceleration.
6. Over time the small acceleration on the asteroid significantly alters its trajectory. Once the asteroid is no longer on course to collide with Earth the laser can be removed.
7. Deflecting an asteroid using laser ablation will likely take between 1 and 10 years, depending on a number of factors.

== Proposed systems ==
There are two types of proposed asteroid laser ablation systems, a stand-on system and a stand-off system. The main difference is the size and position of the laser array used.

=== Stand-off system ===
A stand-off system is a large laser array which would orbit the Earth or possibly the moon. It would range from approximately the size of the ISS to around 10 times larger. The system would be able to deflect even the largest asteroids, which can be hundreds of kilometers across, and also ideally be able to target multiple asteroids at once if necessary. Although this system would be the most effective against a wide variety of threats, its size, and consequentially its cost, make it an unrealistic option for the near future. The implementation of this type of system would likely require the cooperation and collaboration of multiple governments and agencies.

=== Laser strength ===
A stronger laser can create a greater thrust on an asteroid. Researchers at UC Santa Barbara have experimentally simulated the time it would take to redirect a moderately sized asteroid using different strength lasers. The strongest lasers tested could hypothetically require under a year to redirect an asteroid a safe distance from the Earth, while the weakest lasers could take up to 10 years.

- The advantage of a weak laser is that requires less energy to power and, as a result, costs less than a higher powered laser.
- The benefit of a strong laser is that it doesn't depend upon our ability to predict impacts years in advance. Asteroids are difficult to track and impacts are even more difficult to predict; a strong laser ensures greater protection.

Choosing the optimal laser strength is a question of balancing the cost, energy use, and desired level of protection.

=== Power source ===
Typically such systems require substantial amounts of power. For space-based systems, this might require either some form of nuclear power, or power from a space-based solar power satellite. Many proponents of space-based solar power imagine one of the benefits of such an infrastructure includes the ability to divert asteroids and comets are alter their trajectory for exploitation via asteroid mining, as well as for laser-sail based interstellar propulsion.
