= Defensive weapon =

Defensive weapons include:

- Personal weapons - see Self-defense#Armed
- Missile defense
- Planetary defense weapons - see Asteroid impact avoidance
- Other means of neutralizing attacks - see Category:Weapons countermeasures
