= Space defense =

Space defense may refer to:

- Space warfare
- Asteroid-impact avoidance
- Alien invasion
