= Directed Energy System for Targeting of Asteroids and ExploRation =

Directed Energy System for Targeting of Asteroids and ExploRation (DE-STAR) is a proposed University of California Santa Barbara (UCSB) Experimental Cosmology Group experimental astrophysics group primarily focused on studies of the early universe and astrophysical applications of directed energy. They propose a system to deflect asteroids, comets, and other near-Earth objects (NEO) that pose a credible risk of impact. The objects that cross Earth's orbit, even relatively small ones, can still have a devastating effect. UCSB group proposes an orbital planetary defense system capable of heating the surface of potentially hazardous objects to the point of vaporization. DE-STAR is a modular phased array of kilowatt class lasers powered by photovoltaics, see directed energy weapon.

The same UCSB Experimental Cosmology group also proposed using the system as a method of propelling small spacecraft to 0.4% of the speed of light.
