= Asteroid Redirect Mission =

2013–2017 proposed NASA space mission

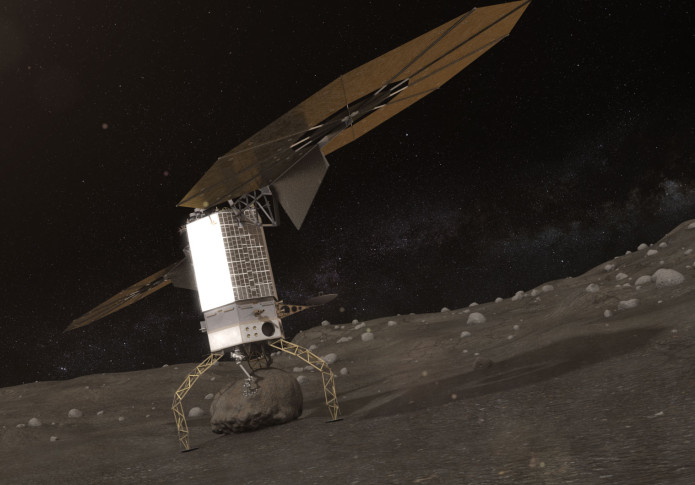
Grippers on the end of the robotic arms grasp and secure a boulder from a large asteroid. With the boulder secured, the legs would push off to provide an initial ascent without the use of thrusters.

Asteroid Redirect Mission (ARM), also known as the Asteroid Retrieval and Utilization (ARU) mission and the Asteroid Initiative, was a space mission proposed by NASA in 2013; the mission was later cancelled. The Asteroid Retrieval Robotic Mission (ARRM) spacecraft would have rendezvoused with a large near-Earth asteroid and used robotic arms with anchoring grippers to retrieve a 4-meter boulder from the asteroid and bring it to lunar orbit.

The spacecraft would have characterized the asteroid and demonstrated at least one planetary defense technique before transporting the boulder to a stable lunar orbit, where it could have been further analyzed both by robotic probes and by a future crewed mission, Asteroid Redirect Crewed Mission (ARCM). If funded, the mission would have launched in December 2021, with the additional objectives to test a number of new capabilities needed for future human expeditions to deep space, including advanced ion thrusters.

The proposed 2018 NASA budget called for its cancellation, the mission was given its notice of defunding in April 2017, and NASA announced the "close out" on June 13, 2017. Key technologies being developed for ARM have continued, especially the ion thruster propulsion system that would have been flown on the robotic mission.

== Objectives ==
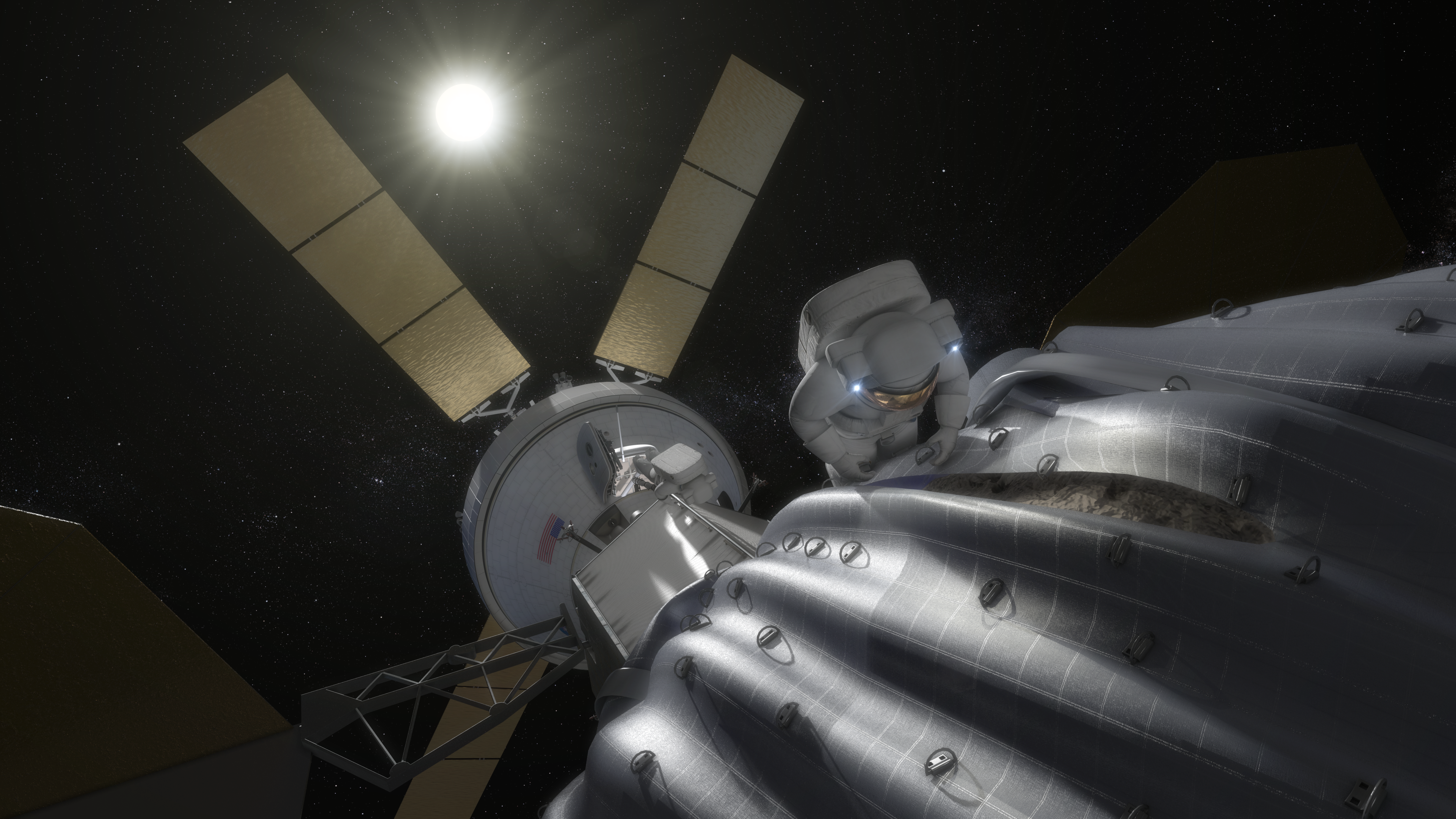
Astronaut on EVA to take asteroid samples, Orion in the background

The main objective of the Asteroid Redirect Mission was to develop deep space exploration capabilities needed in preparation for a human mission to Mars and other Solar System destinations per NASA's Journey to Mars flexible pathways.

=== Mars precursor ===
Slow cargo missions by space tugs for Mars logistics could reduce costs by as much as 60% (if using advanced solar electric propulsion (ion engines)) and reduce overall mission risk by enabling on-site check-out of critical systems before the crew departs by quicker transport.

Not only could the solar electric propulsion technologies and designs be applied to future missions, but the ARRM spacecraft could be left in a stable orbit for reuse. The project baselined multiple refueling capabilities; the asteroid-specific payload would have been at one end of the bus for possible removal and replacement via future servicing or as a separable spacecraft, leaving a qualified space tug in cislunar space.

=== Expanded and sustainable deep space operations ===
The robotic and crewed missions would have demonstrated capabilities past Earth orbit, yet within a few days' return contingency. Lunar Distant Retrograde Orbit (DRO) encompassing Earth-Moon L1 and L2, is essentially a node for Earth system escape and capture. This is more so if an Exploration Augmentation Module (EAM) is brought for extended human stays, possibly by an ARRM-like SEP module. On its return leg from Mars, a human mission may save tons in mass by capturing into DRO and transferring to a parked Orion for Earth return and re-entry.

=== Additional objectives ===
A secondary objective was to develop the required technology to bring a small near-Earth asteroid into lunar orbit – "the asteroid was a bonus." There, it could've been analyzed by the crew of the Orion EM-5 or EM-6 ARCM mission in 2026.

Additional mission aims included demonstrating planetary defense techniques able to protect the Earth in the future – such as using robotic spacecraft to deflect potentially hazardous asteroids. Under consideration for deflecting an asteroid were: grabbing the asteroid and directly moving it, as well as employing gravity tractor techniques after collecting a boulder from its surface to increase mass ("enhanced gravity tractor").

The mission would have also tested the performance of advanced solar electric propulsion (ion engines) and broad-band laser communication in space. These new technologies could help send the large amounts of cargo, habitats, and propellant to Mars in advance of a human mission to Mars and/or Phobos.

NASA Asteroid Redirect Mission
The asteroid redirect vehicle would have demonstrated the "gravity tractor" planetary defense technique on a hazardous-size asteroid. This method leverages the mass of the spacecraft (18 tons) and its 6m boulder cargo (at least 20 tons) to impart a gravitational force on the asteroid, slowly altering the asteroid's trajectory. (ogv; gif)

== Spacecraft overview ==
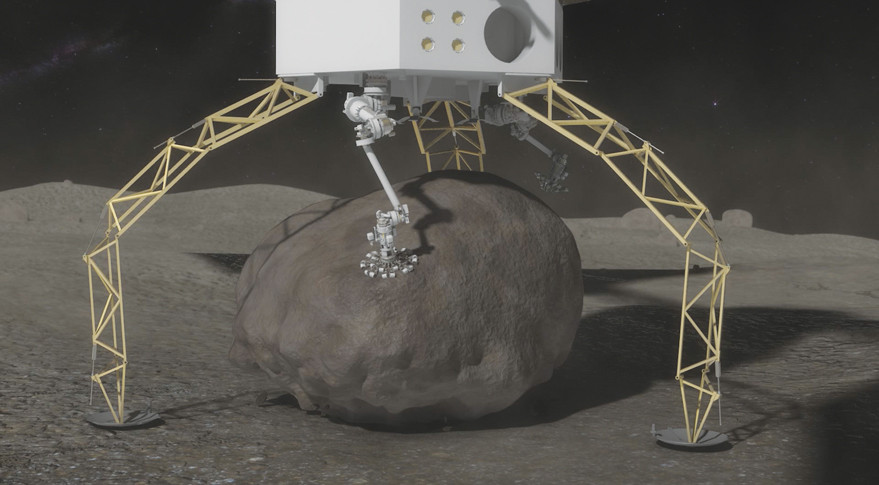
Asteroid grippers on the end of the robotic arms grasp and secure a 6 m boulder from a large asteroid. An integrated drill provides final anchoring of the boulder to the capture mechanism.

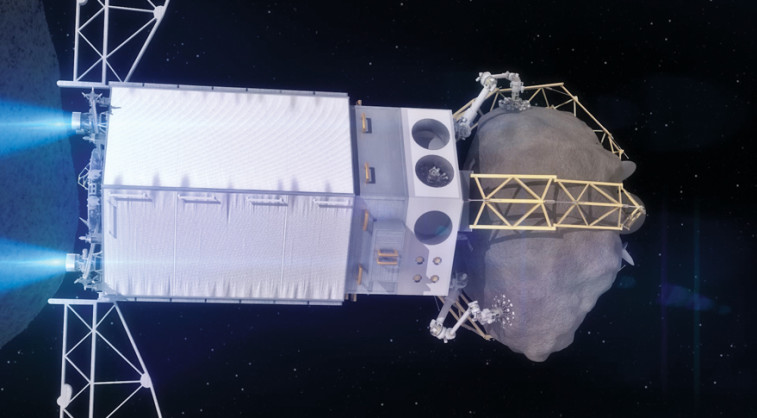
Rendering of the Asteroid Redirect Vehicle departing the asteroid after capturing a boulder from its surface

The vehicle would land on a large asteroid and grippers on the end of the robotic arms would grasp and secure a boulder from the surface of a large asteroid. The grippers would dig into the boulder and create a strong grip. An integrated drill would be used to provide final anchoring of the boulder to the capture mechanism. Once the boulder is secured, the legs would push off and provide an initial ascent without the use of thrusters.

=== Propulsion ===
The spacecraft would be propelled by advanced solar electric propulsion (SEP) (possibly a Hall-effect thruster, a type of ion thruster). Electricity would be provided by high efficiency UltraFlex-style solar panels (50 kW).

The advanced ion engine uses 10% of the propellant required by equivalent chemical rockets, it can process three times the power of previous designs, and increase efficiency by 50%. It would use the Hall effect, which provides low acceleration but can fire continuously for many years to thrust a large mass to high speed. Hall effect thrusters trap electrons in a magnetic field and use them to ionize the onboard xenon gas propellant. The magnetic field also generates an electric field that accelerates the charged ions creating an exhaust plume of plasma that pushes the spacecraft forward. The spacecraft concept would have a dry mass of 5.5 tons, and could store up to 13 tons of xenon propellant.

Each thruster would have a 30- to 50-kilowatt power level, and several thrusters can be combined to increase the power of an SEP spacecraft. This engine, which is scalable to 300 kilowatts and beyond, is being researched and developed by Northrop Grumman with Sandia National Laboratories and the University of Michigan. NASA Glenn Research Center is managing the project.

Even at a destination, the SEP system can be configured to provide power to maintain the systems or prevent propellant boil-off before the crew arrives. However, existing flight-qualified solar-electric propulsion is at levels of 1–5 kW. A Mars cargo mission would require ~100 kW, and a crewed flight ~150–300 kW.

== Proposed timeline ==
Originally planned for 2017, then 2020, and then for December 2021. The mission was given its notice of defunding in April 2017. The launch vehicle would have been either a Delta IV Heavy, SLS or Falcon Heavy. The boulder would have arrived in lunar orbit by late 2025.

== Target asteroid ==
By October 2017, there were 16,950 known near-Earth asteroids, having been discovered by various search teams and catalogued as potentially hazardous objects. By early 2017 NASA had yet to select a target for ARM, but for planning and simulation purposes, the near-Earth asteroid (341843) 2008 EV5 was used as an example for the spacecraft to pick up a single 4 m (13 ft) boulder from it. Other candidate parent asteroids were Itokawa, Bennu, and Ryugu.

The carbonaceous boulder that would have been captured by the mission (maximum 6 meter diameter, 20 tons) is too small to harm the Earth because it would burn up in the atmosphere. Redirecting the asteroid mass to a distant retrograde orbit around the Moon would ensure it could not hit Earth and also leave it in a stable orbit for future studies.

== History ==
NASA Administrator Robert Frosch testified to Congress on "asteroid retrieval to Earth" in July 1980. However, he stated that it was infeasible at the time.

The ARU mission, excluding any human missions to an asteroid which it may enable, was the subject of a feasibility study in 2012 by the Keck Institute for Space Studies. The mission cost was estimated by the Glenn Research Center at about $2.6 billion, of which $105 million was funded in 2014 to mature the concept. NASA officials emphasized that ARM was intended as one step in the long-term plans for a human mission to Mars.

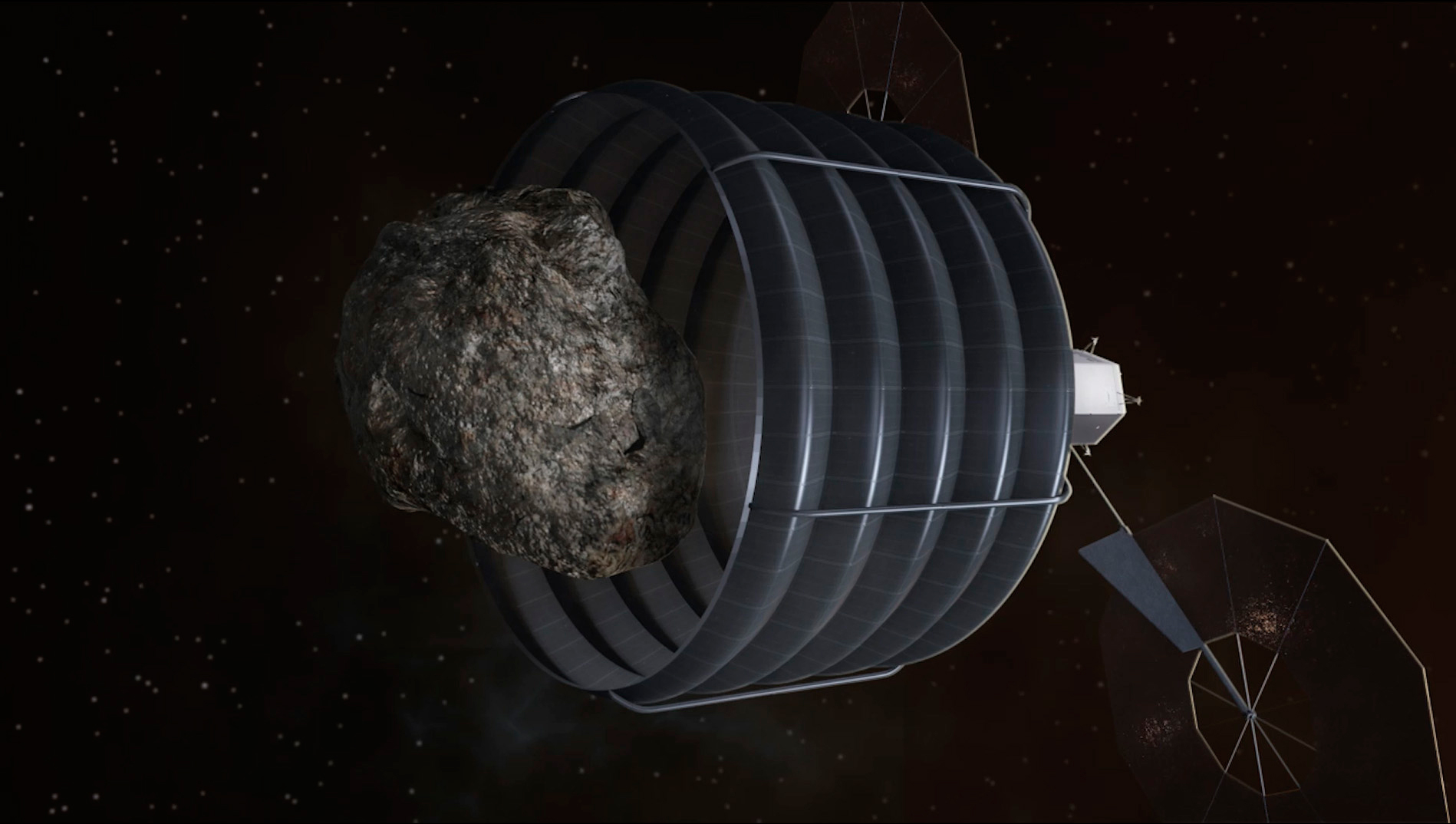
The 'Option A' was to deploy a container large enough to capture a free-flying asteroid up to 8 m (26 ft) in diameter.

The two options studied to retrieve a small asteroid were Option A and Option B. Option A would deploy a large 15-metre (50 ft) capture bag capable of holding a small asteroid up to 8 m (26 ft) in diameter, and a mass of up to 500 tons. Option B, which was selected in March 2015, would have the vehicle land on a large asteroid and deploy robotic arms to lift up a boulder up to 4 m (13 ft) in diameter from the surface, transport it and place it into lunar orbit. This option was identified as more relevant to future rendezvous, autonomous docking, lander, sampler, planetary defense, mining, and spacecraft servicing technologies.

The crewed portion to retrieve asteroid samples from the Moon orbit (Orion EM-3) was criticized as an unnecessary part of the mission with claims that thousands of meteorites have already been analyzed and that the technology used to retrieve one boulder does not help develop a crewed mission to Mars. The plans were not changed despite the NASA Advisory Council suggested on April 10, 2015 that NASA should not carry out its plans for ARM, and should instead develop solar electric propulsion and use it to power a spacecraft on a round-trip flight to Mars.

In January 2016 contracts were awarded by NASA's Jet Propulsion Laboratory (JPL) for design studies for a solar electric propulsion-based spacecraft. The robotic ARRM mission would have been the first phase of ARM. The contracts were won by Lockheed Martin Space Systems, Littleton, Colorado; Boeing Phantom Works, Huntington Beach, California; Orbital ATK, Dulles, Virginia; and Space Systems/Loral, Palo Alto, California.

In May 2016, ASI (the Italian Space Agency) agreed to a joint study, and possible Italian participation.

Under the 2018 NASA budget proposed by the Trump administration in March 2017, this mission was cancelled in favor of the Artemis program. On June 13, 2017 NASA announced a "closeout phase" following the defund. NASA has emphasized that key technologies being developed for ARM will continue, especially the solar electric propulsion system, which would have been flown on the robotic mission, which was initially repurposed to be used on the Lunar Gateway before being repurposed again for the Space Reactor‑1 Freedom as the Power and Propulsion Element.

== See also ==
- Asteroid capture – Orbital insertion of an asteroid around a larger planetary body
- Asteroid impact avoidance – Methods to prevent destructive asteroid hits
- Near-Earth object#Near-Earth asteroids – Small Solar System body with an orbit that can bring it close to Earth
- Potentially hazardous object – Hazardous near-Earth asteroid or comet
- Double Asteroid Redirection Test – 2021 NASA planetary defense mission
