= (341843) 2008 EV5 =

Aten asteroid

(341843) 2008 EV_{5}
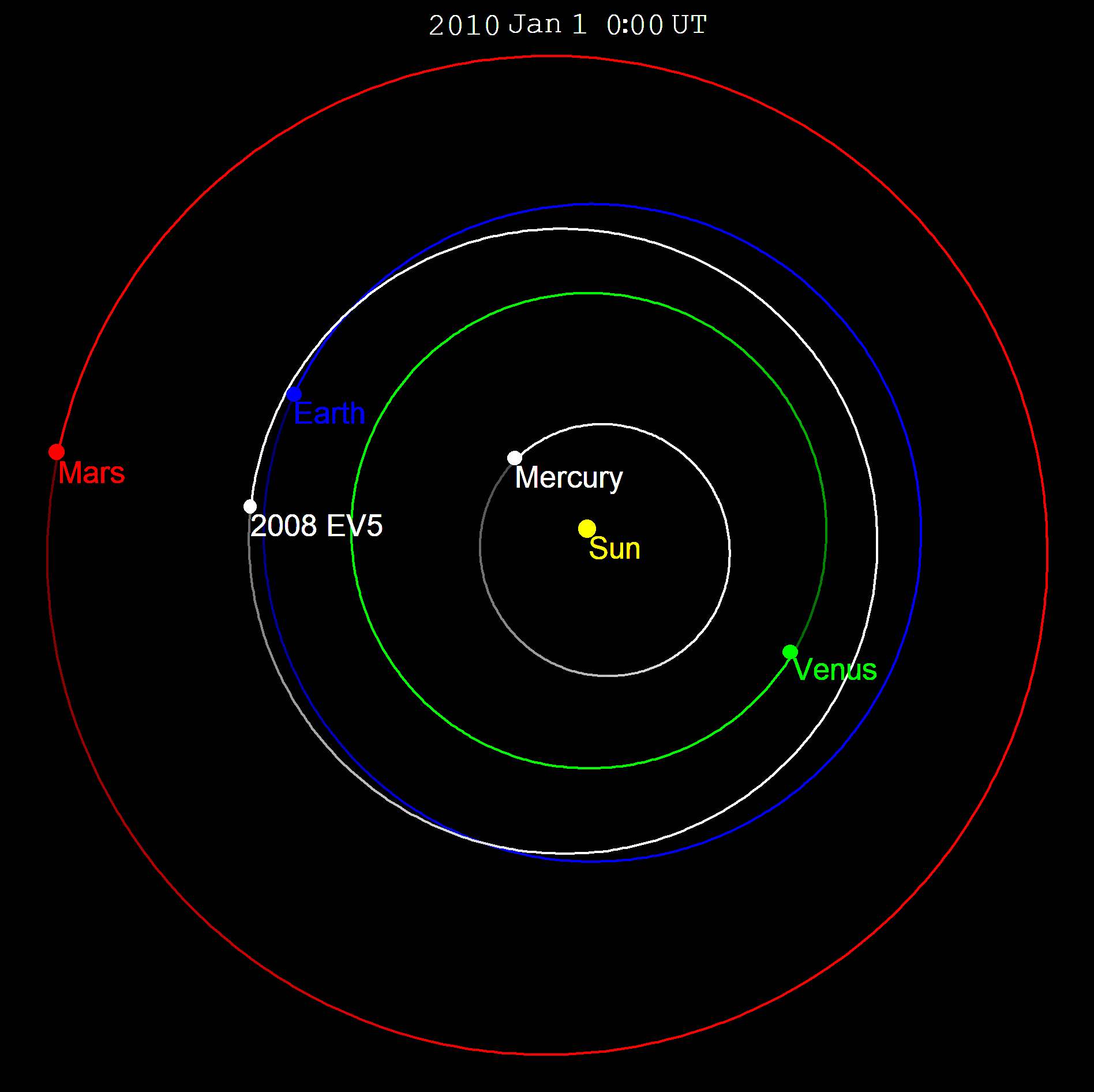
- Diagram of 2008 EV_{5}'s Earth-crossing orbit

Discovery
- Discovered by: Mount Lemmon Srvy.
- Discovery site: Mount Lemon Obs.
- Discovery date: 4 March 2008

Designations
- Minor planet category: NEO · Aten · PHA

Orbital characteristics
- Epoch 4 September 2017 (JD 2458000.5)
- Uncertainty parameter 1
- Observation arc: 2.10 yr (768 days)
- Aphelion: 1.0383 AU
- Perihelion: 0.8783 AU
- Semi-major axis: 0.9583 AU
- Eccentricity: 0.0835
- Orbital period (sidereal): 0.94 yr (343 days)
- Mean anomaly: 213.55°
- Mean motion: 1° 3^{m} 2.16^{s} / day
- Inclination: 7.4368°
- Longitude of ascending node: 93.390°
- Argument of perihelion: 234.81°
- Earth MOID: 0.0149 AU (5.8 LD)

Physical characteristics
- Dimensions: (420 × 410 × 390) m
- Mean diameter: 0.370±0.006 km 0.400±0.014 km 0.400±0.034 km 0.400±0.050 km
- Synodic rotation period: 3.717±0.008 h 3.725 h 3.7255±0.002 h 7.2 h 10.200±0.002 h
- Geometric albedo: 0.104±0.312; 0.12±0.04; 0.13±0.05; 0.137±0.013; 0.1373±0.0129
- Spectral type: X · C · S (assumed)
- Absolute magnitude (H): 19.7 · 19.91 · 20.0 · 20.0±0.4

(341843) 2008 EV_{5} is a sub-kilometer asteroid, classified as a near-Earth object and potentially hazardous asteroid of the Aten group, approximately 400 metres (1,300 feet) in diameter. It was discovered on 4 March 2008, by astronomers of the Mount Lemmon Survey at Mount Lemmon Observatory near Tucson, Arizona, United States.

== Origin and orbital history ==
2008 EV_{5} started its existence as part of a much larger body in the asteroid belt, with a likely diameter greater than 100 kilometers. 2008 EV_{5}'s immediate history likely started when its parent body experienced a large cratering event or, more likely, a catastrophic disruption event that resulted in a highly fractured, shattered, or reaccumulated object (rubble pile). As a result, 2008 EV_{5} may have been produced as a reassembly of ejected fragments. The location of what is now 2008 EV_{5} within this parent body is unknown.

Given the available modeling work and data, the most plausible source family candidates for 2008 EV_{5} are Eulalia, New Polana, and Erigone. This assumes that 2008 EV_{5}'s true albedo is considerably lower than 10%. If it does have a high albedo, a plausible source would be a population of high-albedo C-type asteroids in the inner asteroid belt. Second tier candidate families for the high-albedo case are Baptistina and Pallas.

From here, the newly liberated 2008 EV_{5} began to change via the forces referred to as the Yarkovsky and YORP effects. The Yarkovsky effect describes a small force that affects orbital motion. It is caused by sunlight; when objects heat up in the Sun, they reradiate the energy away as heat, which in turn creates a tiny thrust. This recoil acceleration is much weaker than solar and planetary gravitational forces, but it can produce substantial orbital changes over timescales ranging from many millions to billions of years. The same physical phenomenon also creates a thermal torque that probably caused 2008 EV_{5} to take on a top-like appearance.

Dynamical models indicate that 2008 EV_{5} migrated inward across the inner asteroid belt over long timescales (i.e. the order of ~0.01–1 Gyr) until it reached a planetary gravitational resonance that drove it into the near-Earth asteroid (NEA) population over a timescale of the order of ~1 Myr. From there, gravitational interactions with both the planets and resonances allowed it to reach its current orbit within a few Myr to a few tens of Myr.

== Close approaches ==
On 23 December 2008, 2008 EV_{5} made a close approach to Earth at a distance of 8.4 lunar distances (0.022 AU, 3.2 million km), its closest until 2169. Its brightness peaked on 26 December about 13.2 magnitude.

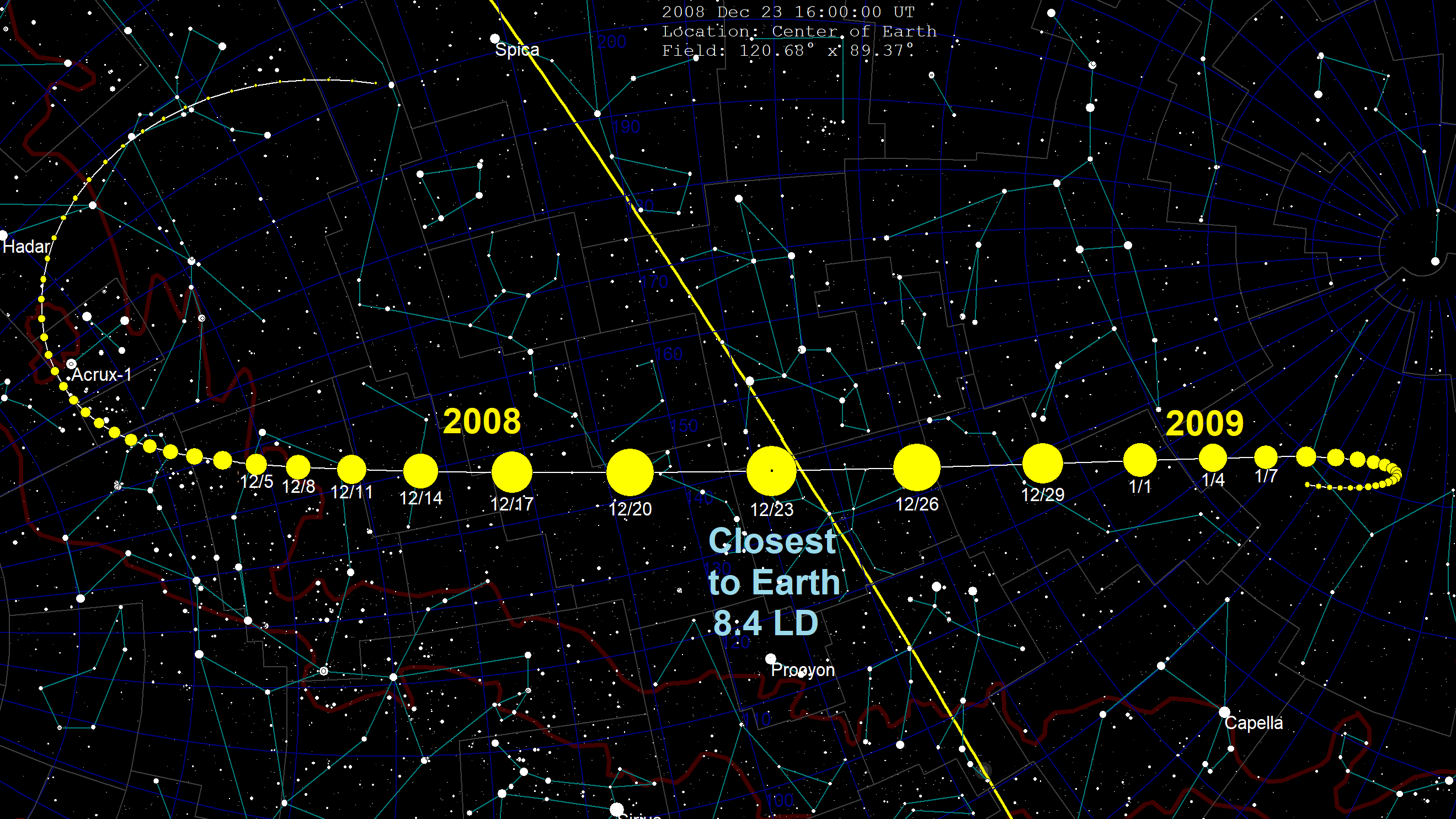
2008 Path of 2008 EV_{5} close approach, with 3 day motion markers

Earth Approach on 20 December 2023
Date	JPL Horizons nominal geocentric distance (AU)	uncertainty region (3-sigma)
2023-Dec-20 06:52	0.04226 AU (6.322 million km)	±1741 km

== Physical characteristics ==
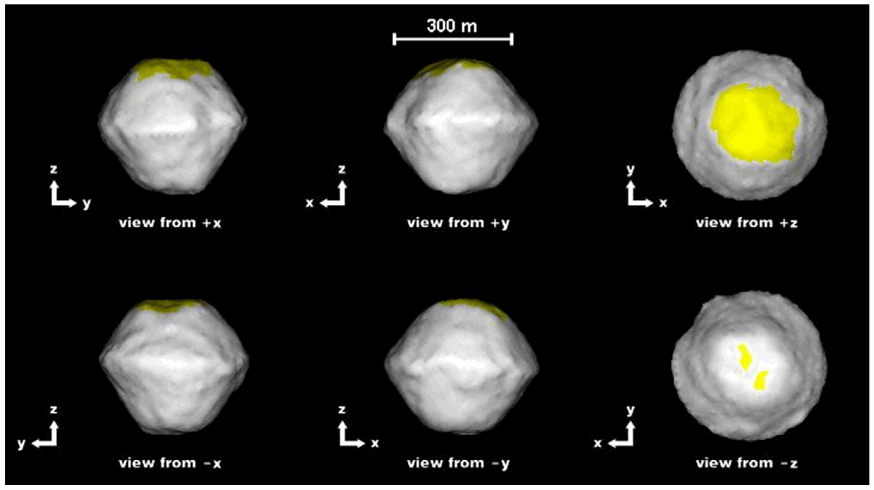
Radar-based shape model of 2008 EV_{5}

2008 EV_{5} is an oblate spheroid (also described as "muffin-shaped") 400 m (1,300 ft) in diameter. It rotates very slowly in a retrograde direction. There is a 150 m (490 ft) diameter concave feature, possibly an impact crater, or a relic feature from a previous episode of rapid rotation that caused the asteroid's shape to reconfigure.

Visible and near-infrared spectroscopy show that 2008 EV_{5}'s composition is similar to that of carbonaceous chondrite meteorites.

== Proposed sample return mission ==
2008 EV_{5} was the preliminary baseline target of NASA's proposed sample-return Asteroid Redirect Mission. Besides 2008 EV_{5}, several other asteroids, including Itokawa and Bennu, were considered for this mission, before its cancellation in 2017.

== See also ==
- Asteroid Redirect Mission
- List of minor planets: 341001–342000
