= Hypervelocity Asteroid Intercept Vehicle =

Spacecraft for deflecting dangerous NEOs

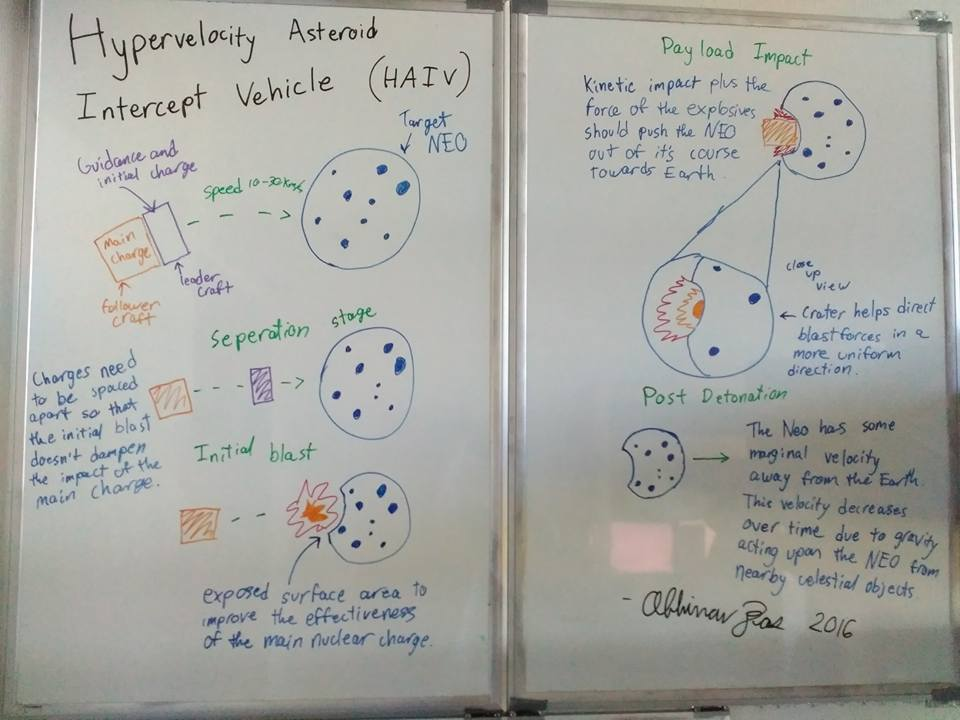
What an HAIV might do during a mission.

A Hypervelocity Asteroid Intercept Vehicle (HAIV) is a spacecraft being developed by NASA to deflect dangerous Near Earth objects (NEOs) such as comets and asteroids that threaten colliding with Earth. The vehicle is intended to use powerful explosives, such as nuclear bombs, to deflect the NEO by detonating on the surface, thus changing its trajectory to miss Earth. This method of asteroid impact avoidance is intended to be used on dangerous NEOs detected within a short time frame (less than 5 years) before a possible impact event with Earth. The idea came about when asteroid detection improved. Since then, scientists and engineers have sketched a design for an HAIV.

== History ==
Over the years, certain events brought up the idea of planetary defense from NEOs. These events lead to the development of the HAIV that NASA intends to use.

=== Project Icarus ===
In 1967, Professor Paul Sandorff at the Massachusetts Institute of Technology asked his graduate students to come up with a plan to deflect 1566 Icarus, an asteroid about 1 km wide. An asteroid was observed to have an orbit bringing it into a close approach pass by Earth in the coming year, curiosity however motivated Sandorff to task his students to come up with a solution to the thought-experiment 'what if it were on an impact trajectory?'

As the students knew nothing about the density and spin rate of the asteroid at the time, the team needed to propose a deflection solution that would not be held back by these unknowns. Eventually the team landed upon a conservative mission architecture that would work with 73 days remaining until impact. It consisted of launching a repeated series of the Saturn V rocket vehicle then under development, to deliver 6 to 7 somewhat hypothetical 100-megaton nuclear explosive devices which would detonate about "50 to 100 feet" in proximity to the asteroids surface. The first explosive Saturn-Icarus 1 physics package would arrive at the asteroid with 13 days before Earth-impact remaining, the second Saturn-Icarus 2, arriving with 10 days remaining and so on.

It is reported that analysis by Sandorff of the Project Icarus study, with an unspecified criteria and with the use of then estimated Saturn V launch success rates, that the project had a 71% chance of completely protecting the Earth and an 86% chance of reducing the damage a full impact would cause. Though Project Icarus was never tested, it laid the foundation for future research on nuclear explosive device deflection techniques.

=== Chelyabinsk meteor ===
In 2013, a meteor about 30 meters in diameter and weighing about 13,000 metric tons had an impact event over Russia. Once in Earth's lower atmosphere it burned up and exploded. This relatively small meteor damaged over 7200 buildings and injured over 1400 people. It brought renewed attention towards asteroid defense. The NASA Suomi NPP satellite was able to track the plume afterwards, giving scientists more data on asteroids.

== Design ==
After detecting many of the asteroids in the Solar System and observing their composition through meteorite remains, NASA has identified multiple large asteroids that may collide with Earth. To combat these NEOs, NASA has come up with the following design for an HAIV. The vehicle is split into two major parts; the leader craft and the follower craft.

=== Leader craft ===
The leader craft is initially attached to the follower craft, but before impact the two craft are spread out by an extendable pillar known as the AstroMast Boom. Furthermore, it contains the primary guidance systems including normal cameras and Lidar (light based radar). The purpose of this craft is to make an initial crater in the target NEO where the follower craft may detonate in. Doing this helps direct the explosive energy of the follower craft, hopefully applying enough force to change the orbit of the NEO.

=== Follower craft ===
The follower craft contains the following:

- Solar panels and batteries to power both the follower and leader craft.
- A large antenna and communication electronics to relay information back to Earth.
- A camera to check on the status of the leader craft.
- The NED (nuclear explosive device) that detonates upon impact with the NEO.
- Thrusters and fuel tanks to help the vehicle to travel towards the target NEO.
- Other support systems and fail safes in the case of a malfunction.

Once the leader craft impacts the NEO and makes a crater, the follower craft detonates its NED soon after. It also relays back whether the detonation was a success or failure which can be confirmed by observation from the Earth.

== Obstacles ==
There are numerous factors that have slowed the development of the HAIV. These include but aren't limited to budget, law, and irregular NEOs.

=== Budget ===
Initial test missions have cost between US$600 million to $1.8 billion, to test the feasibility of the guidance. A full mission may cost much more than this amount, especially in the case of a NEO detected with a short time till collision with Earth. With recent cuts to NASA's funding, it is unsure whether an HAIV mission will ever occur.

=== Law ===
The use of nuclear explosive devices is an international issue and will need to be addressed by the United Nations Committee on the Peaceful Uses of Outer Space. The 1996 Comprehensive Nuclear-Test-Ban Treaty technically bans nuclear weapons in space. However it is unlikely that a nuclear explosive device, fuzed to be detonated only upon interception with a threatening celestial object, with the sole intent of preventing that celestial body from impacting Earth would be regarded as an un-peaceful use of space, or that the explosive device sent to mitigate an Earth impact, explicitly designed to prevent harm to come to life would fall under the classification of a "weapon".

=== Irregular NEOs ===
Sometimes NEOs are difficult to track. They could have an irregular orbit or be spinning, making it hard for the leader craft to make an initial crater. If the HAIV doesn't make proper contact, the NEO's orbit may not change and go on to collide with Earth. NASA is currently working out how to combat this problem for the HAIV, in contrast the project Icarus technique of MIT would not be hindered by these complications.

== See also ==
MW-1#STABO – A chemical explosive, runway cratering munition, with a similar 2 stage operating mechanism.
