= Asteroid impact avoidance =

Methods to prevent destructive asteroid hits

Kinetic impactors such as the one used by the Double Asteroid Redirection Test – its impact with the asteroid moon Dimorphos photographed above – are one of many methods, designed to alter the trajectory of an asteroid to prevent its potential collision with Earth.

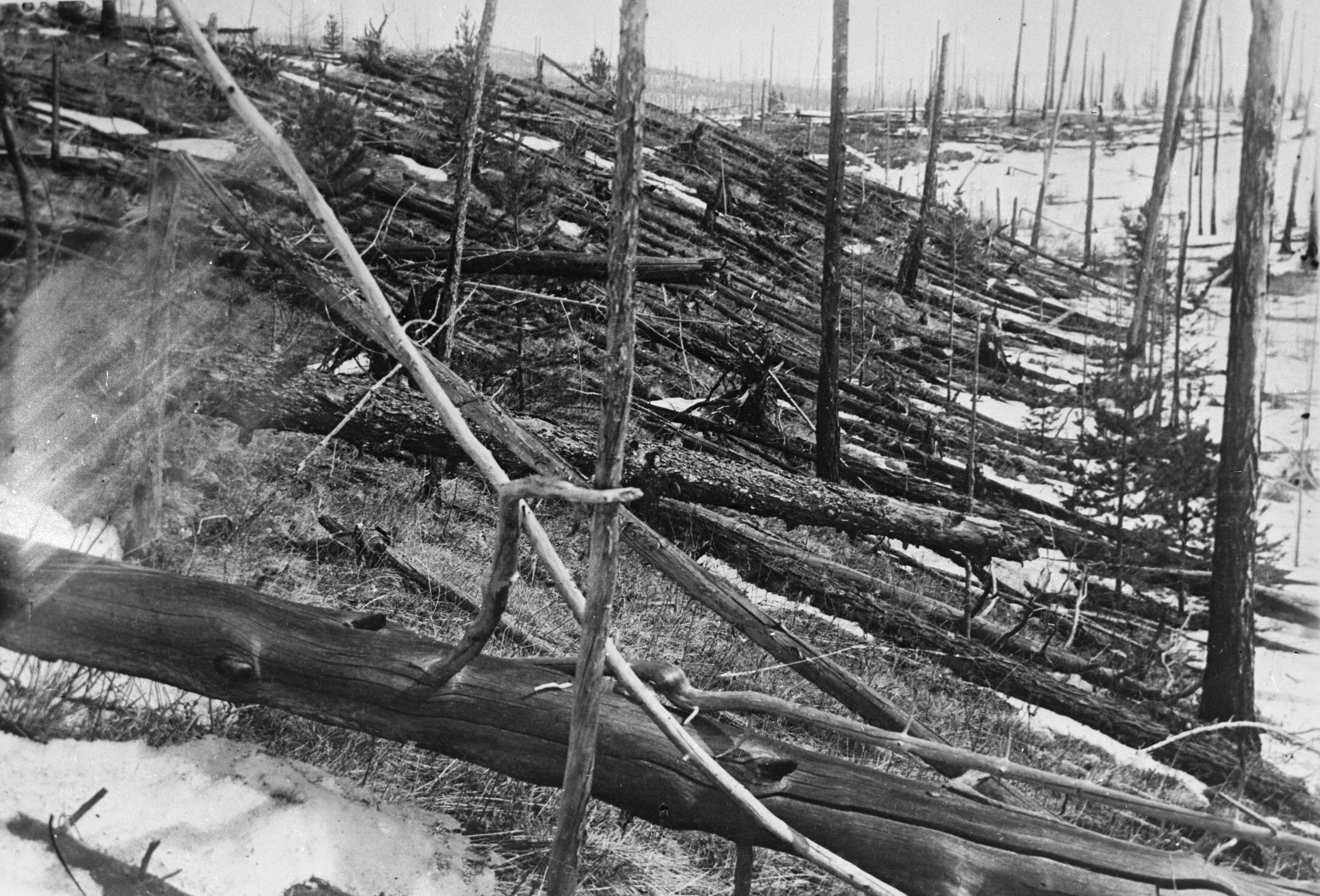
Damage caused by the Tunguska event. The object was 50–80 meters (160–260 ft) across and exploded 6–10 km (3.7–6.2 mi) above the surface; its explosion flattened 30 million trees and shattered windows hundreds of kilometers away.

Asteroid impact avoidance encompasses the methods by which near-Earth objects (NEO) on a potential collision course with Earth could be diverted, preventing destructive impact events. An impact by a sufficiently large asteroid or other NEOs would cause, depending on its impact location, massive tsunamis or multiple firestorms, and an impact winter caused by the sunlight-blocking effect of large quantities of pulverized rock dust and other debris placed into the stratosphere. A collision 66 million years ago between the Earth and an object approximately 10 kilometers (6 miles) wide is thought to have produced the Chicxulub crater and triggered the Cretaceous–Paleogene extinction event that the scientific community understands to have caused the extinction of all non-avian dinosaurs.

While the chances of a major collision are low in the near term, it is a near-certainty that one will happen eventually unless defensive measures are taken. Astronomical events—such as the Shoemaker-Levy 9 impacts on Jupiter and the 2013 Chelyabinsk meteor, along with the growing number of near-Earth objects discovered and catalogued on the Sentry Risk Table—have drawn renewed attention to such threats. The popularity of the 2021 movie Don't Look Up helped to raise awareness of the possibility of avoiding NEOs. Awareness of the threat has grown rapidly during the past few decades, but much more needs to be accomplished before the human population can feel adequately protected from a potentially catastrophic asteroid impact.

In 2016, a NASA scientist warned that the Earth is unprepared for such an event. In April 2018, the B612 Foundation reported "It's 100 percent certain we'll be hit by a devastating asteroid, but we're not 100 percent sure when." Also in 2018, physicist Stephen Hawking, in his final book, Brief Answers to the Big Questions, considered an asteroid collision to be the biggest threat to the planet.

Several ways of avoiding an asteroid impact have been described. There are two primary ways: to modify the trajectory of the object so that it does not collide with the Earth, or to modify the object by breaking it up so that the resulting fragments do not collide with the Earth or their smaller size reduces the subsequent hazard posed to the Earth.

Nonetheless, in March 2019, scientists reported that asteroids may be much more difficult to destroy than thought earlier. An asteroid may reassemble itself due to gravity after being disrupted. In May 2021, NASA astronomers reported that 5 to 10 years of preparation may be needed to avoid a virtual impactor based on a simulated exercise conducted by the 2021 Planetary Defense Conference.

In 2022, NASA spacecraft DART impacted Dimorphos, reducing the minor-planet moon's orbital period by 32 minutes. This mission constitutes the first successful attempt at asteroid deflection. In 2027, China plans to launch a deflection mission to the near-Earth object 2015 XF261, with the impact estimated to occur in April 2029.

== Deflection efforts ==
Known Near-Earth objects – as of January 2018 Video (0:55; July 23, 2018) (Earth's orbit in white)

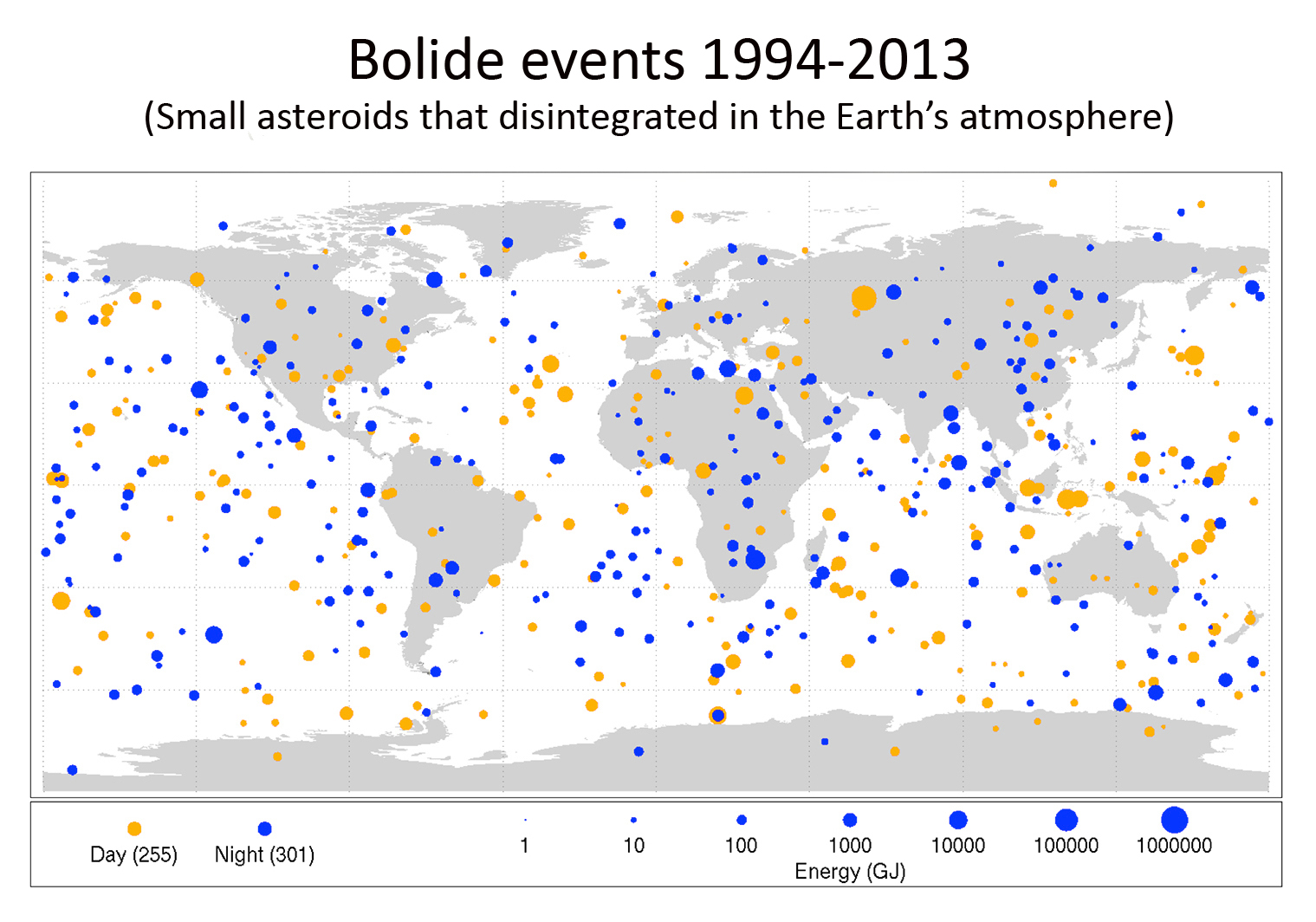
Frequency of small asteroids roughly 1 to 20 meters in diameter impacting Earth's atmosphere.

According to expert testimony in the United States Congress in 2013, NASA would require at least five years of preparation before a mission to intercept an asteroid could be launched. In June 2018, the US National Science and Technology Council warned that the United States was unprepared for an asteroid impact event, and developed and released the "National Near-Earth Object Preparedness Strategy Action Plan" to better prepare.

Most deflection efforts for a large object require from a year to decades of warning, allowing time to prepare and carry out a collision-avoidance project, as no known planetary defense hardware has yet been developed. It has been estimated that a velocity change of just $\frac{.035}{t} \text{m/s}$ (where $t$ is the number of years until potential impact) is needed to successfully deflect a body on a direct collision trajectory. Thus for a large number of years before impact, much smaller velocity changes are needed. For example, it was estimated there was a high chance of 99942 Apophis swinging by Earth in 2029 with a 10^{−4} probability of returning on an impact trajectory in 2035 or 2036. It was then determined that a deflection from this potential return trajectory, several years before the swing-by, could be achieved with a velocity change on the order of 10^{−6} m/s.

NASA's Double Asteroid Redirection Test (DART), the world's first full-scale mission to test technology for defending Earth against potential asteroid or comet hazards, launched on a SpaceX Falcon 9 rocket from Space Launch Complex 4 East at Vandenberg Space Force Base in California.

An impact by a 10-kilometer (6 mi) asteroid on the Earth has historically caused an extinction-level event due to catastrophic damage to the biosphere. There is also the threat from comets entering the inner Solar System. The impact speed of a long-period comet would likely be several times greater than that of a near-Earth asteroid, making its impact much more destructive; in addition, the warning time is unlikely to be more than a few months. Impacts from objects as small as 50 meters (160 ft) in diameter, which are far more common, are historically extremely destructive regionally (see Barringer crater).

Finding out the material composition of the object is also helpful before deciding which strategy is appropriate. Missions like the 2005 Deep Impact probe and the Rosetta spacecraft, have provided valuable information on what to expect. In October 2022, a method of mapping the insides of a potentially problematic asteroid in order to determine the best area for impact was proposed.

=== History of US government mandates ===
Efforts in asteroid impact prediction have concentrated on the survey method. The 1992 NASA-sponsored Near-Earth-Object Interception Workshop hosted by Los Alamos National Laboratory evaluated issues involved in intercepting celestial objects that could hit Earth. In a 1992 report to NASA, a coordinated Spaceguard Survey was recommended to discover, verify and provide follow-up observations for Earth-crossing asteroids. This survey was expected to discover 90% of these objects larger than one kilometer within 25 years. Three years later, another NASA report recommended search surveys that would discover 60–70% of short-period, near-Earth objects larger than one kilometer within ten years and obtain 90% completeness within five more years.

In 1998, NASA formally embraced the goal of finding and cataloging, by 2008, 90% of all near-Earth objects (NEOs) with diameters of 1 km or larger that could represent a collision risk to Earth. The 1 km diameter metric was chosen after considerable study indicated that an impact of an object smaller than 1 km could cause significant local or regional damage but is unlikely to cause a worldwide catastrophe. The impact of an object much larger than 1 km diameter could well result in worldwide damage up to, and potentially including, extinction of the human species. The NASA commitment has resulted in the funding of a number of NEO search efforts, which made considerable progress toward the 90% goal by 2008. However the 2009 discovery of several NEOs approximately 2 to 3 kilometers in diameter (e.g. 2009 CR_{2}, 2009 HC82, 2009 KJ, 2009 MS and 2009 OG) demonstrated there were still large objects to be detected.

United States Representative George E. Brown Jr. (D-CA) was quoted as voicing his support for planetary defense projects in Air & Space Power Chronicles, saying "If some day in the future we discover well in advance that an asteroid that is big enough to cause a mass extinction is going to hit the Earth, and then we alter the course of that asteroid so that it does not hit us, it will be one of the most important accomplishments in all of human history."

Because of Congressman Brown's long-standing commitment to planetary defense, a U.S. House of Representatives' bill, H.R. 1022, was named in his honor: The George E. Brown Jr. Near-Earth Object Survey Act. This bill "to provide for a Near-Earth Object Survey program to detect, track, catalogue, and characterize certain near-Earth asteroids and comets" was introduced in March 2005 by Rep. Dana Rohrabacher (R-CA). It was eventually rolled into S.1281, the NASA Authorization Act of 2005, passed by Congress on December 22, 2005, subsequently signed by the President, and stating in part:

The U.S. Congress has declared that the general welfare and security of the United States require that the unique competence of NASA be directed to detecting, tracking, cataloguing, and characterizing near-Earth asteroids and comets in order to provide warning and mitigation of the potential hazard of such near-Earth objects to the Earth. The NASA Administrator shall plan, develop, and implement a Near-Earth Object Survey program to detect, track, catalogue, and characterize the physical characteristics of near-Earth objects equal to or greater than 140 meters in diameter in order to assess the threat of such near-Earth objects to the Earth. It shall be the goal of the Survey program to achieve 90% completion of its near-Earth object catalogue (based on statistically predicted populations of near-Earth objects) within 15 years after the date of enactment of this Act. The NASA Administrator shall transmit to Congress not later than 1 year after the date of enactment of this Act an initial report that provides the following: (A) An analysis of possible alternatives that NASA may employ to carry out the Survey program, including ground-based and space-based alternatives with technical descriptions. (B) A recommended option and proposed budget to carry out the Survey program pursuant to the recommended option. (C) Analysis of possible alternatives that NASA could employ to divert an object on a likely collision course with Earth.

The result of this directive was a report presented to Congress in early March 2007. This was an Analysis of Alternatives (AoA) study led by NASA's Program Analysis and Evaluation (PA&E) office with support from outside consultants, the Aerospace Corporation, NASA Langley Research Center (LaRC), and SAIC (amongst others).

=== Ongoing projects ===
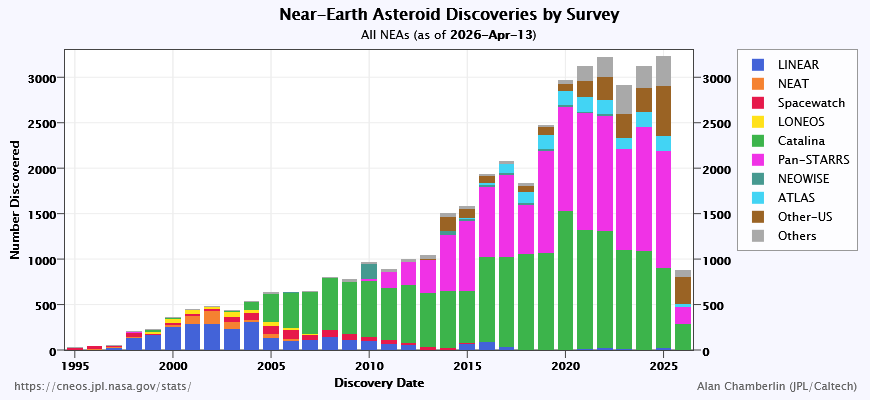
Number of NEOs detected by various projects.

NEOWISE – first four years of data starting in December 2013 (animated; April 20, 2018)

The Minor Planet Center in Cambridge, Massachusetts has been cataloging the orbits of asteroids and comets since 1947. It has recently been joined by surveys that specialize in locating the near-Earth objects (NEO), many (as of early 2007) funded by NASA's Near Earth Object program office as part of their Spaceguard program. One of the best-known is LINEAR that began in 1996. By 2004 LINEAR was discovering tens of thousands of objects each year and accounting for 65% of all new asteroid detections. LINEAR uses two one-meter telescopes and one half-meter telescope based in New Mexico.

The Catalina Sky Survey (CSS) is conducted at the Steward Observatory's Catalina Station, located near Tucson, Arizona, in the United States. It uses two telescopes, a 1.5-meter (59 in) f/2 telescope on the peak of Mount Lemmon, and a 68-centimeter (27 in) f/1.7 Schmidt telescope near Mount Bigelow (both in the Tucson, Arizona area). In 2005, CSS became the most prolific NEO survey surpassing Lincoln Near-Earth Asteroid Research (LINEAR) in total number of NEOs and potentially hazardous asteroids discovered each year since. CSS discovered 310 NEOs in 2005, 396 in 2006, 466 in 2007, and in 2008 564 NEOs were found.

Spacewatch, which uses a 90-centimeter (35 in) telescope sited at the Kitt Peak Observatory in Arizona, updated with automatic pointing, imaging, and analysis equipment to search the skies for intruders, was set up in 1980 by Tom Gehrels and Robert S. McMillan of the Lunar and Planetary Laboratory of the University of Arizona in Tucson, and is now being operated by McMillan. The Spacewatch project has acquired a 1.8-meter (71 in) telescope, also at Kitt Peak, to hunt for NEOs, and has provided the old 90-centimeter telescope with an improved electronic imaging system with much greater resolution, improving its search capability.

Other near-Earth object tracking programs include Near-Earth Asteroid Tracking (NEAT), Lowell Observatory Near-Earth-Object Search (LONEOS), Campo Imperatore Near-Earth Object Survey (CINEOS), Japanese Spaceguard Association, and Asiago-DLR Asteroid Survey. Pan-STARRS completed telescope construction in 2010, and it is now actively observing.

The Asteroid Terrestrial-impact Last Alert System, in operation since 2015, conducts almost nightly scans of the night sky with a view to later-stage detection on the collision stretch of the asteroid orbit. Those would be much too late for deflection, but still in time for evacuation and preparation of the affected Earth region.

Another project, supported by the European Union, is NEOShield, which analyses realistic options for preventing the collision of a NEO with Earth. Their aim is to provide test mission designs for feasible NEO mitigation concepts. The project particularly emphasises on two aspects.

1. The first one is the focus on technological development on essential techniques and instruments needed for guidance, navigation and control (GNC) in close vicinity of asteroids and comets. This will, for example, allow hitting such bodies with a high-velocity kinetic impactor spacecraft and observing them before, during and after a mitigation attempt, e.g., for orbit determination and monitoring.
2. The second one focuses on refining Near Earth Object (NEO) characterisation. Moreover, NEOShield-2 will carry out astronomical observations of NEOs, to improve the understanding of their physical properties, concentrating on the smaller sizes of most concern for mitigation purposes, and to identify further objects suitable for missions for physical characterisation and NEO deflection demonstration.

"Spaceguard" is the name for these loosely affiliated programs, some of which receive NASA funding to meet a U.S. Congressional requirement to detect 90% of near-Earth asteroids over 1 km diameter by 2008. A 2003 NASA study of a follow-on program suggests spending US$250–450 million to detect 90% of all near-Earth asteroids 140 meters (460 ft) and larger by 2028.

NEODyS is an online database of known NEOs.

==== Notification and response coordination ====
In October 2013, the United Nations Committee on the Peaceful Uses of Outer Space approved several measures to deal with terrestrial asteroid impacts, including the creation of an International Asteroid Warning Network (IAWN) to act as a clearinghouse for shared information on dangerous asteroids and for any future terrestrial impact events that are identified. Space Missions Planning Advisory Group (SMPAG) should coordinate joint studies of the technologies for deflection missions, and as well provide oversight of actual missions. This is due to deflection missions typically involving a progressive movement of an asteroid's predicted impact point across the surface of the Earth (and also across the territories of uninvolved countries) until the NEO has been deflected either ahead of, or behind the planet at the point their orbits intersect. UN General Assembly endorsed the establishment of IAWN through its resolution 68/75 on 16 December 2023. IAWN's main task is to warn of a possible impact threat, if the following criteria are reached: an impact probability of >1% within the next 20 years, for an object larger than about 10 meters in size. The number of known NEOs was 34,274 as of 30 January 2024, with 2,395 known asteroids whose orbits bring them within 8 million kilometers of Earth's orbit and with diameters larger than about 140 m. Yet, it is estimated only about 44% of the NEOs of that size range have been found so far.

The first time the notification threshold was reached was during the process of refining the orbital parameters of 2024 YR_{4}. The United Nations Office for Outer Space Affairs emailed United States Space Force, among others. Potential impactors are publicly posted on the IAWN home page. There are no firm commitments from spacefaring nations as to what response would be mounted to any dangerous Earth-impacting asteroids. Planning for various scenarios is still underway as of 2025, including impacts affecting the whole planet vs. a spacefaring country vs. an area without the economic means to launch a spacecraft or territory to evacuate effectively. Scientists worry many people would deny the reality of the danger, as depicted in the 2021 fiction film Don't Look Up.

==== Sentinel mission ====
The B612 Foundation is a private nonprofit foundation with headquarters in the United States, dedicated to protecting the Earth from asteroid strikes. It is led mainly by scientists, former astronauts and engineers from the Institute for Advanced Study, Southwest Research Institute, Stanford University, NASA and the space industry.

As a non-governmental organization it has conducted two lines of related research to help detect NEOs that could one day strike the Earth, and find the technological means to divert their path to avoid such collisions. The foundation's goal had been to design and build a privately financed asteroid-finding space telescope, Sentinel, which was to be launched in 2017–2018. However the project was cancelled in 2015. Had the Sentinel's infrared telescope been parked in an orbit similar to that of Venus, it would have helped identify threatening NEOs by cataloging 90% of those with diameters larger than 140 meters (460 ft), as well as surveying smaller Solar System objects.

Data gathered by Sentinel would have helped identify asteroids and other NEOs that pose a risk of collision with Earth, by being forwarded to scientific data-sharing networks, including NASA and academic institutions such as the Minor Planet Center. The foundation also proposes asteroid deflection of potentially dangerous NEOs by the use of gravity tractors to divert their trajectories away from Earth, a concept co-invented by the organization's CEO, physicist and former NASA astronaut Ed Lu.

=== Prospective projects ===
Orbit@home intends to provide distributed computing resources to optimize search strategy. On February 16, 2013, the project was halted due to lack of grant funding. However, on July 23, 2013, the orbit@home project was selected for funding by NASA's Near Earth Object Observation program and was to resume operations sometime in early 2014. As of July 13, 2018, the project is offline according to its website.

The Vera C. Rubin Observatory began a comprehensive, high-resolution decade-long survey starting in the fall of 2025. It is expected to catalog 80–90% of potentially hazardous asteroids larger than 140 meters.

=== Detection from space ===
On November 8, 2007, the House Committee on Science and Technology's Subcommittee on Space and Aeronautics held a hearing to examine the status of NASA's Near-Earth Object survey program. The prospect of using the Wide-field Infrared Survey Explorer was proposed by NASA officials.

WISE surveyed the sky in the infrared band at a very high sensitivity. Asteroids that absorb solar radiation can be observed through the infrared band. It was used to detect NEOs, in addition to performing its science goals. It is projected that WISE could detect 400 NEOs (roughly two percent of the estimated NEO population of interest) within the one-year mission.

NEOSSat, the Near Earth Object Surveillance Satellite, is a microsatellite launched in February 2013 by the Canadian Space Agency (CSA) that will hunt for NEOs in space. Furthermore Near-Earth Object WISE (NEOWISE), an extension of the WISE mission, started in September 2013 (in its second mission extension) to hunt asteroids and comets close to the orbit of Earth.

=== Deep Impact ===
Research published in the March 26, 2009 issue of the journal Nature, describes how scientists were able to identify an asteroid in space before it entered Earth's atmosphere, enabling computers to determine its area of origin in the Solar System as well as predict the arrival time and location on Earth of its shattered surviving parts. The four-meter-diameter asteroid, called 2008 TC_{3}, was initially sighted by the automated Catalina Sky Survey telescope, on October 6, 2008. Computations correctly predicted that it would impact 19 hours after discovery and in the Nubian Desert of northern Sudan.

A number of potential threats have been identified, such as 99942 Apophis (previously known by its provisional designation 2004 MN_{4}), which in 2004 temporarily had an impact probability of about 3% for the year 2029. Additional observations revised this probability down to zero.

=== Double Asteroid Redirection Test ===
On September 26, 2022 DART impacted Dimorphos, reducing the minor-planet moon's orbital period by 32 minutes. This mission was the first successful attempt at asteroid deflection.

=== Chinese asteroid deflection mission ===
China's CNSA intended to launch a deflection mission to near-Earth object 2019 VL5, a 30-meter wide asteroid, by 2025. In 2024 it was announced that the target asteroid had been changed to 2015 XF261 instead, with the launch taking place in 2027 and the arrival of the spacecraft at the asteroid in 2029. The mission will launch on a Long March 3B rocket and carry both an impactor and observer spacecraft.

== Impact probability calculation pattern ==
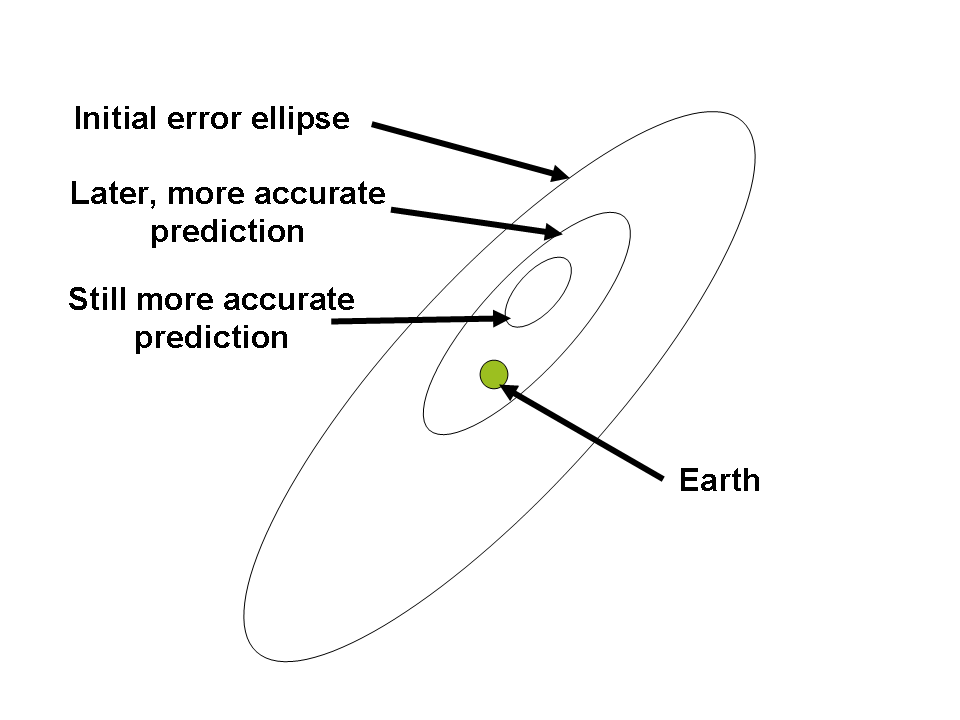
Why asteroid impact probability often goes up, then down.

The ellipses in the diagram on the right show the predicted position of an example asteroid at closest Earth approach. At first, with only a few asteroid observations, the error ellipse is very large and includes the Earth. Further observations shrink the error ellipse, but it still includes the Earth. This raises the predicted impact probability, since the Earth now covers a larger fraction of the error region. Finally, yet more observations (often radar observations, or discovery of a previous sighting of the same asteroid on archival images) shrink the ellipse revealing that the Earth is outside the error region, and the impact probability is near zero.

For asteroids that are actually on track to hit Earth the predicted probability of impact continues to increase as more observations are made. This similar pattern makes it initially difficult to differentiate between asteroids that will only come close to Earth and those that will actually hit it. This in turn makes it difficult to decide when to raise an alarm as gaining more certainty takes time, which reduces time available to react to a predicted impact. However, raising the alarm too soon has the danger of causing a false alarm and creating a Boy Who Cried Wolf effect if the asteroid in fact misses Earth.

== Collision avoidance strategies ==
Cost, risk of failure, complexity, technology readiness, and overall performance are all important trade-offs in weighing collision avoidance strategies. Methods can be differentiated by the type of mitigation (deflection or fragmentation), energy source (kinetic, electromagnetic, gravitational, solar/thermal, or nuclear), and approach strategy (interception, rendezvous, or remote station).

Strategies fall into two basic sets: fragmentation and delay. Fragmentation concentrates on rendering the impactor harmless by fragmenting it and scattering the fragments so that they miss the Earth or are small enough to burn up in the atmosphere. Delay exploits the fact that both the Earth and the impactor are in orbit. An impact occurs when both reach the same point in space at the same time, or more correctly when some point on Earth's surface intersects the impactor's orbit when the impactor arrives. Since the Earth is approximately 12,750 kilometers (7,920 mi) in diameter and moves at approximately 30 km/s (19 mi/s) in its orbit, it travels a distance of one planetary diameter in about 425 seconds, or slightly over seven minutes. Delaying, or advancing the impactor's arrival by times of this magnitude can, depending on the exact geometry of the impact, cause it to miss the Earth.

Collision avoidance strategies can also be seen as either direct, or indirect and in how rapidly they transfer energy to the object. The direct methods, such as nuclear explosives, or kinetic impactors, rapidly intercept the bolide's path. Direct methods are preferred because they are generally less costly in time and money. Their effects may be immediate, thus saving precious time. These methods would work for short-notice and long-notice threats, and are most effective against solid objects that can be directly pushed, but in the case of kinetic impactors, they are not very effective against large loosely aggregated rubble piles. Indirect methods, such as gravity tractors, attaching rockets or mass drivers, are much slower. They require traveling to the object, changing course up to 180 degrees for space rendezvous, and then taking much more time to change the asteroid's path just enough so it will miss Earth.

Many NEOs are thought to be "flying rubble piles" only loosely held together by gravity, and a typical spacecraft sized kinetic-impactor deflection attempt might just break up the object or fragment it without sufficiently adjusting its course. If an asteroid breaks into fragments, any fragment larger than 35 meters (115 ft) across would not burn up in the atmosphere and itself could impact Earth. Tracking the thousands of buckshot-like fragments that could result from such an explosion would be a very daunting task, although fragmentation would be preferable to doing nothing and allowing the originally larger rubble body, which is analogous to a shot and wax slug, to impact the Earth.

In Cielo simulations conducted in 2011–2012, in which the rate and quantity of energy delivery were sufficiently high and matched to the size of the rubble pile, such as following a tailored nuclear explosion, results indicated that any asteroid fragments, created after the pulse of energy is delivered, would not pose a threat of re-coalescing (including for those with the shape of asteroid Itokawa) but instead would rapidly achieve escape velocity from their parent body (which for Itokawa is about 0.2 m/s) and therefore move out of an Earth-impact trajectory.

=== Nuclear explosive device ===
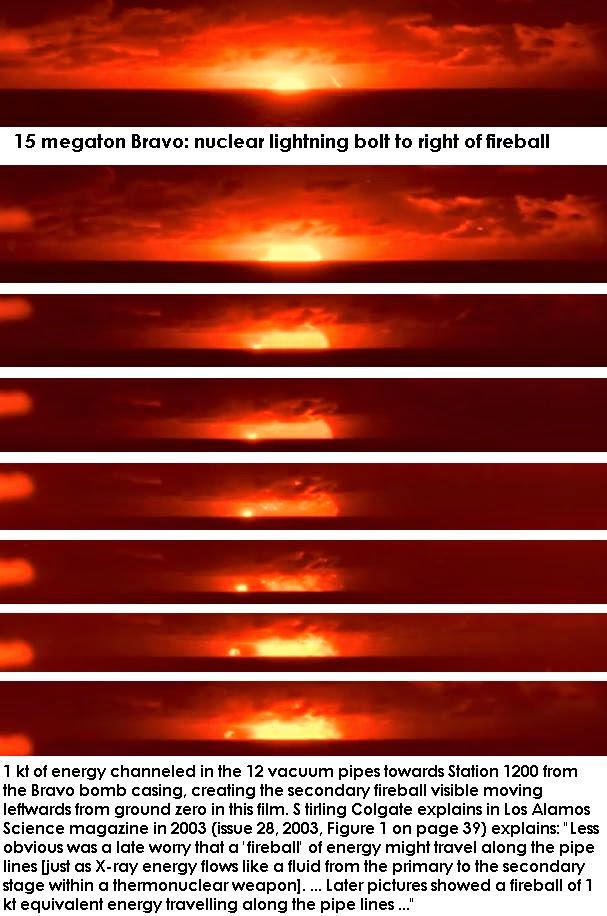
In a similar manner to the earlier pipes filled with a partial pressure of helium, as used in the Ivy Mike test of 1952, the 1954 Castle Bravo test was likewise heavily instrumented with line-of-sight (LOS) pipes, to better define and quantify the timing and energies of the x-rays and neutrons produced by these early thermonuclear devices. One of the outcomes of this diagnostic work resulted in this graphic depiction of the transport of energetic x-ray and neutrons through a vacuum line, some 2.3 km long, whereupon it heated solid matter at the "station 1200" blockhouse and thus generated a secondary fireball.

Initiating a nuclear explosive device above, on, or slightly beneath, the surface of a threatening celestial body is a potential deflection option, with the optimal detonation height dependent upon the composition and size of the object. It does not require the entire NEO to be vaporized to mitigate an impact threat. In the case of an inbound threat from a "rubble pile", the stand off, or detonation height above the surface configuration, has been put forth as a means to prevent the potential fracturing of the rubble pile. The energetic neutrons and soft X-rays released by the detonation, which do not appreciably penetrate matter, are converted into heat upon encountering the object's surface matter, ablatively vaporizing all line of sight exposed surface areas of the object to a shallow depth, turning the surface material it heats up into ejecta, and, analogous to the ejecta from a chemical rocket engine exhaust, changing the velocity, or "nudging", the object off course by the reaction, following Newton's third law, with ejecta going one way and the object being propelled in the other. Depending on the energy of the explosive device, the resulting rocket exhaust effect, created by the high velocity of the asteroid's vaporized mass ejecta, coupled with the object's small reduction in mass, would produce enough of a change in the object's orbit to make it miss the Earth.

A Hypervelocity Asteroid Mitigation Mission for Emergency Response (HAMMER) has been proposed. While there have been no updates as of 2023 regarding the HAMMER, NASA has published its regular Planetary Defense Strategy and Action Plan for 2023. In it, NASA acknowledges that it is crucial to continue studying the potential of nuclear energy in deflecting or destroying asteroids. This is because it is currently the only option for defense if scientists were not aware of the asteroid within a few months or years, depending on the asteroid's velocity. The report also notes there needs to be research done into the legal implications as well as policy implications on the topic.

==== Stand-off approach ====
If the object is very large but is still a loosely-held-together rubble pile, a solution is to detonate one or a series of nuclear explosive devices alongside the asteroid, at a 20-meter (66 ft) or greater stand-off height above its surface, so as not to fracture the potentially loosely-held-together object. Providing that this stand-off strategy was done far enough in advance, the force from a sufficient number of nuclear blasts would alter the object's trajectory enough to avoid an impact, according to computer simulations and experimental evidence from meteorites exposed to the thermal X-ray pulses of the Z-machine.

In 1967, graduate students under Professor Paul Sandorff at the Massachusetts Institute of Technology were tasked with designing a method to prevent a hypothetical 18-month distant impact on Earth by the 1.4-kilometer-wide (0.87 mi) asteroid 1566 Icarus, an object that makes regular close approaches to Earth, sometimes as close as 16 lunar distances. To achieve the task within the timeframe and with limited material knowledge of the asteroid's composition, a variable stand-off system was conceived. This would have used a number of modified Saturn V rockets sent on interception courses and the creation of a handful of nuclear explosive devices in the 100-megaton energy range—coincidentally, the same as the maximum yield of the Soviets' Tsar Bomba would have been if a uranium tamper had been used—as each rocket vehicle's payload. The design study was later published as Project Icarus which served as the inspiration for the 1979 film Meteor.

A NASA analysis of deflection alternatives, conducted in 2007, stated:

Nuclear standoff explosions are assessed to be 10–100 times more effective than the non-nuclear alternatives analyzed in this study. Other techniques involving the surface or subsurface use of nuclear explosives may be more efficient, but they run an increased risk of fracturing the target NEO. They also carry higher development and operations risks.

In the same year, NASA released a study where the asteroid Apophis (with a diameter of around 300 meters or 1,000 feet) was assumed to have a much lower rubble pile density (1,500 kg/m^{3} or 100 lb/cu ft) and therefore lower mass than it is now known to have, and in the study, it is assumed to be on an impact trajectory with Earth for the year 2029. Under these hypothetical conditions, the report determines that a "Cradle spacecraft" would be sufficient to deflect it from Earth impact. This conceptual spacecraft contains six B83 physics packages, each set for their maximum 1.2-megatonne yield, bundled together and lofted by an Ares V vehicle sometime in the 2020s, with each B83 being fuzed to detonate over the asteroid's surface at a height of 100 meters or 330 feet ("1/3 of the objects diameter" as its stand-off), one after the other, with hour-long intervals between each detonation. The results of this study indicated that a single employment of this option "can deflect NEOs of [100–500 meters or 300–1,600 feet diameter] two years before impact, and larger NEOs with at least five years warning". These effectiveness figures are considered to be "conservative" by its authors, and only the thermal X-ray output of the B83 devices was considered, while neutron heating was neglected for ease of calculation purposes.

Research published in 2021 pointed out the fact that for an effective deflection mission, there would need to be a significant amount of warning time, with the ideal being several years or more. The more warning time provided, the less energy will be necessary to divert the asteroid just enough to adjust the trajectory to avoid Earth. The study also emphasized that deflection, as opposed to destruction, can be a safer option, as there is a smaller likelihood of asteroid debris falling to Earth's surface. The researchers proposed the best way to divert an asteroid through deflection is adjusting the output of neutron energy in the nuclear explosion.

==== Surface and subsurface use ====
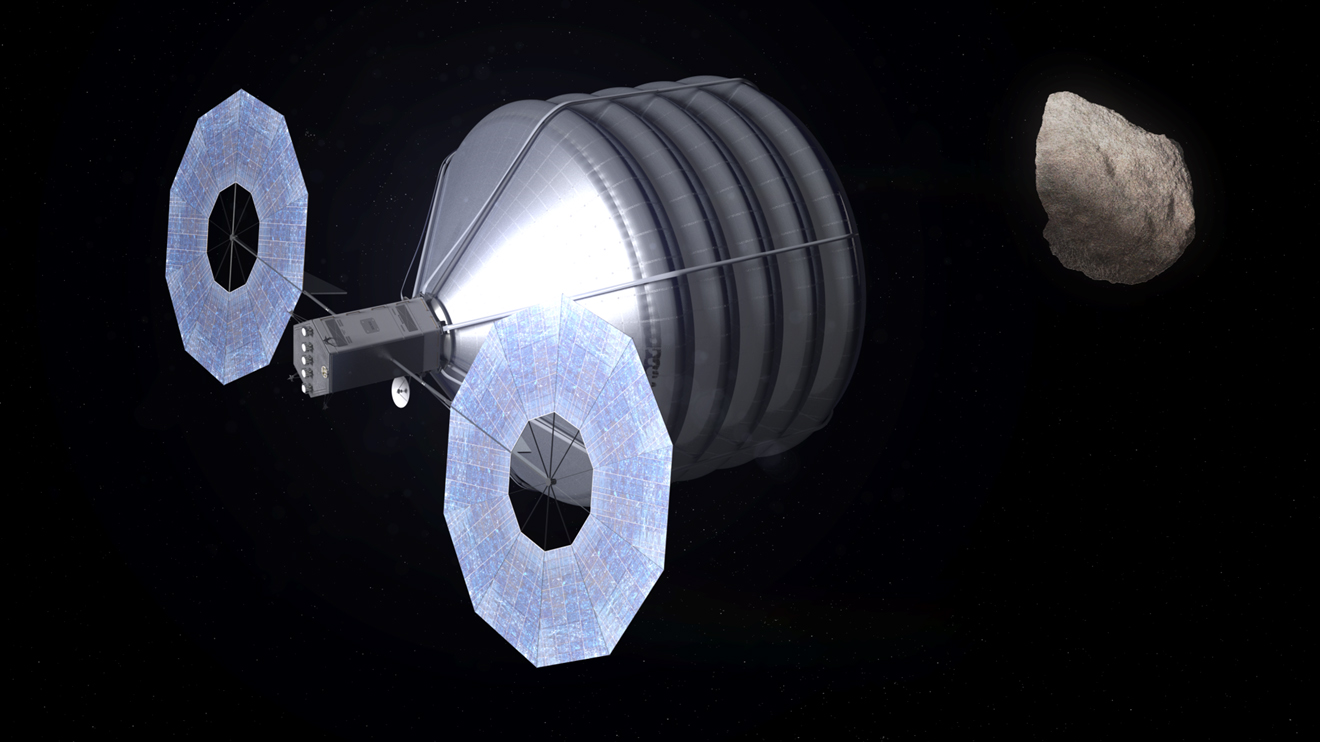
This early Asteroid Redirect Mission artist's impression is suggestive of another method of changing a large threatening celestial body's orbit by capturing relatively smaller celestial objects and using those, and not the usually proposed small bits of spacecraft, as the means of creating a powerful kinetic impact, or alternatively, a stronger faster acting gravitational tractor, as some low-density asteroids such as 253 Mathilde can dissipate impact energy.

In 2011, the director of the Asteroid Deflection Research Center at Iowa State University, Dr. Bong Wie (who had published kinetic impactor deflection studies previously), began to study strategies that could deal with 50-to-500-meter-diameter (200–1,600 ft) objects when the time to Earth impact was less than one year. He concluded that to provide the required energy, a nuclear explosion or other event that could deliver the same power, are the only methods that can work against a very large asteroid within these time constraints.

This work resulted in the creation of a conceptual Hypervelocity Asteroid Intercept Vehicle (HAIV), which combines a kinetic impactor to create an initial crater for a follow-up subsurface nuclear detonation within that initial crater, which would generate a high degree of efficiency in the conversion of the nuclear energy that is released in the detonation into propulsion energy to the asteroid.

A similar proposal would use a surface-detonating nuclear device in place of the kinetic impactor to create the initial crater, then using the crater as a rocket nozzle to channel succeeding nuclear detonations.

Wie claimed the computer models he worked on showed the possibility for a 300-meter-wide (980-foot) asteroid to be destroyed using a single HAIV with a warning time of 30 days. Additionally, the models showed that less than 0.1% of debris from the asteroid would reach Earth's surface. There have been few substantial updates from Wie and his team since 2014 regarding the research.

As of 2015, Wie has collaborated with the Danish Emergency Asteroid Defence Project (EADP), which intends to crowdsource sufficient funds to design, build, and store a non-nuclear HAIV spacecraft as planetary insurance. For threatening asteroids too large or close to Earth impact to effectively be deflected by the non-nuclear HAIV approach, nuclear explosive devices (with 5% of the explosive yield than those used for the stand-off strategy) are intended to be used, under international oversight, when conditions arise that necessitate it.

A study published in 2020 pointed out that a non-nuclear kinetic impact becomes less effective the larger and closer the asteroid. However, researchers ran a model that suggested a nuclear detonation near the surface of an asteroid designed to cover one side of the asteroid with x-rays would be effective. When the x-rays cover one side of an asteroid in the program, the energy would propel the asteroid in a preferred direction. The lead researcher with the study, Dave Dearborn, said a nuclear impact offered more flexibility than a non-nuclear approach, as the energy output can be adjusted specifically to the asteroid's size and location.

==== Comet deflection possibility ====
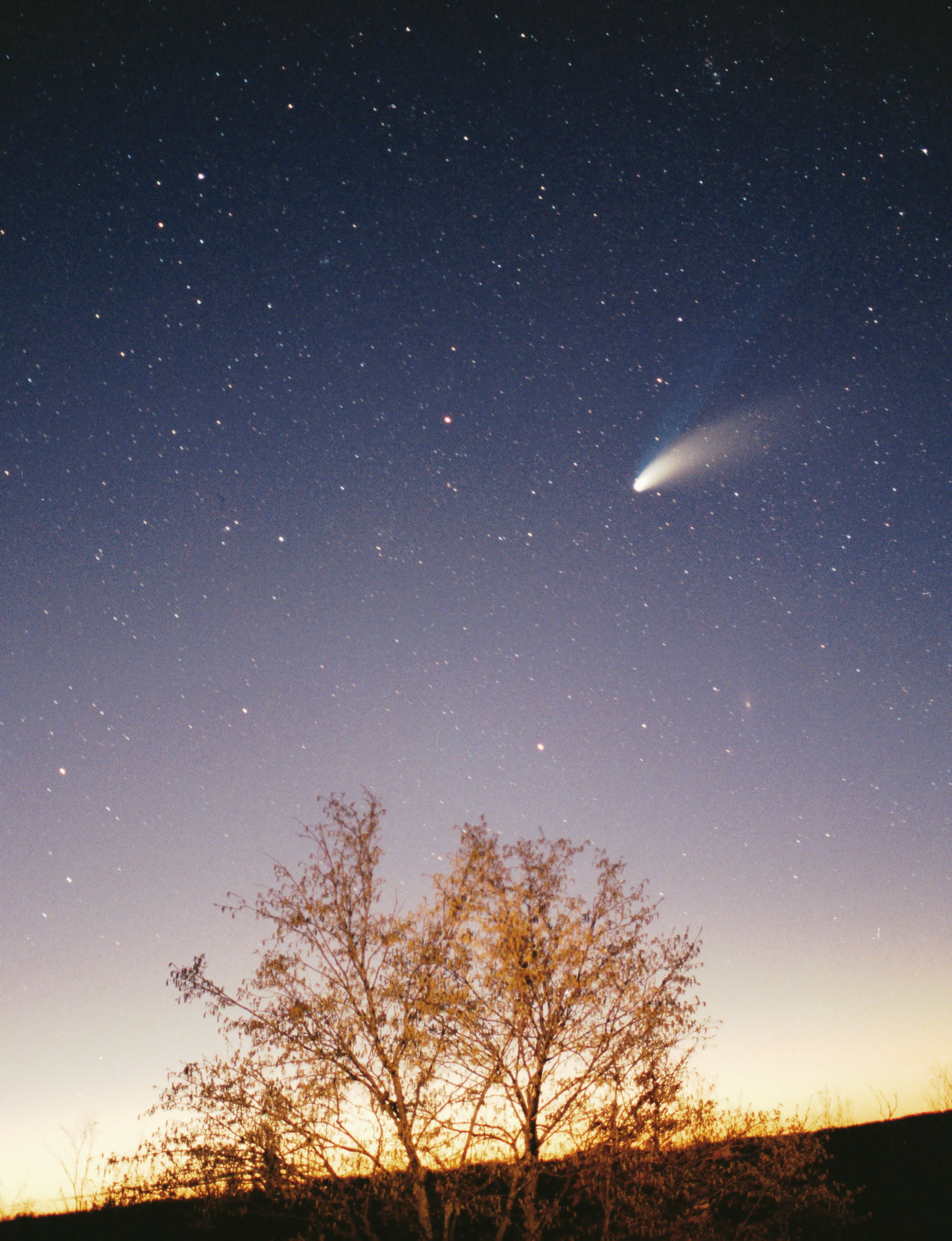
"Who knows whether, when a comet shall approach this globe to destroy it ... men will not tear rocks from their foundations by means of steam, and hurl mountains, as the giants are said to have done, against the flaming mass?" — Lord Byron

Following the 1994 Shoemaker-Levy 9 comet impacts with Jupiter, Edward Teller proposed, to a collective of U.S. and Russian ex-Cold War weapons designers in a 1995 planetary defense workshop meeting at Lawrence Livermore National Laboratory (LLNL), that they collaborate to design a one-gigaton nuclear explosive device, which would be equivalent to the kinetic energy of a one-kilometer-diameter (0.6 mi) asteroid. The theoretical one-gigaton device would weigh about 25–30 tons, light enough to be lifted on the Energia rocket. It could be used to instantaneously vaporize a one-kilometer asteroid, divert the paths of ELE-class asteroids (greater than 10 kilometers or 6.2 miles in diameter) within short notice of a few months. With one year of notice, and at an interception location no closer than Jupiter, it could also deal with the even rarer short period comets that can come out of the Kuiper belt and transit past Earth orbit within two years. For comets of this class, with a maximum estimated diameter of 100 kilometers (60 mi), Chiron served as the hypothetical threat.

In 2013, the related National Laboratories of the US and Russia signed a deal that includes an intent to cooperate on defense from asteroids. The deal was meant to complement New START, but Russia suspended its participation in the treaty in 2023. As of April 2023, there has not been an official update from the White House or Moscow on how Russia's suspended participation will affect adjacent treaties.

==== Present capability ====
As of late 2022, the most likely and most effective method for asteroid deflection does not involve nuclear technology. Instead, it involves a kinetic impactor designed to redirect the asteroid, which showed promise in the NASA DART mission. For nuclear technology, simulations have been run analyzing the possibility of using neutron energy put off by a nuclear device to redirect an asteroid. These simulations showed promise, with one study finding that increasing the neutron energy output had a notable effect on the angle of the asteroid's travel. However, there has not been a practical test studying the possibility as of April 2023.

=== Kinetic impact ===
The 2005 Deep Impact collision with the eight-by-five-kilometer (5 by 3 mi) comet Tempel 1. The impact flash and resulting ejecta are clearly visible. The impactor delivered 19 gigajoules (the equivalent of 4.8 tons of TNT) upon impact. Impact created a crater estimated to be about 150 meters in diameter. The comet "returned to preimpact conditions only 6 days after the event".

The impact of a massive object, such as a spacecraft or even another near-Earth object, is another possible solution to a pending NEO impact. An object with a high mass close to the Earth could be sent out into a collision course with the asteroid, knocking it off course.

When the asteroid is still far from the Earth, a means of deflecting the asteroid is to directly alter its momentum by colliding a spacecraft with the asteroid.

Compiled timelapse of DART's final 5.5 minutes until impact

A NASA analysis of deflection alternatives, conducted in 2007, stated:

Non-nuclear kinetic impactors are the most mature approach and could be used in some deflection/mitigation scenarios, especially for NEOs that consist of a single small, solid body.

This deviation method, which has been implemented by DART and, for a completely different purpose (analysis of the structure and composition of a comet), by NASA's Deep Impact space probe, involves launching a spacecraft against the near Earth object. The speed of the asteroid is modified due to the law of conservation of momentum:

M_{1} x V_{1} + M_{2} x V_{2} = (M_{1} + M_{2}) x V_{3}

with V_{1} velocity of the spacecraft, V_{2} velocity of the celestial body before impact, and V_{3} the velocity after impact. M_{1} and M_{2} respective mass of the spacecraft and of the celestial body. Velocities are vectors here.

The European Union's NEOShield-2 Mission is also primarily studying the Kinetic Impactor mitigation method. The principle of the kinetic impactor mitigation method is that the NEO or Asteroid is deflected following an impact from an impactor spacecraft. The principle of momentum transfer is used, as the impactor crashes into the NEO at a very high velocity of 10 km/s (36,000 km/h; 22,000 mph) or more. The momentum of the impactor is transferred to the NEO, causing a change in velocity and therefore making it deviate from its course slightly.

As of mid-2021, the modified AIDA mission has been approved. The NASA Double Asteroid Redirection Test (DART) kinetic impactor spacecraft was launched in November 2021. The goal was to impact Dimorphos (nicknamed Didymoon), the 180-meter (590 ft) minor-planet moon of near-Earth asteroid 65803 Didymos. The impact occurred in September 2022 when Didymos is relatively close to Earth, allowing Earth-based telescopes and planetary radar to observe the event. The result of the impact will be to change the orbital velocity and hence orbital period of Dimorphos, by a large enough amount that it can be measured from Earth. This will show for the first time that it is possible to change the orbit of a small 200-meter (660 ft) asteroid, around the size most likely to require active mitigation in the future. The launch and use of the Double Asteroid Redirection Test system in March 2023 showed the world that asteroids could be safely redirected without the use of nuclear means. The second part of the AIDA mission–the ESA HERA spacecraft–has been approved by ESA member states in October 2019. It would reach the Didymos system in 2026 and measure both the mass of Dimorphos and the precise effect of the impact on that body, allowing much better extrapolation of the AIDA mission to other targets.

=== Asteroid gravity tractor ===
The Asteroid Redirect Mission vehicle was conceived to demonstrate the "gravity tractor" planetary defense technique on a hazardous-size asteroid. The gravity-tractor method leverages the mass of the spacecraft to impart a force on the asteroid, slowly altering the asteroid's trajectory.

Another alternative to explosive deflection is to move the asteroid slowly over time. A small but constant amount of thrust accumulates to deviate an object sufficiently from its course. Edward T. Lu and Stanley G. Love have proposed using a massive uncrewed spacecraft hovering over an asteroid to gravitationally pull the asteroid into a non-threatening orbit. Though both objects are gravitationally pulled towards each other, the spacecraft can counter the force towards the asteroid by, for example, an ion thruster, so the net effect would be that the asteroid is accelerated towards the spacecraft and thus slightly deflected from its orbit. While slow, this method has the advantage of working irrespective of the asteroid's composition or spin rate; rubble pile asteroids would be difficult to deflect by means of nuclear detonations, while a pushing device would be difficult or inefficient to mount on a fast-rotating asteroid. A gravity tractor would likely have to spend several years beside the asteroid to be effective.

A NASA analysis of deflection alternatives, conducted in 2007, stated:

"Slow push" mitigation techniques are the most expensive, have the lowest level of technical readiness, and their ability to both travel to and divert a threatening NEO would be limited unless mission durations of many years to decades are possible.

=== Ion beam deflection ===
Another "contactless" asteroid deflection technique involves the use of a low-divergence ion thruster pointed at the asteroid from a nearby hovering spacecraft. The momentum transmitted by the ions reaching the asteroid surface produces a slow but continuous force that can deflect the asteroid in a similar way as the gravity tractor, but with a lighter spacecraft.

=== Focused solar energy ===
H. J. Melosh with I. V. Nemchinov proposed deflecting an asteroid or comet by focusing solar energy onto its surface to create thrust from the resulting vaporization of material. This method would first require the construction of a space station with a system of large collecting, concave mirrors similar to those used in solar furnaces.

Orbit mitigation with highly concentrated sunlight is scalable to achieving the predetermined deflection within a year even for a global-threatening body without prolonged warning time.

Such a hastened strategy may become topical in the case of late detection of a potential hazard, and also, if required, in providing the possibility for some additional action. Conventional concave reflectors are practically inapplicable to the high-concentrating geometry in the case of a giant shadowing space target, which is located in front of the mirrored surface. This is primarily because of the dramatic spread of the mirrors' focal points on the target due to the optical aberration when the optical axis is not aligned with the Sun. On the other hand, the positioning of any collector at a distance to the target much larger than its size does not yield the required concentration level (and therefore temperature) due to the natural divergence of the sunrays. Such principal restrictions are inevitably at any location regarding the asteroid of one or many unshaded forward-reflecting collectors. Also, in the case of secondary mirrors use, similar to the ones found in Cassegrain telescopes, would be prone to heat damage by partially concentrated sunlight from primary mirror.

In order to remove the above restrictions, V.P. Vasylyev proposed to apply an alternative design of a mirrored collector – the ring-array concentrator. This type of collector has an underside lens-like position of its focal area that avoids shadowing of the collector by the target and minimizes the risk of its coating by ejected debris. Provided the sunlight concentration of approximately 5 × 10^{3} times, a surface irradiance of around 4-5 MW/m^{2} leads to a thrusting effect of about 1,000 N (200 lbf). Intensive ablation of the rotating asteroid surface under the focal spot will lead to the appearance of a deep "canyon", which can contribute to the formation of the escaping gas flow into a jet-like one. This may be sufficient to deflect a 0.5 km (0.3 mi) asteroid within several months and no addition warning period, only using ring-array collector size of about half of the asteroid's diameter. For such a prompt deflection of the larger NEOs, 1.3 to 2.2 km (0.8 to 1.4 mi), the required collector sizes are comparable to the target diameter. In the case of a longer warning time, the required size of the collector may be significantly decreased.

Artist's impression of asteroid deflection using an innovative ring-array solar collector.

=== Mass driver ===
A mass driver is an (automated) system on the asteroid to eject material into space, thus giving the object a slow steady push and decreasing its mass. A mass driver is designed to work as a very low specific impulse system, which in general uses a lot of propellant, but very little power. This essentially uses the asteroid against itself in order to divert a collision.

Modular Asteroid Deflection Mission Ejector Node, (MADMEN), is the idea of landing small unmanned vehicles such as space rovers to break up small portions of the asteroid. Using drills to break up small rocks and boulders from the surface, debris would eject from the surface very fast. Because there are no forces acting on the asteroid these rocks will push the asteroid off course at a very slow rate. This process takes time but could be very effective if implemented correctly. The idea is that when using local material as propellant, the amount of propellant is not as important as the amount of power, which is likely to be limited.

=== Conventional rocket engine ===
Attaching any spacecraft propulsion device would have a similar effect of giving a push, possibly forcing the asteroid onto a trajectory that takes it away from Earth. An in-space rocket engine that is capable of imparting an impulse of 10^{6} N·s (E.g. adding 1 km/s to a 1000 kg vehicle), will have a relatively small effect on a relatively small asteroid that has a mass of roughly a million times more. Chapman, Durda, and Gold's white paper calculates deflections using existing chemical rockets delivered to the asteroid.

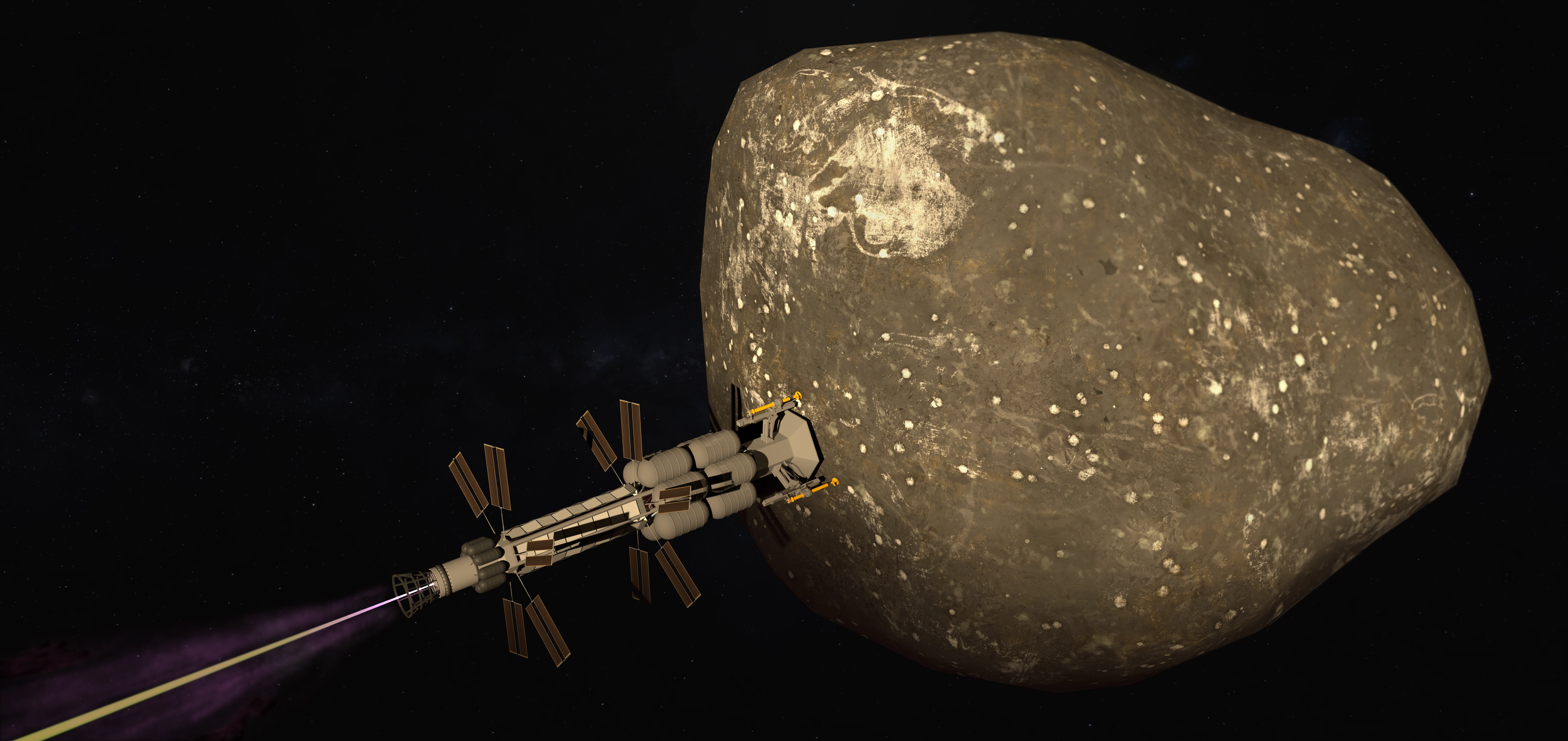
3D sketch of a pulsed plasma electromagnetic thruster attaching to an asteroid for asteroid impact avoidance

Such direct force rocket engines are typically proposed to use highly-efficient electrically powered spacecraft propulsion, such as ion thrusters or VASIMR.

=== Asteroid laser ablation ===
Similar to the effects of a nuclear device, it is thought possible to focus sufficient laser energy on the surface of an asteroid to cause flash vaporization / ablation to create either in impulse or to ablate away the asteroid mass. This concept, called asteroid laser ablation was articulated in the 1995 SpaceCast 2020 white paper "Preparing for Planetary Defense", and the 1996 Air Force 2025 white paper "Planetary Defense: Catastrophic Health Insurance for Planet Earth". Early publications include C. R. Phipps "ORION" concept from 1996, Colonel Jonathan W. Campbell's 2000 monograph "Using Lasers in Space: Laser Orbital Debris Removal and Asteroid Deflection", and NASA's 2005 concept Comet Asteroid Protection System (CAPS). Typically such systems require a significant amount of power, such as would be available from a Space-Based Solar Power Satellite.

Another proposal is the Phillip Lubin's DE-STAR proposal:

- The DE-STAR project, proposed by researchers at the University of California, Santa Barbara, is a concept modular solar powered 1 μm, near infrared wavelength, laser array. The design calls for the array to eventually be approximately 1 km squared in size, with the modular design meaning that it could be launched in increments and assembled in space. In its early stages as a small array it could deal with smaller targets, assist solar sail probes and would also be useful in cleaning up space debris.

=== Other proposals ===
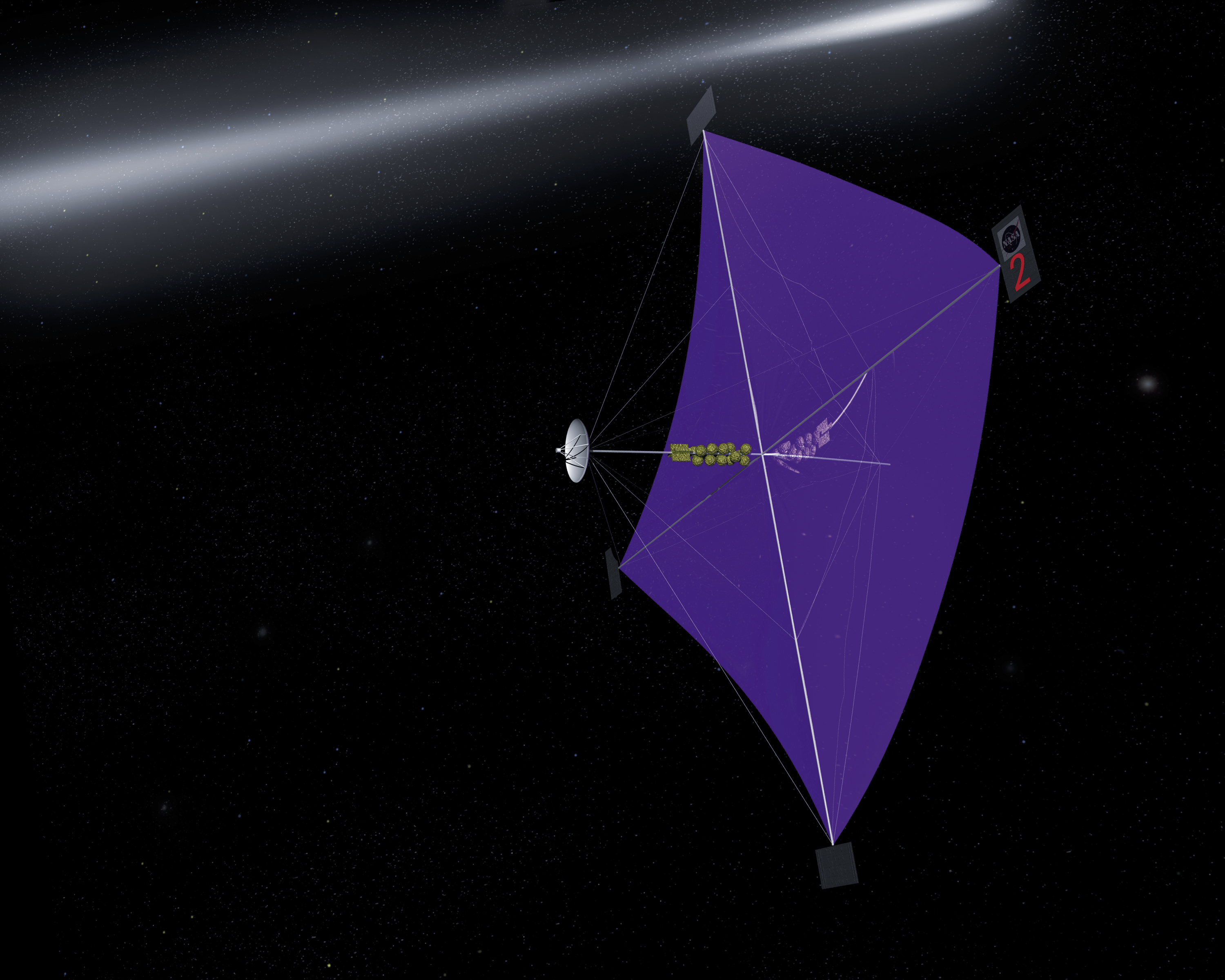
NASA study of a solar sail. The sail would be 0.5 kilometers (0.31 mi) wide.

- Wrapping the asteroid in a sheet of reflective plastic such as aluminized PET film as a solar sail
- "Painting" or dusting the object with titanium dioxide (white) to alter its trajectory via increased reflected radiation pressure or with soot (black) to alter its trajectory via the Yarkovsky effect.
- Planetary scientist Eugene Shoemaker in 1996 proposed deflecting a potential impactor by releasing a cloud of steam in the path of the object, hopefully gently slowing it. Nick Szabo in 1990 sketched a similar idea, "cometary aerobraking", the targeting of a comet or ice construct at an asteroid, then vaporizing the ice with nuclear explosives to form a temporary atmosphere in the path of the asteroid.
- Coherent digger array multiple 1-ton flat tractors able to dig and expel asteroid soil mass as a coherent fountain array, coordinated fountain activity may propel and deflect over years.
- Attaching a tether and ballast mass to the asteroid to alter its trajectory by changing its center of mass.
- Magnetic flux compression to magnetically brake and or capture objects that contain a high percentage of meteoric iron by deploying a wide coil of wire in its orbital path and when it passes through, inductance creates an electromagnet solenoid to be generated.

== Deflection technology concerns ==
Carl Sagan, in his book Pale Blue Dot, expressed concern about deflection technology, noting that any method capable of deflecting impactors away from Earth could also be abused to divert non-threatening bodies toward the planet. Considering the history of genocidal political leaders and the possibility of the bureaucratic obscuring of any such project's true goals to most of its scientific participants, he judged the Earth at greater risk from a man-made impact than a natural one. Sagan instead suggested that deflection technology be developed only in an actual emergency situation.

All low-energy delivery deflection technologies have inherent fine control and steering capability, making it possible to add just the right amount of energy to steer an asteroid originally destined for a mere close approach toward a specific Earth target.

According to former NASA astronaut Rusty Schweickart, the gravitational tractor method is controversial because, during the process of changing an asteroid's trajectory, the point on the Earth where it could most likely hit would be slowly shifted across different countries. Thus, the threat for the entire planet would be minimized at the cost of some specific states' security. In Schweickart's opinion, choosing the way the asteroid should be "dragged" would be a tough diplomatic decision.

Analysis of the uncertainty involved in nuclear deflection shows that the ability to protect the planet does not imply the ability to target the planet. A nuclear explosion that changes an asteroid's velocity by 10 meters per second (plus or minus 20%) would be adequate to push it out of an Earth-impacting orbit. However, if the uncertainty of the velocity change was more than a few percent, there would be no chance of directing the asteroid to a particular target. There is also the risk that a nuclear explosion could create a "shotgun effect," shattering the asteroid and pummeling Earth with a spray of fragments that could cause even more widespread damage than a single impact.

Additionally, there are legal concerns regarding the launch of nuclear technology into space. In 1992, the United Nations adopted a resolution that provides strict rules regarding sending nuclear technology to space, including preventing the contamination of space as well as protecting all citizens on Earth from potential fallout. As of 2022, the UN is still considering the safety and legal issues of launching nuclear powered items into outer space, particularly given the expanding field of space travel as more private organizations take part in the modern space race. The UN Committee on Peaceful Uses of Outer Space recently emphasized the point of the previous resolution, saying it is the responsibility of the member states to ensure the safety of everyone regarding nuclear power in space.

== Planetary defense timeline ==
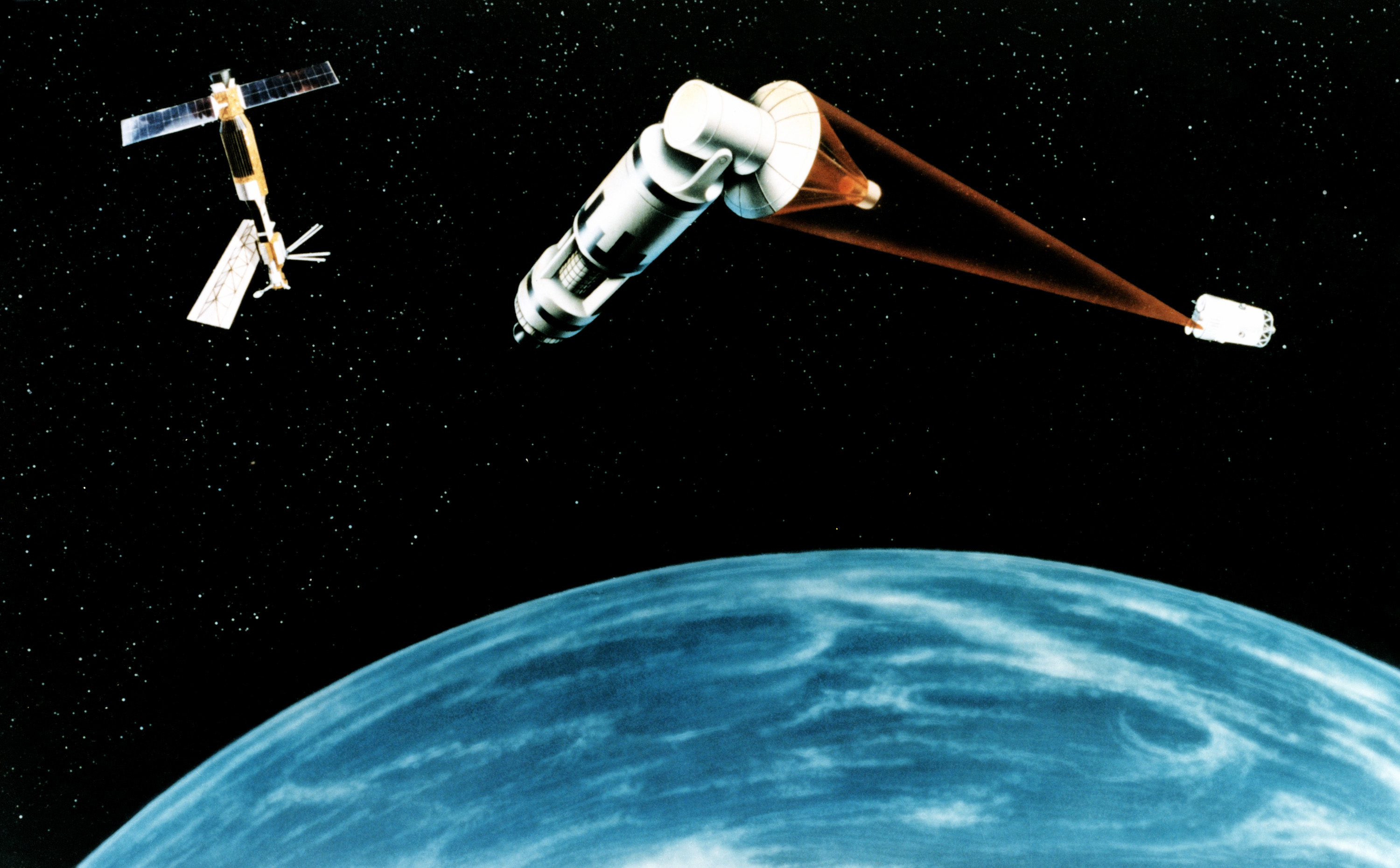
The 1984 US Strategic Defense Initiative concept of a space-based nuclear reactor pumped laser or a hydrogen fluoride laser, firing on a target, causing a momentum change by laser ablation. The proposed Space Station Freedom (predecessor to the ISS) in the background.

- In their 1964 book, Islands in Space, Dandridge M. Cole and Donald W. Cox noted the dangers of planetoid impacts, both those occurring naturally and those that might be brought about with hostile intent. They argued for cataloging the minor planets and developing the technologies to land on, deflect, or even capture planetoids.
- In 1967, students in the Aeronautics and Astronautics department at MIT did a design study, "Project Icarus", of a mission to prevent a hypothetical impact on Earth by asteroid 1566 Icarus. The design project was later published in a book by the MIT Press and received considerable publicity, for the first time bringing asteroid impact into the public eye.
- In the 1980s NASA studied evidence of past strikes on planet Earth, and the risk of this happening at the current level of civilization. This led to a program that maps objects in the Solar System that both cross Earth's orbit and are large enough to cause serious damage if they hit.
- In the 1990s, US Congress held hearings to consider the risks and what needed to be done about them. This led to a US$3 million annual budget for programs like Spaceguard and the near-Earth object program, as managed by NASA and USAF.
- In 2005 a number of astronauts published an open letter through the Association of Space Explorers calling for a united push to develop strategies to protect Earth from the risk of a cosmic collision.
- In 2007 it was estimated that there were approximately 20,000 objects capable of crossing Earth's orbit and large enough (140 meters or larger) to warrant concern. On the average, one of these will collide with Earth every 5,000 years, unless preventive measures are undertaken. It was anticipated that by year 2008, 90% of such objects that are 1 km or more in diameter will have been identified and will be monitored. The further task of identifying and monitoring all such objects of 140m or greater was expected to be complete around 2020. By April 2018, astronomers have spotted more than 8,000 near-Earth asteroids that are at least 460 feet (140 meters) wide and it is estimated about 17,000 such near-Earth asteroids remain undetected. By 2019, the number of discovered near-Earth asteroids of all sizes totaled more than 19,000. An average of 30 new discoveries are added each week.
- The Catalina Sky Survey (CSS) is one of NASA's four funded surveys to carry out a 1998 U.S. Congress mandate to find and catalog by the end of 2008, at least 90 percent of all near-Earth objects (NEOs) larger than 1 kilometer across. CSS discovered over 1150 NEOs in years 2005 to 2007. In doing this survey they discovered on November 20, 2007, an asteroid, designated 2007 WD_{5}, which initially was estimated to have a chance of hitting Mars on January 30, 2008, but further observations during the following weeks allowed NASA to rule out an impact. NASA estimated a near miss by 26,000 kilometers (16,000 mi).
- In January 2012, after a near pass-by of object 2012 BX34, a paper entitled "A Global Approach to Near-Earth Object Impact Threat Mitigation" was released by researchers from Russia, Germany, the United States, France, Britain, and Spain, which discusses the "NEOShield" project.
- In November 2021, NASA launched a program with a different goal in terms of planetary defense. Many common methods previously in place were meant to completely destroy the asteroid. However, NASA and many others believed this method was far too unreliable so they funded the Double Asteroid Redirection Test or (DART) mission. This mission launched a small unmanned spacecraft to crash into the asteroid to break it up, or to deflect the rock away from Earth.
- In January 2022, The NASA-funded Asteroid Terrestrial-impact Last Alert System (ATLAS)—a state-of-the-art asteroid detection system operated by the University of Hawaiʻi (UH) Institute for Astronomy (IfA) for the agency's Planetary Defense Coordination Office (PDCO)—has reached a new milestone by becoming the first survey capable of searching the entire dark sky every 24 hours for near-Earth objects (NEOs) that could pose a future impact hazard to Earth. Now comprising four telescopes, ATLAS has expanded its reach to the southern hemisphere from the two existing northern-hemisphere telescopes on Haleakalā and Maunaloa in Hawaiʻi to include two additional observatories in South Africa and Chile.
- As of March 1, 2023, data from the DART asteroid collision showed the kinetic method could successfully move an asteroid with a diameter up to half a mile.

== See also ==
- 2024 YR4
- Asteroid impact prediction
- Asteroid Redirect Mission
- Asteroid Day
- Asteroids in fiction
- B612 Foundation
- Colonization of the Moon
- Framework Programmes for Research and Technological Development
- Global catastrophic risk
- Gravity tractor
- Lost minor planet
- Near-Earth Asteroid Scout
- Near-Earth object
- Potentially hazardous object
- United States Space Force
