= Gravity tractor =

Type of theoretical spacecraft

A gravity tractor is a theoretical spacecraft that would deflect another object in space, typically a potentially hazardous asteroid that might impact Earth, without physically contacting it, using only its gravitational field to transmit the required impulse. The gravitational force of a nearby space vehicle, though small, is able to alter the path of a much larger asteroid if the vehicle spends enough time close to it; all that is required is that the vehicle thrust in a consistent direction relative to the asteroid's path, and that neither the vehicle nor its expelled reaction mass comes in direct contact with the asteroid. The tractor spacecraft could either hover near the object being deflected, or orbit it, directing its exhaust perpendicular to the plane of the orbit.

The concept has two key advantages: namely that essentially nothing needs to be known about the mechanical composition and structure of the asteroid in advance; and that the relatively small amounts of force used enable extremely precise manipulation and determination of the asteroid's orbit around the Sun. Whereas other methods of deflection would require the determination of the asteroid's exact center of mass, and considerable effort might be necessary to halt its spin or rotation, by using the tractor method these considerations are irrelevant.

== Advantages ==
A number of considerations arise concerning means for avoiding a devastating collision with an asteroidal object, should one be discovered on a trajectory that was determined to lead to Earth impact at some future date. One of the main challenges is how to transmit the impulse required (possibly quite large), to an asteroid of unknown mass, composition, and mechanical strength, without shattering it into fragments, some of which might be themselves dangerous to Earth if left in a collision orbit. The gravity tractor solves this problem by gently accelerating the object as a whole over an extended period of time, using the spacecraft's own mass and associated gravitational field to effect the necessary deflecting force. Because of the universality of gravitation, affecting as it does all mass alike, the asteroid would be accelerated almost uniformly as a whole, with only tidal forces (which should be extremely small) causing any stresses to its internal structure.

A further advantage is that a transponder on the spacecraft, by continuously monitoring the position and velocity of the tractor/asteroid system, could enable the post-deflection trajectory of the asteroid to be accurately known, ensuring its final placement into a safe orbit.

== Limitations ==
Limitations of the tractor concept include the exhaust configuration. With the most efficient hovering design (that is, pointing the exhaust directly at the target object for maximum force per unit of fuel), the expelled reaction mass hits the target head-on, imparting a force in exactly the opposite direction to the gravitational pull of the tractor. It would therefore be necessary to use the orbiting-tractor scheme described below, or else design the hovering tractor so that its exhaust is directed at a slight angle away from the object, while still pointing "down" enough to keep a steady hover. This requires greater thrust and correspondingly increased fuel consumption for each metre per second change in the target's velocity.

Issues of the effect of ion propulsion thrust on the dust of asteroids have been raised, suggesting that alternative means to control the station-keeping position of the gravity tractor may need to be considered. In this respect, solar sails have been suggested.

According to Rusty Schweickart, the gravitational tractor method is also controversial because during the process of changing an asteroid's trajectory the point on Earth where it could most likely hit would be slowly shifted across different countries. It means that the threat for the entire planet would be minimized at the cost of some specific states' security. In Schweickart's opinion, choosing the way the asteroid should be "dragged" would be a tough diplomatic decision.

== Example ==
If a NEO of size around 100 m, and mass of one million metric tons, threatened to impact Earth, and a velocity correction of 1 centimetre per second would be adequate to place it in a safe and stable orbit, missing Earth, then the correction would need to be applied over a period of 10 years.

With these parameters, the required impulse would be: V × M = 0.01 m/s × 10^{9} kg = 10^{7} N-s, so that the average tractor force on the asteroid for 10 years (which is 3.156×10^{8} seconds), would need to be about 0.032 newtons. An ion-electric spacecraft with a specific impulse of 10,000 N-s per kg, corresponding to an ion beam velocity of 10 kilometres per second (about 20 times that obtained with the best chemical rockets), would require 1,000 kg of reaction mass (xenon is currently favored) to provide the impulse. The kinetic power of the ion beam would then be approximately 158 watts; the input electric power to the power converter and ion drive would of course be substantially higher. The spacecraft would need to have enough mass and remain sufficiently close to the asteroid that the component of the average gravitational force on the asteroid in the desired direction would equal or exceed the required 0.032 newtons. Assuming the spacecraft is hovering over the asteroid at a distance of 200 m to its centre of mass, that would require it to have a mass of about 20 metric tonnes, because due to the gravitational force we have

$m_2 = \frac{F r^2}{G m_1} =\frac{0.032\ N \times (200\ m)^2}{6.674 \times 10^{-11}\ N\!\cdot\!m^2\!\cdot\!kg^{-2} \times 10^9\ kg} \approx 19200\ kg$

Considering possible hovering positions or orbits of the tractor around the asteroid, note that if two objects are gravitationally bound in a mutual orbit, then if one receives an arbitrary impulse which is less than that needed to free it from orbit around the other, because of the gravitational forces between them, the impulse will alter the momentum of both, together regarded as a composite system. That is, so long as the tractor remains in a bound orbit, any propulsive force applied to it will be effectively transferred to the asteroid it orbits. This permits a wide variety of orbits or hovering strategies for the tractor. One obvious possibility is for the spacecraft to orbit the NEO with the normal to the orbit in the direction of the desired force. The ion beam would then be directed in the opposite direction, also perpendicular to the orbit plane. This would result in the plane of the orbit being shifted somewhat away from the center of the asteroid, "towing" it, while the orbital velocity, normal to the thrust, remains constant. The orbital period would be a few hours, essentially independent of size, but weakly dependent on the density of the target body.

The Asteroid Redirect Mission vehicle could test the gravity tractor planetary defense technique on a hazardous-size asteroid. The gravity tractor method leverages the mass of the spacecraft to impart a gravitational force on the asteroid, slowly altering the asteroid's trajectory.
