= Sentinel Space Telescope =

Killer asteroid detector canceled as of 2017

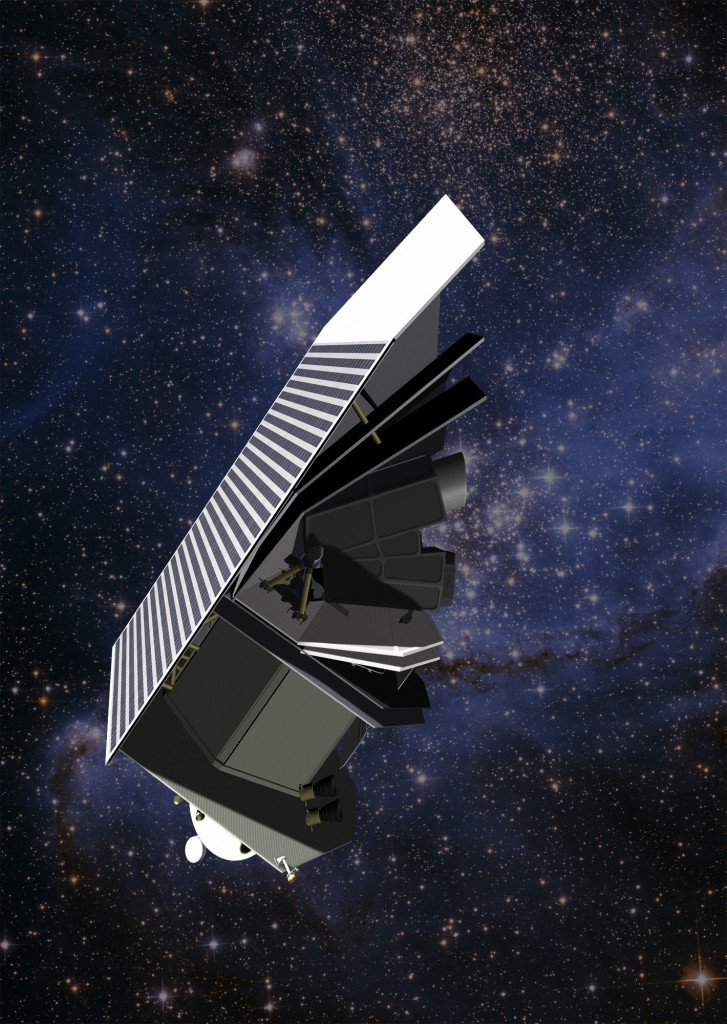
- Artist rendering of the Sentinel Space Telescope
- Mission type: Space Telescope
- Operator: B612 Foundation
- Website: SentinelMission.org at the Wayback Machine (archived 8 October 2015)
- Mission duration: ≤10 years (planned)

Spacecraft properties
- Manufacturer: Ball Aerospace
- Launch mass: 1,500 kg (3,300 lb)

Start of mission
- Launch date: Cancelled
- Rocket: Falcon 9

Orbital parameters
- Reference system: Heliocentric

Main telescope
- Wavelengths: 7–15 μm

Instruments
- IRAC; IRS

The Sentinel Space Telescope was a space observatory to be developed by Ball Aerospace & Technologies for the B612 Foundation. The B612 Foundation is dedicated to protecting the Earth from dangerous asteroid strikes and Sentinel was to be the Foundation's first spacecraft tangibly to address that mission.

The space telescope was intended to locate and catalog 90% of the asteroids greater than 140 metres (460 ft) in diameter that exist in near-Earth orbits. The telescope would have orbited the Sun in a Venus-like orbit (i.e. between Earth and the Sun). This orbit would allow it clearly to view the night half of the sky every 20 days, and pick out objects that are often difficult, if not impossible, to see in advance from Earth." Sentinel would have had an operational mission life of six and a half to ten years.

After NASA terminated their funding agreement with the B612 Foundation in October 2015 and the private fundraising goals could not be met, the Foundation eventually opted for an alternative approach using a constellation of much smaller spacecraft under study as of June 2017. NASA/JPL's NEOCam has been proposed instead.

== History ==
The B612 project grew out of a one-day workshop on asteroid deflection organized by Piet Hut and Ed Lu at NASA Johnson Space Center, Houston, Texas on October 20, 2001. Participants Rusty Schweickart, Clark Chapman, Piet Hut, and Ed Lu established the B612 Foundation on October 7, 2002. The Foundation originally planned to launch Sentinel by December 2016 and to begin data retrieval no later than 6 months after successful positioning. In April 2013, the plan had moved out to launching on a SpaceX Falcon 9 in 2018, following preliminary design review in 2014, and critical design review in 2015.

As of April 2013, B612 was attempting to raise approximately $450 million in total to fund the development and launch cost of Sentinel, at a rate of some $30 to $40 million per year. That funding profile excludes the advertised 2018 launch date.

=== Cancellation ===
After NASA terminated their $30 million funding agreement with the B612 Foundation in October 2015 and the private fundraising did not achieve its goals, the Foundation eventually opted for an alternative approach using a constellation of much smaller spacecraft which is under study as of June 2017. NASA/JPL's NEOCam has been proposed instead.

== Mission ==
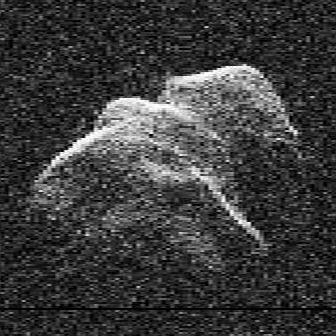
A radar image of 4179 Toutatis, a potentially hazardous asteroid

Unlike similar projects to search for near-Earth asteroids or near-Earth objects (NEOs) such as NASA's Near-Earth Object Program, Sentinel would have orbited between Earth and the Sun. Since the Sun would therefore always have been behind the lens of the telescope, it would have never inhibited the telescope's ability to detect NEOs and Sentinel would have been able to perform continuous observation and analysis.

Sentinel was anticipated to be capable of detecting 90% of the asteroids greater than 140 meters in diameter that exist in Earth's orbit, which pose existential risk to humanity. The B612 Foundation estimates that approximately half a million asteroids in Earth's neighbourhood equal or exceed the one that struck Tunguska in 1908. It was planned to be launched atop the Falcon 9 rocket designed and manufactured by the private aerospace company SpaceX in 2019, and to be maneuvered into position with the help of the gravity of Venus. Data gathered by the Sentinel Project would have been provided through an existing network of scientific data-sharing that includes NASA and academic institutions such as the Minor Planet Center in Cambridge, Massachusetts.

Given the satellite's telescopic accuracy, Sentinel's data was speculated to prove valuable for future missions in such fields as asteroid mining.

== Specifications ==
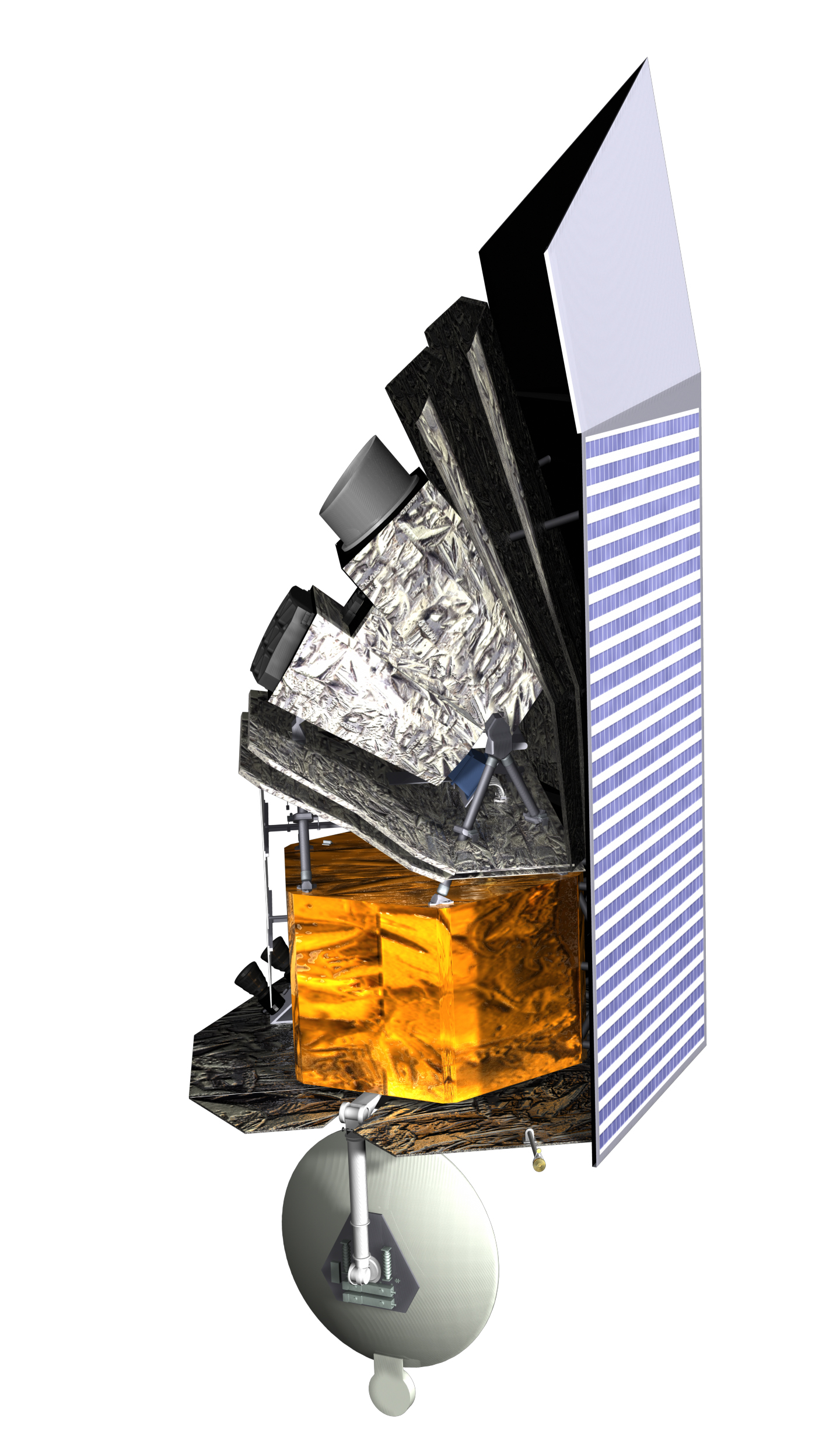
A diagram of Sentinel, with the heat reflector to its right side, and the supercooled infrared telescope positioned over its gold-foil covered spacecraft bus

The telescope was intended to measure 7.7 metres (25 ft) by 3.2 metres (10 ft) with a mass of 1,500 kilograms (3,300 lb) and would have orbited the Sun at a distance of 0.6 to 0.8 astronomical units (90,000,000 to 120,000,000 km; 56,000,000 to 74,000,000 mi) approximately in the same orbital distance as Venus. It would have employed infrared astronomy methods to identify asteroids against the cold of outer space. The B612 Foundation worked in partnership with Ball Aerospace to construct Sentinel's 0.51 m (20 inches) aluminum mirror, which would have captured the large field of view. "Sentinel will scan in the 7- to 15-micron wavelength using a 0.5-meter infrared telescope across a 5.5 by 2-deg. field of view. The [infrared] IR array would have consisted of 16 detectors, and coverage would have scanned a 200-degree, full-angle field of regard."

=== Features ===
Key features included:

- Most capable NEO detection system in operation;
- 200 degree anti-sun field of regard, with a 2×5.5 degree field of view at any point in time: scans 165 square degrees per hour looking for moving objects;
- Precise pointing accuracy to sub-pixel resolution for imaging revisit, using the detector fine steering capability;
- Designed for highly autonomous, reliable operation requiring only weekly ground contact;
- Designed for 6.5 to 10 years of surveying operations. Actively cooled to 40K using a Ball Aerospace two-stage, closed-cycle Stirling-cycle cryocooler;
- Ability to follow up on objects of interest.

== Issues ==
REP. STEWART: ... are we technologically capable of launching something that could intercept [an asteroid]? ... DR. A'HEARN: No. If we had spacecraft plans on the books already, that would take a year ... I mean a typical small mission ... takes four years from approval to start to launch ...

— Rep. Chris Stewart (R, UT) and Dr. Michael F. A'Hearn, 10 April 2013, United States Congress

== See also ==
- 4179 Toutatis
- Asteroid deflection
- Asteroid mining
- Asteroid Terrestrial-impact Last Alert System (ATLAS)
- B612 Foundation
- Lists of telescopes
- Near-Earth Object Surveillance Mission
- NEOShield
- Spaceguard
- Spaceguard Foundation
