= NEO Surveyor =

Space-based infrared telescope

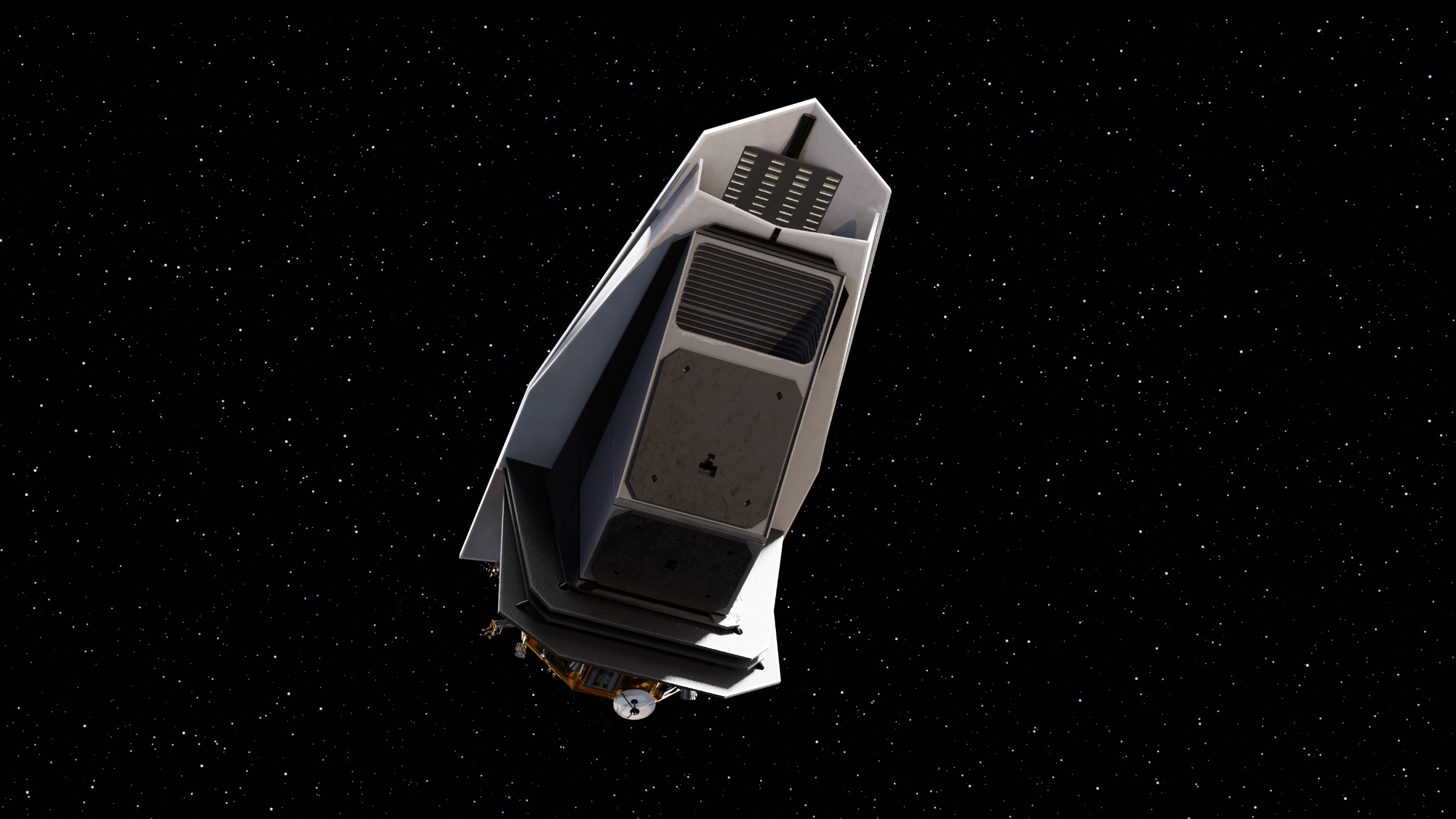
- Artist's concept of the NEO Surveyor spacecraft
- Names: Near-Earth Object Surveillance Mission; Near-Earth Object Camera; NEOCam
- Mission type: Asteroid impact avoidance, astronomy
- Operator: NASA / JPL
- Website: https://neos.epss.ucla.edu/
- Mission duration: 12 years (planned)

Spacecraft properties
- Manufacturer: Jet Propulsion Laboratory
- Launch mass: 1,300 kg (2,900 lb)

Start of mission
- Launch date: September 2027 (planned)
- Rocket: Falcon 9 Block 5
- Launch site: Kennedy, LC‑39A or Cape Canaveral, SLC‑40
- Contractor: SpaceX

Orbital parameters
- Reference system: Heliocentric orbit
- Regime: Sun–Earth L_{1}

Main telescope
- Diameter: 50 cm (20 in)
- Wavelengths: Infrared (4–5.2 and 6–10 μm)

NEO Surveyor, formerly called Near-Earth Object Camera (NEOCam), then NEO Surveillance Mission, is a planned space-based infrared telescope designed to survey the Solar System for potentially hazardous asteroids.

The NEO Surveyor spacecraft will survey from the Sun–Earth L_{1} (inner) Lagrange point, allowing it to see objects inside Earth's orbit, and its mid-infrared detectors sensitive to thermal emission will detect asteroids independently of their reflected sunlight. The NEO Surveyor mission will be a successor to the NEOWISE mission, and the two missions have the same principal investigator, Amy Mainzer at the University of California, Los Angeles.

Since first proposed in 2006, the concept repeatedly competed unsuccessfully for NASA funding against science missions unrelated to planetary defense, despite an unfunded 2005 US Congressional directive to NASA. In 2019, the Planetary Defense Coordination Office decided to fund this mission outside NASA's science budget due to its national security implications. On 11 June 2021, NASA authorized the NEO Surveyor mission to proceed to the preliminary design phase. The Jet Propulsion Laboratory will lead development of the mission.

As of February 2025, NASA planned to launch NEO Surveyor on a SpaceX Falcon 9 in September 2027.

== History ==
In 2005, the U.S. Congress mandated NASA to achieve by the year 2020 specific levels of search completeness for discovering, cataloging, and characterizing dangerous asteroids larger than 140 m (460 ft) (Act of 2005, H.R. 1022; 109th), but it never appropriated specific funds for this effort. NASA did not prioritize this unfunded mandate, and directed the NEOCam project to compete against science missions for general funds not earmarked for planetary defense and disaster mitigation planning.

Proposals for NEOCam were submitted to NASA's Discovery Program in 2006, 2010, 2015, 2016 and 2017, but each time were not selected for launch. The mission concept nonetheless received technology development funding in 2010 to design and test new infrared detectors optimized for asteroid and comet detection and sizing. The project received additional funding for further technological development in September 2015 (US$3 million), and in January 2017.

Following calls to fully fund the mission outside NASA's Planetary Science Division or directly from Congress itself, NASA's associate administrator for science announced on 23 September 2019 that instead of competing for funding, NEOCam will be implemented under the name NEO Surveillance Mission with budget from NASA's Planetary Defense Coordination Office, within the Planetary Science Division. The near-miss of asteroid 2019 OK, which slipped past extant detection methods in July 2019, has been suggested to have helped prompt this decision.

For funding and management purposes, the NEO Surveillance Mission is officially a new project, but it is the same space telescope, the same team, and the mission's goals remain unchanged.

On February 11, 2025 the mission passed its critical design review, moving the project towards construction and testing.

== Objectives ==
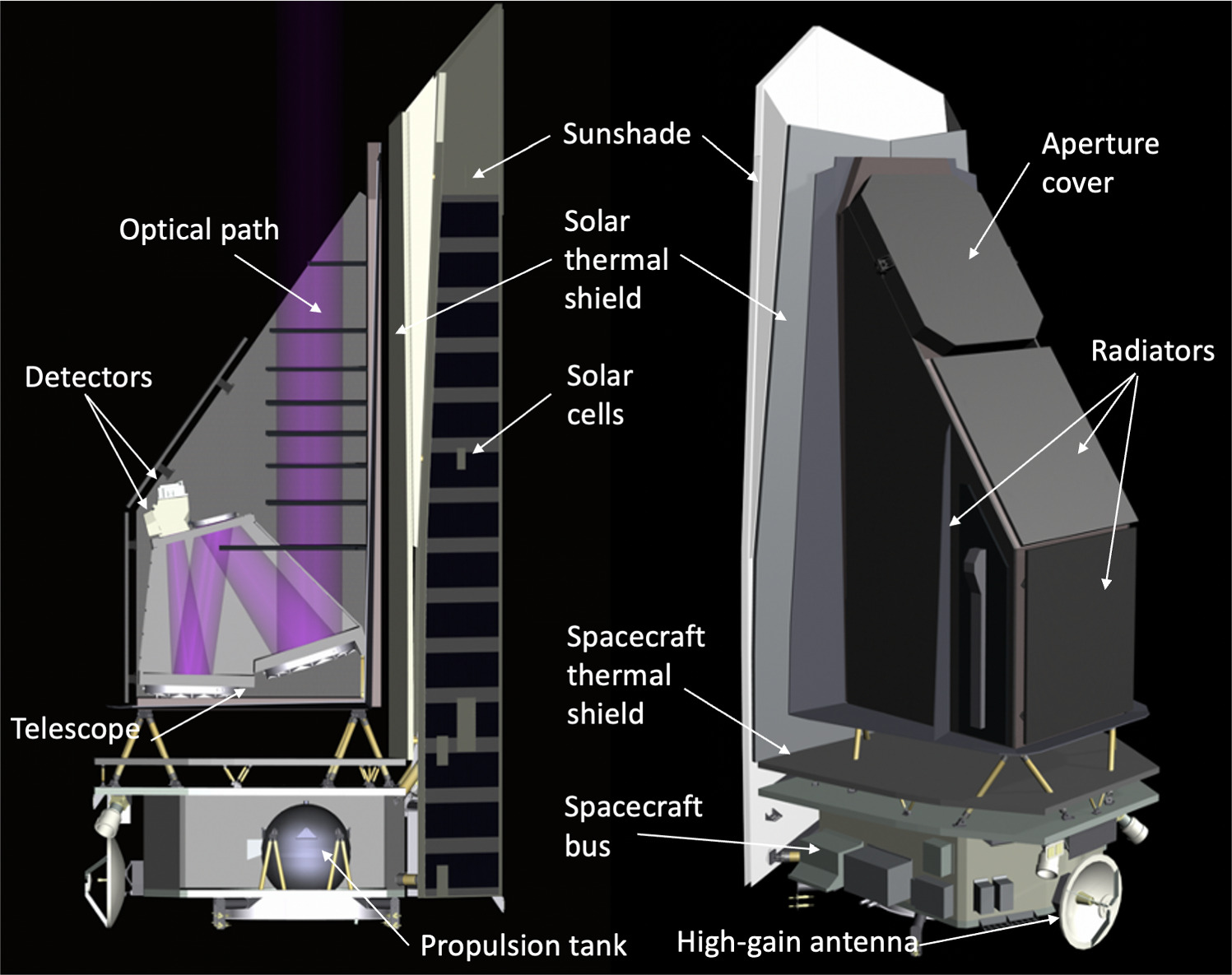
NEO Surveyor spacecraft scheme

The main objective of the mission is to discover most of the potentially hazardous asteroids larger than 140 m (460 ft) over the course of its mission and characterize their orbits. Its field of view and its sensitivity will be wide and deep enough to allow the mission to discover about 200,000 to 300,000 new NEOs with sizes as small as 10 m (33 ft) in diameter. Secondary science goals include detection and characterization of approximately one million asteroids in the asteroid belt and thousands of comets, as well as identification of potential NEO targets for human and robotic exploration.

The Jet Propulsion Laboratory (JPL) leads the development of the mission. The total cost of the mission is estimated to be between US$500 million and US$600 million. The mission has a development cost baseline of $1.2 billion.

On the NEO Surveyor website the following mission requirements are stated:

- Find 2/3 of Asteroids Larger than 140 Meters in Diameter
- Assess the Overall Threat Posed by Potential Earth Impactors
- Assess the Impact Threat Posed by Comets
- Determine Orbits and Physical Characteristics of Specific Discovered Objects

== Spacecraft ==
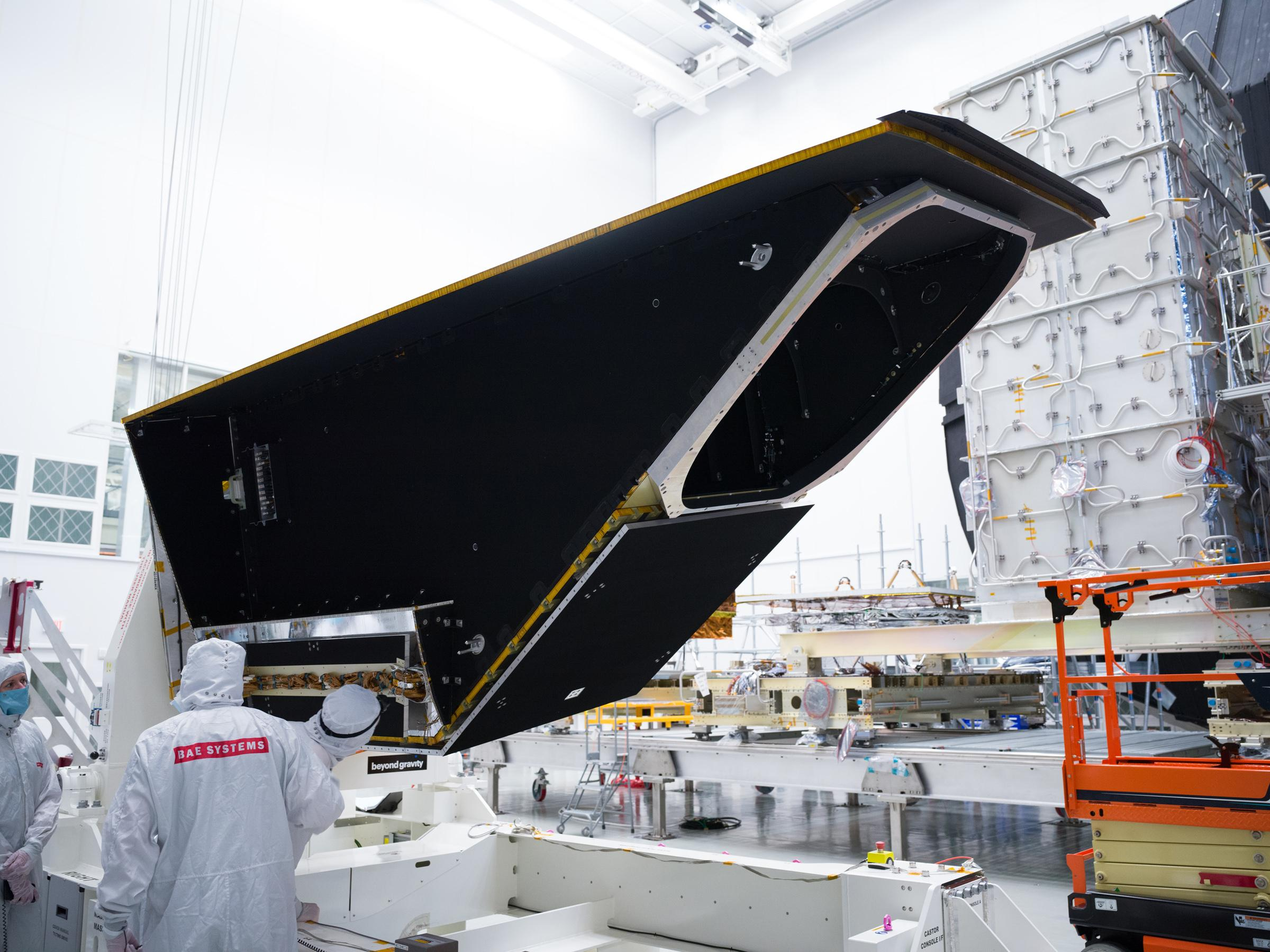
The instrument enclosure for NEO Surveyor is prepared for environmental testing inside the Chamber A in the Space Environment Simulation Laboratory at the NASA Johnson Space Center

The NEO Surveyor spacecraft will have a total mass of no more than 1,300 kg (2,900 lb), allowing it to launch on a vehicle like a Falcon 9 Block 5 to the Sun–Earth L_{1} Lagrange point. The mission should reach the 90% congressional goal within 10 years, with an anticipated mission lifetime of 12 years.

== Telescope and camera ==
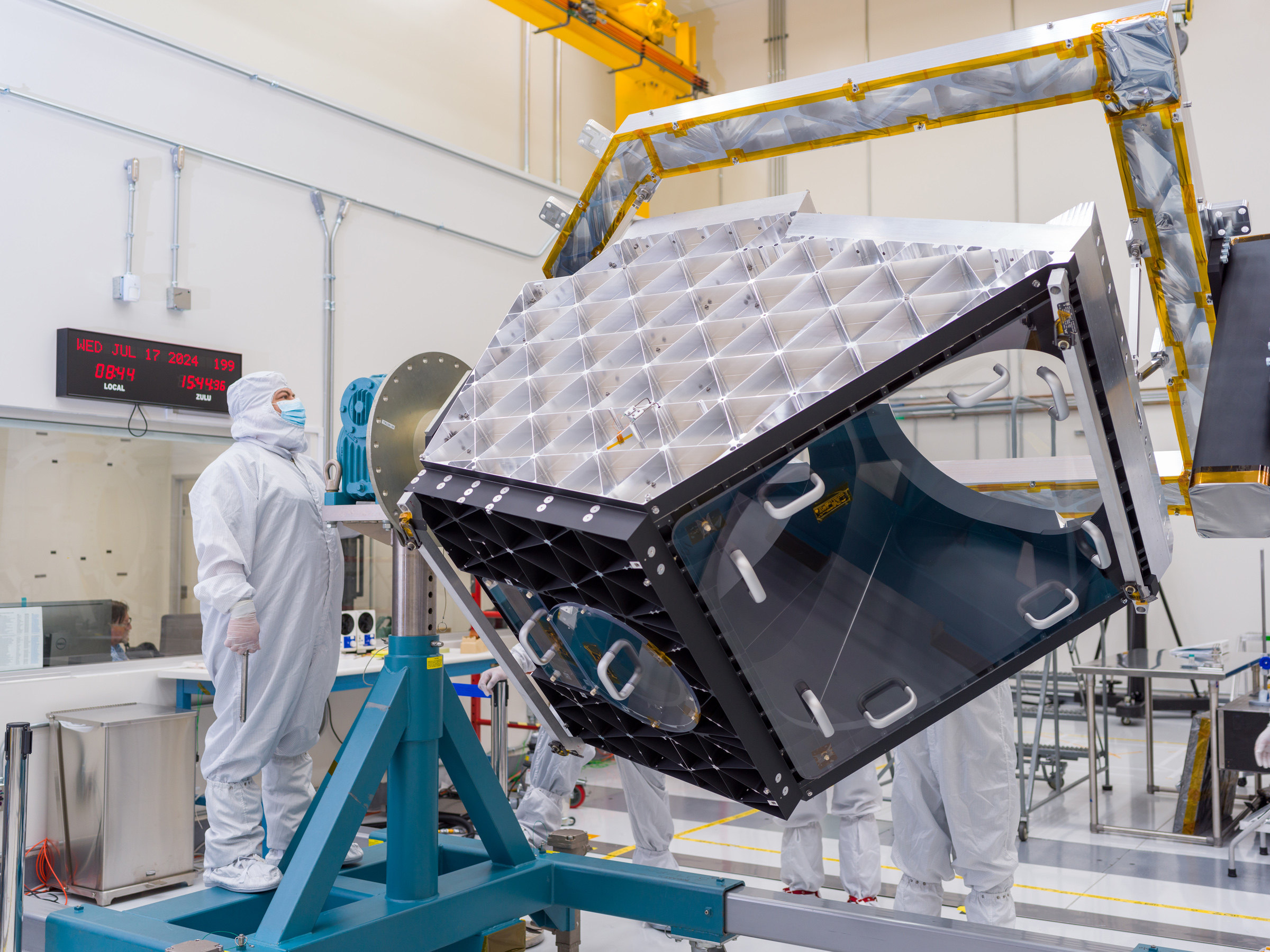
Telescope Optical Bench

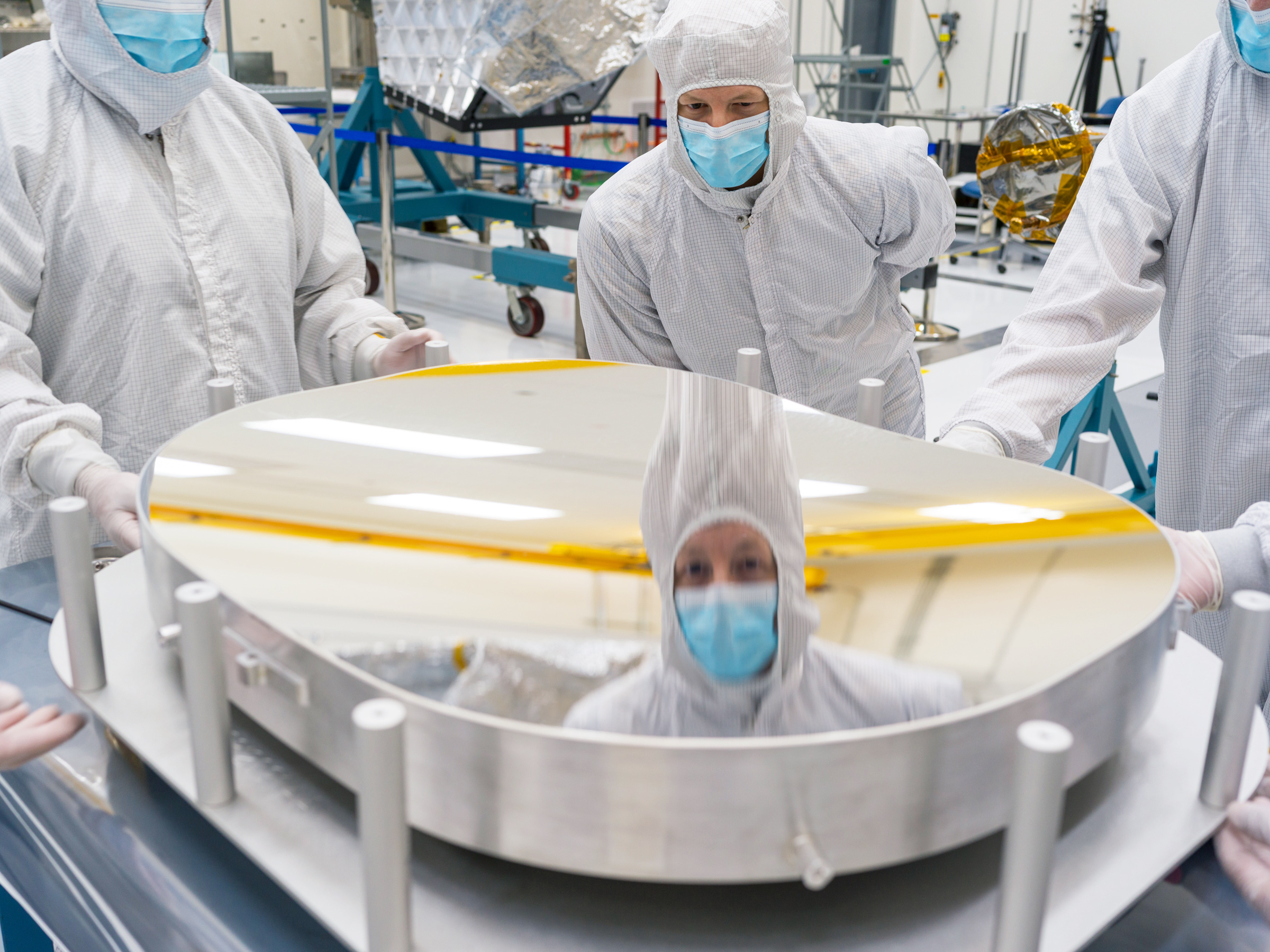
NEO Surveyor's mirror

Asteroids are dark, with albedos of at most 30% and as low as 5%. An optical telescope looks for the light they reflect and can therefore only see them when looking away from the Sun at the sunlit side of the asteroids, and not when looking towards the Sun at the unlit backside of the object. In addition, opposition surge makes asteroids even brighter when the Earth is close to the axis of sunlight, and the sky on Earth is much brighter in daytime. The combined effect is equivalent to the comparison of a Full moon at night to a New Moon in daytime, and the light of the Sun-lit asteroids has been called "full asteroid" similar to a "full moon". A telescope operating at thermal infrared wavelengths instead detects their surfaces that have been warmed by the Sun and is almost equally sensitive to their lit and unlit sides, but needs to operate in space to achieve good sensitivity over a wide field of view.

The NEO Surveillance Mission will employ a 50 cm (20 in) infrared telescope operating wide-field cameras at two thermal infrared wavelength channels for a total wavelength range between 4 μm and 10 μm. The camera will have two channels: NC1 has a wavelength range of 4–5.2 μm and NC2 spans 6–10 μm. NC1 is intended to detect background stars for astrometric registration and calibration, as well as the measurement of effective temperatures. NC2 is optimized to maximize sensitivity to typical NEO thermal emission at 200-300 K. Its field of view is 11.56 square degrees. It will use a version of the Astronomical Wide Area Infrared Imager (HAWAII) mercury–cadmium–telluride detector modified by Teledyne Imaging Sensors for optimal sensitivity in the NC1 and NC2 bands. The mission prototype detector was successfully tested in April 2013. The detector array is 2,048 × 2,048 pixels and will produce 82 gigabits of data per day. For good infrared performance without the use of cryogenic fluid refrigeration, the detector will be passively cooled to 30 K (−243.2 °C; −405.7 °F) using techniques proven by the Spitzer Space Telescope. Unlike its predecessor NEOWISE, it will therefore not suffer from a performance degradation due to running out of coolant (its mission duration will however still be limited, as the orbital station keeping needed to maintain its position at Sun–Earth L_{1} uses propellant; also, cosmic radiation will slowly degrade the detectors over time).

== Operations ==
The NEO Surveyor spacecraft will operate in a halo orbit around the Sun–Earth L_{1}, and employ a sunshade. This orbit will allow fast data downlink speeds to Earth, allowing full-frame images to be downloaded from the telescope.

One advantage over NEOWISE is the wide field of regard. NEO Surveyor will be able to point anywhere from 45-120° in longitudinal distance from the sun and stopping at ±40° ecliptic latitude. The survey will be optimized to detect potentially hazardous objects and be performed continuously during the baseline mission (5 years). The survey will be halted each day for 2.25 hours to downlink the data. It will also be halted for calibration, station-keeping and momentum management maneuvers. NEO Surveyor will also be able to conduct targeted follow-up (TFO) to obtain more information for an object of special interest.

It is planned that moving object tracklets are delivered to the Minor Planet Center 2 to 3 times a day, on average 72 hours after their discovery. Additionally deep co-added images are published every 12 months. These deep co-added images most likely will like those of WISE be used by astronomers to study stars, brown dwarfs, and distant galaxies. It was also proposed that NEO Surveyor will include a transient alerting infrastructure, but none had been planned as of October 2023.

In the first 30 days after the launch the in-orbit checkouts will be performed. After arriving at L_{1} NEO Surveyor team will conduct a 6-month survey verification. In the nominal survey the telescope is expected to detect two-thirds of asteroids with a diameter larger than 140 meters in the first 5 years. The nominal mission will last for at least 12 years. After the survey end, the telescope will be decommissioned and put into a heliocentric orbit.

Animation of NEO Surveyor

Around the Earth

Around the Sun - Frame rotating with Earth - Top view

Around the Sun - Frame rotating with Earth - Viewed from the Sun

Earth · NEO Surveyor · L_{1} point

== Images ==
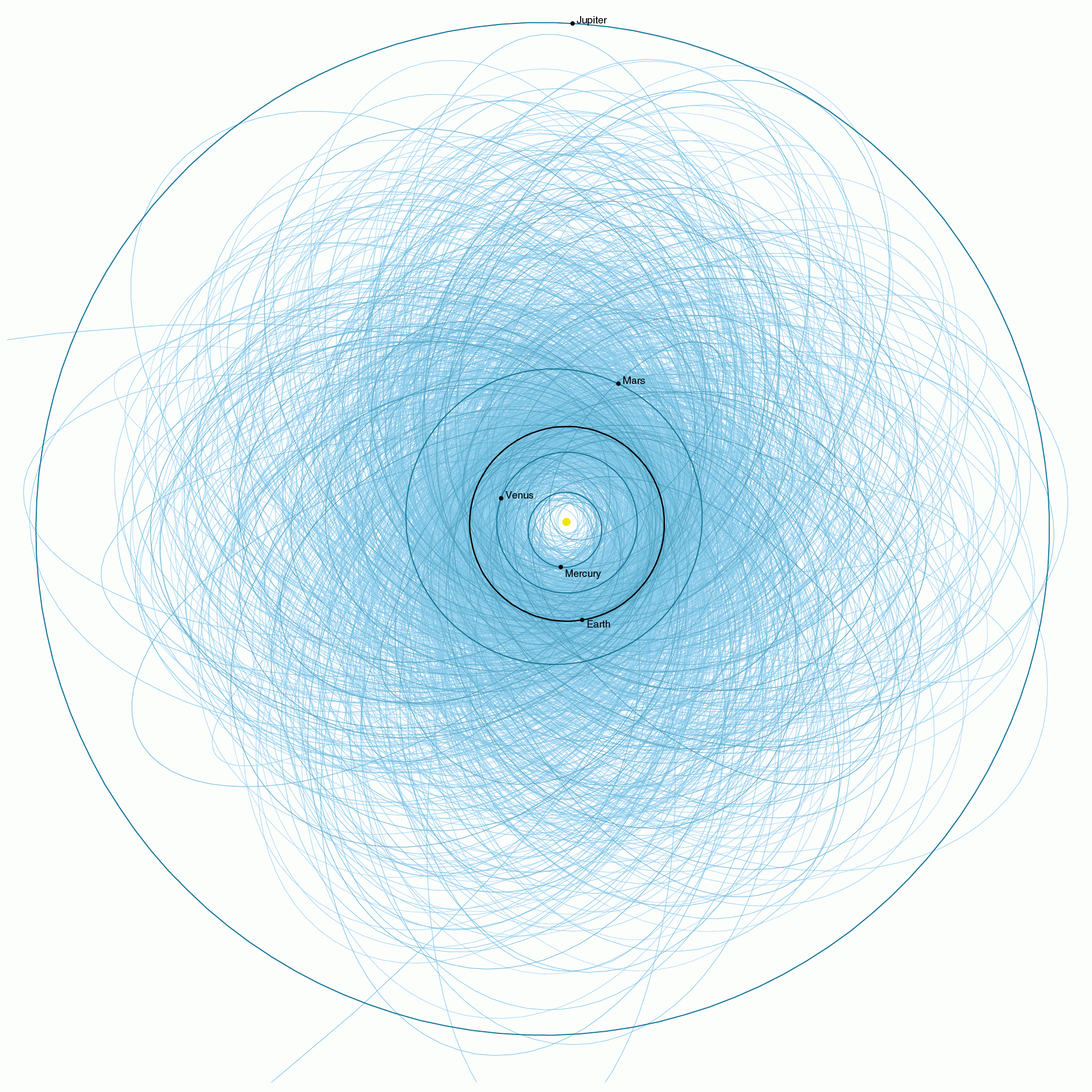
Plot of orbits of known potentially hazardous asteroids (size over 140 m (460 ft) and passing within 7.6×10^{6} km (4.7×10^{6} mi) of Earth's orbit) as of early 2013.(alternate image)

Annually discovered NEAs by survey since 1995

Large NEAs (at least 1 km in diameter) discovered each year

== See also ==
- Asteroid impact prediction
- Asteroid impact avoidance
- List of largest infrared telescopes
- List of near-Earth object observation projects
- Wide-field Infrared Survey Explorer (WISE & NEOWISE)
- List of proposed space observatories
- Spacecraft at Sun–Earth L_{1}

NEOs search projects

- B612 Foundation, an organization that studied NEOs and proposed a similar mission
- Sentinel Space Telescope, B612's failed space telescope proposal similar to NEOSM
- Near Earth Object Surveillance Satellite, a Canadian small satellite intended to detect NEOs
- The Spaceguard Foundation, an organization that attempts to locate NEOs
- Whipple (spacecraft), a proposed space telescope in the Discovery program
- Asteroid Terrestrial-impact Last Alert System, a ground-based NEO detection system funded by NASA since the end of 2015
- NEOMIR, a proposed space telescope by ESA
