= B612 Foundation =

Planetary defense nonprofit organization

- Formation: October 7, 2002
- Founder: Dr. Clark Chapman; Dr. Piet Hut; Dr. Ed Lu; Rusty Schweickart
- Type: 501(c)(3) not-for-profit organization
- Tax ID no.: 54-2078469
- Registration no.: C2467899
- Purpose: Planetary defense
- Location: Mill Valley, California, USA
- Products: Asteroid Institute
- Key people: Dr. Marc Buie, SMS; Tom Gavin, SSRT; Dr. Scott Hubbard, SPA; Dr. David Liddle, BoD; Dr. Ed Lu, Director, Asteroid Institute, Diane Murphy, PR; Dr. Harold Reitsema, SMD; Danica Remy, CEO; John Troeltzsch, SPM
- Website: B612 Foundation

The B612 Foundation is a private nonprofit foundation headquartered in Mill Valley, California, United States, dedicated to planetary science and planetary defense against asteroids and other near-Earth object (NEO) impacts. It is led mainly by scientists, former astronauts and engineers from the Institute for Advanced Study, Southwest Research Institute, Stanford University, NASA and the space industry.

As a non-governmental organization it has conducted two lines of related research to help detect near-Earth objects (NEO) that could one day strike the Earth, and find the technological means to divert their path to avoid such collisions. It also assisted the Association of Space Explorers in helping the United Nations establish the International Asteroid Warning Network, as well as a Space Missions Planning Advisory Group to provide oversight on proposed asteroid deflection missions.

In 2012, the foundation announced it would design and build a privately financed asteroid-finding space observatory, the Sentinel Space Telescope, to be launched in 2017–2018. Once stationed in a heliocentric orbit around the Sun similar to that of Venus, Sentinel's supercooled infrared detector would have helped identify dangerous asteroids and other near-Earth objects that pose a risk of collision with Earth. In the absence of substantive planetary defense provided by governments worldwide, B612 attempted a fundraising campaign to cover the Sentinel Mission, estimated at $450 million for 10 years of operation. Fundraising was unsuccessful, and the program was cancelled in 2017, with the Foundation pursuing a constellation of smaller satellites instead.

The B612 Foundation is named for the asteroid home of the eponymous hero of Antoine de Saint-Exupéry's 1943 book The Little Prince.

== Background ==
When an asteroid enters the planet's atmosphere it becomes known as a 'meteor'; those that survive and fall to the Earth's surface are then called 'meteorites'. While basketball-sized meteors occur almost daily, and compact car-sized ones about yearly, they usually burn up or explode high above the Earth as bolides, (fireballs), often with little notice. During an average 24-hour period, the Earth sweeps through some 100 million particles of interplanetary dust and pieces of cosmic debris, only a very minor amount of which arrives on the ground as meteorites.

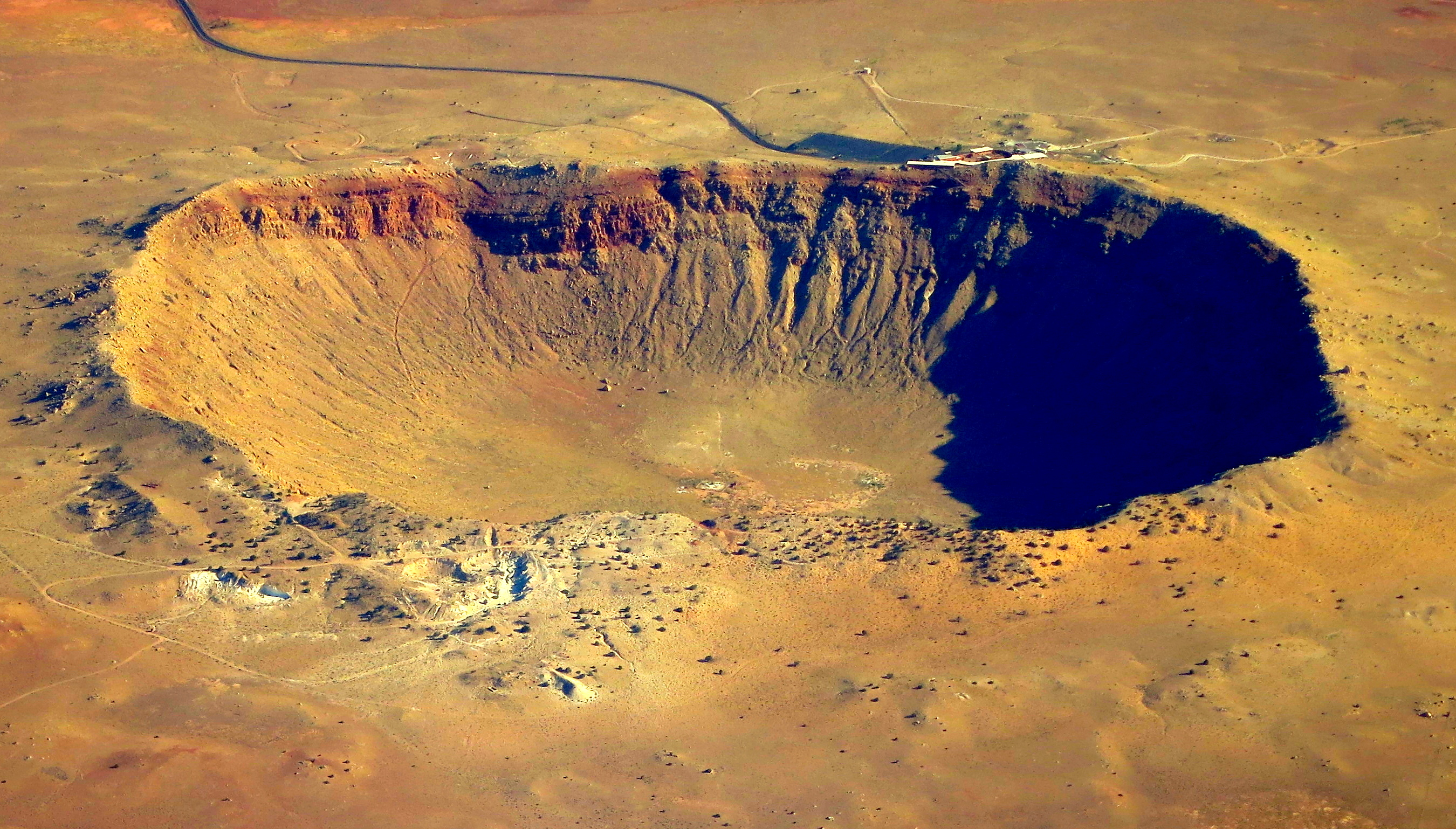
The 1,200 meter-wide Meteor Crater in Arizona, United States, created by a 46 meter-diameter asteroid impact. A visitors centre is visible beyond the far rim.

The larger in size asteroids or other near-Earth objects are, the less frequently they impact the planet's atmosphere—large meteors seen in the skies are extremely rare, while medium-sized ones are less so, and much smaller ones are more commonplace. Although stony asteroids often explode high in the atmosphere, some objects, especially iron-nickel meteors and other types descending at a steep angle, can explode close to ground level or even directly impact onto land or sea. In the U.S. State of Arizona, the 1,200-metre-wide (3,900 ft) Meteor Crater (officially named Barringer Crater) formed in a fraction of a second as nearly 160 million tonnes of limestone and bedrock were uplifted, creating its crater rim on formerly flat terrain. The asteroid that produced the Barringer Crater was only about 46 metres (151 ft) in size; however it impacted the ground at a velocity of 12.8 km/s (29,000 mph) and struck with an impact energy of 10 megatonnes of TNT (42 PJ)—about 625 times greater than the bomb that destroyed the city of Hiroshima during World War II. Tsunamis can also occur after a medium-sized or larger asteroid impacts an ocean surface or other large body of water.

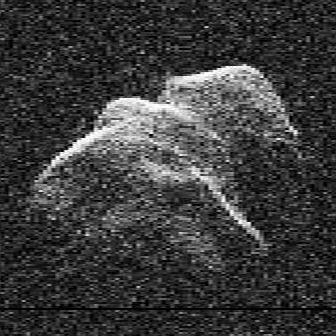
A radar image of the almost 2 km wide Asteroid 4179 Toutatis, one of many objects that could pose a severe catastrophic threat

The probability of a mid-sized asteroid (similar to the one that destroyed the Tunguska River area of Russia in 1908) hitting Earth during the 21st century has been estimated at 30%. Since the Earth is currently more populated than in previous eras, there is a greater risk of large casualties arising from a mid-sized asteroid impact. However, as of the early 2010s, only about a half of one per cent of Tunguska-type near-Earth objects had been located by astronomers using ground-based telescope surveys.

The need for an asteroid detection program has been compared to the need for monsoon, typhoon, and hurricane preparedness. As the B612 Foundation and other organizations have publicly noted, of the different types of natural catastrophes that can occur on our planet, asteroid strikes are the only one that the world now has the technical capability to prevent.

B612 is one of several organizations to propose detailed dynamic surveys of near-Earth objects and preventative measures such as asteroid deflection. Other groups include Chinese researchers, NASA in the United States, NEOShield in Europe, as well as the international Spaceguard Foundation. In December 2009 Roscosmos Russian Federal Space Agency director Anatoly Perminov proposed a deflection mission to the 325-metre-wide (1,066 ft) asteroid 99942 Apophis, which at the time had been thought to pose a risk of collision with Earth.

=== Asteroid deflection workshop ===
The Foundation evolved from an informal one-day workshop on asteroid deflection strategies during October 2001, organized by Dutch astrophysicist Piet Hut along with physicist and then-U.S. astronaut Ed Lu, presented at NASA Johnson Space Center in Houston, Texas. Twenty researchers participated, principally from various NASA facilities plus the non-profit Southwest Research Institute, but as well from the University of California, University of Michigan, and the Institute for Independent Study. All were interested in contributing to the proposed creation of an asteroid deflection capability. The seminar participants included Rusty Schweickart, a former Apollo astronaut, and Clark Chapman, a planetary scientist.

Among the proposed experimental research missions discussed were the alteration of an asteroid's spin rate, as well as changing the orbit of one part of a binary asteroid pair. Following the seminar's round-table discussions the workshop generally agreed that the vehicle of choice (needed to deflect an asteroid) would be powered by a low-thrust ion plasma engine. Landing a nuclear-powered plasma engined pusher vehicle on the asteroid's surface was seen as promising, an early proposal that would later encounter a number of technical obstacles. Nuclear explosives were seen as "too risky and unpredictable" for several reasons, warranting the view that gently altering an asteroid's trajectory was the safest approach—but also a method requiring years of advance warning to successfully accomplish.

== B612 Project and Foundation ==
The October 2001 asteroid deflection workshop participants created the "B612 Project" to further their research. Schweickart, along with Drs. Hut, Lu and Chapman, then formed the B612 Foundation on October 7, 2002, with its first goal being to "significantly alter the orbit of an asteroid in a controlled manner". Schweickart became an early public face of the foundation and served as chairman on its board of directors. In 2010, as part of an ad hoc task force on planetary defense, he advocated increasing NASA's annual budget by $250M–$300 million over a 10-year period (with an operational maintenance budget of up to $75 million per year after that) in order to more fully catalog the near-Earth objects that can pose a threat to Earth, and to also fully develop impact avoidance capabilities. That recommended level of budgetary support would permit up to 10–20 years of advance warning in order to create a sufficient window for the required trajectory deflection.

Their recommendations were made to a NASA Advisory Council, but were ultimately unsuccessful in obtaining Congressional funding due to NASA, lacking a legislated mandate for planetary protection, not being permitted to request it. Feeling it would be imprudent to continue waiting for substantive government or United Nations action, B612 began a fundraising campaign in 2012 to cover the approximate US$450 million cost for the development, launch and operations of an asteroid-finding space telescope, to be called Sentinel, with a goal of raising $30 to $40 million per year. The space observatory's objective would be to accurately survey near-Earth objects from an orbit similar to that of Venus, creating a large dynamic catalog of such objects that would help identify dangerous Earth-impactors, deemed a necessary precursor to mounting any asteroid deflection mission.

"Assessing the Risks, Impacts and Solutions for Space Threats"; testimony before a U.S. Senate Subcommittee on Science & Space, March 2013 (video)

In March and April 2013, several weeks after the Chelyabinsk meteor explosion injured some 1,500 people, the U.S. Congress held hearings for "...the Risks, Impacts and Solutions for Space Threats". They received testimony from B612 head Ed Lu (see video at right), as well as Dr. Donald K. Yeomans, head of NASA's NEO Program Office, Dr. Michael A'Hearn of the University of Maryland and co-chair of a 2009 U.S. National Research Council study on asteroid threats, plus others. The difficulty of quickly intercepting an imminent asteroid threat to Earth was made apparent during the testimony:

REP. STEWART: ... are we technologically capable of launching something that could intercept [an asteroid with 2 years of advance warning]? ...
DR. A'HEARN: No. If we had spacecraft plans on the books already, that would take a year—I mean a typical small mission ... takes four years from approval to start to launch ...

— Representative Chris Stewart (Republican–Utah) and Dr. Michael F. A'Hearn, April 10, 2013, United States Congress

As a result of a set of hearings by the NASA Advisory Committee following the Chelyabinsk explosion in 2013, in conjunction with a White House request to double its budget, NASA's Near Earth Object Program funding was increased to $40.5 M/year in its FY2014 (Fiscal Year 2014) budget. It had previously been increased to $20.5 M/year in FY2012 (about 0.1% of NASA's annual budget at the time), from an average of about $4 M/year between 2002 and 2010.

=== Asteroid hazard reassessment ===
On Earth Day, April 22, 2014, the B612 Foundation formally presented a revised assessment on the frequency of "city-killer" type impact events, based on research led by Canadian planetary scientist Peter Brown of the University of Western Ontario's (UWO) Centre for Planetary Science and Exploration. Dr. Brown's analysis, "A 500-Kiloton Airburst Over Chelyabinsk and An Enhanced Hazard from Small Impactors", published in the journals Science and Nature, was used to produce a short computer-animated video that was presented to the media at the Seattle Museum of Flight.

The nearly one-and-a-half-minute video displayed a rotating globe with the impact points of about 25 asteroids measuring more than one, and up to 600 kilotons of blast force, that struck the Earth from 2000 to 2013 (for comparison, the nuclear bomb that destroyed Hiroshima was equivalent to about 16 kilotons of TNT blast force). Of those impacts between 2000 and 2013, eight of them were as large, or larger, than the Hiroshima bomb. Only one of the asteroids, 2008 TC_{3}, was detected in advance, some 19 hours before exploding in the atmosphere. As was the case with the 2013 Chelyabinsk meteor, no warnings were issued for any of the other impacts. (Note: 2008 TC_{3}, an 80-tonne, 4.1-meter-diameter (13 ft) asteroid, entered Earth's atmosphere on October 7, 2008, and exploded over the Nubian Desert in Sudan. It was the first time an asteroid impact had been predicted prior to its entry into the atmosphere as a meteor, and its discovery and impact prediction were considered a "remarkable feat" considering its small four-meter size. The asteroid was identified about 19 hours before impact by Richard Kowalski of the Catalina Sky Survey near Tucson, Arizona, in the United States. Although officials in the U.S. Government were advised of the impending impact, no warning was provided to the Sudanese Government. According to Donald Yeomans, head of NASA's Near Earth Objects Program at the Jet Propulsion Laboratory, "NASA alerted the White House, the National Security Council, the Pentagon, the State Department, and the Department of Homeland Security... But no one from the United States alerted Sudan because the two countries did not have diplomatic relations".)

At the presentation, alongside former NASA astronauts Dr. Tom Jones and Apollo 8 astronaut Bill Anders, Foundation head Ed Lu explained that the frequency of dangerous asteroid impacts hitting Earth was from three to ten times greater than previously believed a dozen or so years ago (earlier estimates had pegged the odds as one per 300,000 years). The latest reassessment is based on worldwide infrasound signatures recorded under the auspices of the Comprehensive Nuclear-Test-Ban Treaty Organization, which monitors the planet for nuclear explosions. Dr. Brown's UWO study used infrasound signals generated by asteroids that released more than a kiloton of TNT explosive force. The study suggested that "city-killer" type impact events similar to the Tunguska event of 1908 actually occur on average about once a century instead of every thousand years, as was once previously believed. The 1908 event occurred in the remote, sparsely populated Tunguska area of Siberia, Russia, and is attributed to the likely airburst explosion of an asteroid or comet that destroyed some 30 million trees over 2,150 square kilometres (830 sq mi) of forests. The higher frequency of these types of events is interpreted as meaning that "blind luck" has mainly prevented a catastrophic impact over an inhabited area that could kill millions, a point made near the video's end.

=== 99942 Apophis ===
During the first decade of the 2000s, there were serious concerns the 325 metres (1,066 ft) wide asteroid 99942 Apophis posed a risk of impacting Earth in 2036. Preliminary, incomplete data by astronomers using ground-based sky surveys resulted in the calculation of a Level 4 risk on the Torino Scale impact hazard chart. In July 2005, B612 formally asked NASA to investigate the possibility that the asteroid's post-2029 orbit could be in orbital resonance with Earth, which would increase the likelihood of a future impact. The Foundation also asked NASA to investigate whether a transponder should be placed on the asteroid to enable more accurate tracking of how its orbit would be changed by the Yarkovsky effect.

By 2008, B612 had provided estimates on a 30 kilometers-wide corridor, called a "path of risk", that would extend across the Earth's surface if an impact were to occur, as part of its effort to develop viable deflection strategies. The calculated risk-path extended from Kazakhstan across southern Russia through Siberia, across the Pacific, then right between Nicaragua and Costa Rica, crossing northern Colombia and Venezuela, and ending in the Atlantic just before reaching Africa. At that time, a computer simulation estimated Apophis's hypothetical impact in countries, such as Colombia and Venezuela, could have resulted in more than 10 million casualties. Alternately, an impact in the Atlantic or Pacific oceans could produce a deadly tsunami over 240 metres (about 800 ft) in height, capable of destroying many coastal areas and cities.

A series of later, more accurate observations of 99942 Apophis, combined with the recovery of previously unseen data, revised the odds of a collision in 2036 as being virtually nil, and effectively ruled it out.

=== International involvement ===
B612 Foundation members assisted the Association of Space Explorers (ASE) in helping obtain United Nations (UN) oversight of near-Earth objects tracking and deflection missions through the United Nations Committee on the Peaceful Uses of Outer Space (UN COPUOS) along with COPUOS's Action Team 14 (AT-14) expert group. Several members of B612, also members of the ASE, worked with COPUOS since 2001 to establish international involvement for both impact disaster responses, and on deflection missions to prevent impact events. According to Foundation Chair Emeritus Rusty Schweickart in 2013, "No government in the world today has explicitly assigned the responsibility for planetary protection to any of its agencies".

In October 2013, COPUOS's Scientific and Technical Subcommittee approved several measures, later approved by the United Nations General Assembly in December, to deal with terrestrial asteroid impacts, including the creation of an International Asteroid Warning Network (IAWN) plus two advisory groups: the Space Missions Planning Advisory Group (SMPAG), and the Impact Disaster Planning Advisory Group (IDPAG). The IAWN warning network will act as a clearinghouse for shared information on dangerous asteroids and for any future terrestrial impact events that are identified. The Space Missions Planning Advisory Group will coordinate joint studies of the technologies for deflection missions, and as well provide oversight of actual missions. This is due to deflection missions typically involving a progressive movement of an asteroid's predicted impact point across the surface of the Earth (and also across the territories of uninvolved countries) until the near-Earth object is deflected either ahead of, or behind the planet at the point their orbits intersect. An initial framework of international cooperation at the United Nations is needed, said Schweickart, to guide the policymakers of its member nations on several important near-Earth object-related aspects. However, as asserted by the Foundation, the new UN measures only constitute a starting point. To be effective they will need to be enhanced by further policies and resources implemented at both the national and supernational levels.

At the time of the United Nations's policy adoption in New York City, Schweickart and four other ASE members, including B612 head Ed Lu and strategic advisers Dumitru Prunariu and Tom Jones participated in a public forum moderated by Neil deGrasse Tyson not far from the United Nations Headquarters. The panel urged the global community to adopt further important steps for planetary defense against near-Earth object impacts. Their recommendations included:

- UN delegates briefing their home countries' policymakers on the United Nations's newest roles;
- having each country's government create detailed asteroid disaster response plans, assigning fiscal resources to deal with asteroid impacts, and delegating a lead agency to handle its disaster response in order to create clear lines of communication from the IAWN to the affected countries;
- having their governments support the ASE's and B612's efforts to identify the estimated one million "city-killer" near-Earth objects capable of impacting Earth, by deploying a space-based asteroid telescope, and
- committing member states to launching an international test deflection mission within 10 years.

== Sentinel Mission ==
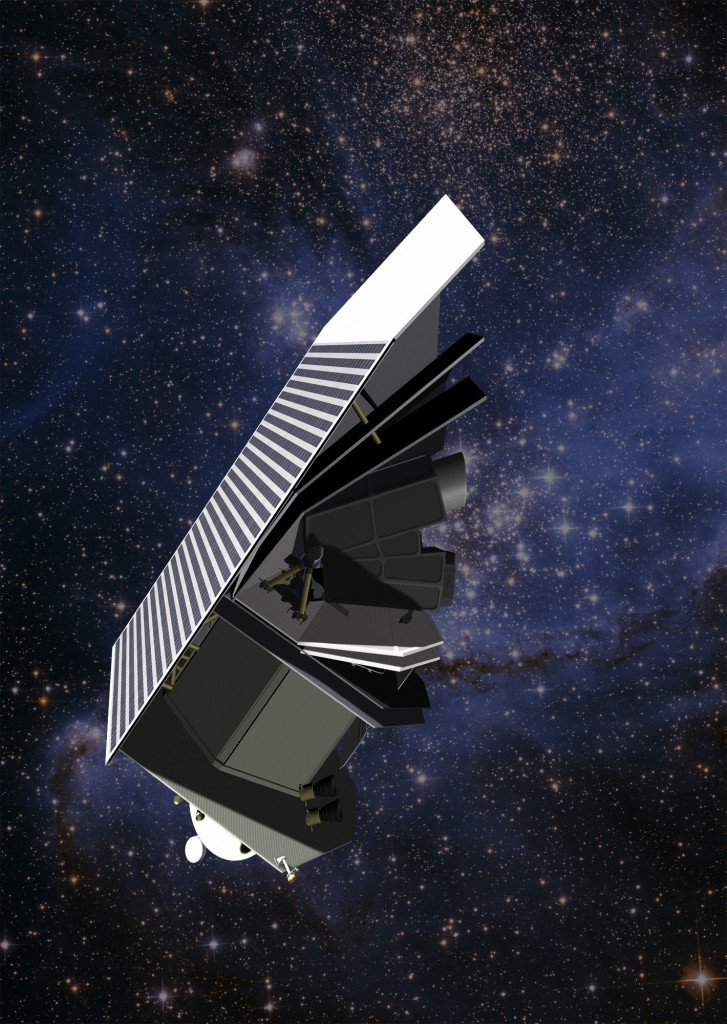
A depiction of the Sentinel Space Telescope, planned to be built by Ball Aerospace

The Sentinel Mission program was the cornerstone of the B612 Foundation's earlier efforts, with its preliminary design and system architecture level reviews planned for 2014, and its critical design review to be conducted in 2015. The infrared telescope would be launched atop a SpaceX Falcon 9 rocket, to be placed into a Venus-trailing heliocentric orbit around the Sun. Orbiting between the Sun and Earth, the Sun's rays would always be behind the telescope's lens and thus never inhibit the space observatory's ability to detect asteroids or other near-Earth objects (NEOs). From the vantage of its inner-solar system orbit around the Sun, Sentinel would be able to "pick up objects that are currently difficult, if not impossible, to see in advance from Earth", such as occurred with the Chelyabinsk meteor of 2013 that went undetected until its explosion over Chelyabinsk Oblast, Russia. The Sentinel Mission was planned to provide an accurate dynamic catalog of asteroids and other NEOs made available to scientists worldwide from the International Astronomical Union's Minor Planet Center, the data collected would calculate the risk of impact events with our planet, allowing for asteroid deflection by the use of gravity tractors to divert their trajectories away from Earth.

In order to communicate with the spacecraft while it is orbiting the Sun (at about the same distance as Venus), which can be at times as far as 270 million kilometres (170 million miles) from Earth, the B612 Foundation entered into a Space Act Agreement with NASA for the use of their deep space telecommunication network.

=== Design and operation ===
Sentinel was designed to perform continuous observation and analysis during its planned 6 1/2-year operational life, although B612 anticipates it may continue to function for up to 10 years. Using its 51-centimetre (20 in) telescope mirror with sensors built by Ball Aerospace (makers of the Hubble Space Telescope's instruments), its mission would be to catalog 90% of asteroids with diameters larger than 140 metres (460 ft). There were also plans to catalog smaller Solar System objects as well.

The space observatory would measure 7.7 metres (25 ft) by 3.2 metres (10 ft) with a mass of 1,500 kilograms (3,300 lb) and would orbit the Sun at a distance of 0.6 to 0.8 astronomical units (90,000,000 to 120,000,000 km; 56,000,000 to 74,000,000 mi) approximately the same orbital distance as Venus, employing infrared astronomy to identify asteroids against the cold of outer space. Sentinel would scan in the 7- to 15-micron wavelength band across a 5.5 by 2-degree field of view. Its sensor array would consist of 16 detectors with coverage scanning "a 200-degree, full-angle field of regard". B612, working in partnership with Ball Aerospace, was constructing Sentinel's 51 cm aluminum mirror, designed for a large field of view with its infrared sensors cooled to 40 K (−233.2 °C) using Ball's two-stage, closed-Stirling-cycle cryocooler.

B612 aimed to produce its space telescope at a significantly lower cost than traditional space science programs by making use of space hardware systems previously developed for earlier programs, rather than designing a brand new observatory. Schweickart stated that about "80% of what we're dealing with in Sentinel is Kepler, 15% Spitzer, 5% new, higher-performance infrared sensors", thus concentrating its R&D funds on the critical area of cryogenically-cooled image sensor technology, producing what it terms will be the most sensitive type of asteroid-finding telescope ever built.

Data gathered by Sentinel would be provided through existing scientific data-sharing networks that include NASA and academic institutions such as the Minor Planet Center in Cambridge, Massachusetts. Given the satellite's telescopic accuracy, Sentinel's data may have proven valuable for other possible future missions, such as asteroid mining.

=== Mission funding ===
B612 was attempting to raise approximately $450M to fund the development, launch and operational costs of the telescope, about the cost of a complex freeway interchange, or approximately $100M less than a single Air Force Next-Generation Bomber. The $450 million cost estimate is composed of $250 million to create Sentinel, plus another $200 million for 10 years of operations. In explaining the Foundation's bypassing of possible governmental grants for such a mission, Dr. Lu stated their public fundraising appeal is being driven by "[t]he tragedy of the commons: When it's everybody's problem, it's nobody's problem", referring to a lack of ownership, priority and funding that governments have assigned to asteroid threats, also stating on a different occasion "We're the only ones taking it seriously." According to another B612 board member, Rusty Schweickart, "The good news is, you can prevent it—not just get ready for it! The bad news is, it's hard to get anybody to pay attention to it when there are potholes in the road." After providing earlier Congressional testimony on the issue Schweickart was dismayed to hear from congressional staff members that, while U.S. lawmakers involved in the hearing understood the seriousness of the threat, they would likely not legislate funding for planetary defense as "making the deflection of asteroids a priority might backfire in [their] reelection campaigns".

The Foundation intended to launch Sentinel in 2017–2018, with initiation of data transfer for on-Earth processing anticipated no later than 6 months afterwards.

In the aftermath of the February 2013 Chelyabinsk meteor explosion—where an approximate 20 metres (66 ft) asteroid entered the atmosphere undetected at about Mach 60, becoming a brilliant superbolide meteor before exploding over Chelyabinsk, Russia—the B612 foundation experienced a "surge of interest" in its project to detect asteroids, with a corresponding increase in funding donations. After providing Congressional testimony Dr. Lu noted that the many online videos recorded of the asteroid's explosion over Chelyabinsk made a significant impact on millions of viewers worldwide, saying "There's nothing like a hundred YouTube videos to do that."

== Staff ==
=== Leadership ===
In 2014 eight key staff positions were designated, covering the offices of the chief executive officer (CEO), chief operating officer (COO), Sentinel Program Architecture (SPA), Sentinel Mission Direction (SMD), Sentinel Program Management (SPM), Sentinel Mission Science (SMS) and the Sentinel Standing Review Team (SSRT), plus Public Relations.

==== Ed Lu, Co-founder, B612 Foundation. Executive Director, Asteroid Institute ====
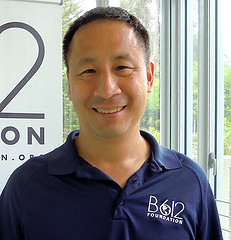
Ed Lu, co-founder and executive director, Asteroid Institute a B612 program

Edward Tsang "Ed" Lu (Chinese: 盧傑; pinyin: Lú Jié; born July 1, 1963) is a co-founder and the chief executive officer of the B612 Foundation, and as well, a U.S. physicist and a former NASA astronaut. He is a veteran of two Space Shuttle missions and an extended stay aboard the International Space Station which included a six-hour spacewalk outside the station performing construction work. During his three missions he logged a total of 206 days in space.

His education includes an electrical engineering degree from Cornell University, and a Ph.D. in applied physics from Stanford University. Lu became a specialist in solar physics and astrophysics as a visiting scientist at the High Altitude Observatory based in Boulder, Colorado, from 1989 until 1992. In his final year, he held a joint appointment with the Joint Institute for Laboratory Astrophysics at the University of Colorado. Lu performed postdoctoral fellow work at the Institute for Astronomy in Honolulu, Hawaii from 1992 until 1995 before being selected for NASA's Astronaut Corps in 1994.

Lu developed a number of new theoretical advances, which have provided for the first time a basic understanding of the underlying physics of solar flares. Besides his work on solar flares he has published journal articles and scientific papers on a wide range of topics including cosmology, solar oscillations, statistical mechanics, plasma physics, near-Earth asteroids, and is also a co-inventor of the gravitational tractor concept of asteroid deflection.

In 2007 Lu retired from NASA to become the Program Manager on Google's Advanced Projects Team, and also worked with Liquid Robotics as its Chief of Innovative Applications, and at Hover Inc. as its chief technology officer. While still at NASA during 2002 Lu co-founded the B612 Foundation, later serving as its Chair and in 2014 is currently its chief executive officer.

Lu holds a commercial pilot license with multi-engine instrument ratings, accumulating some 1,500 hours of flight time. Among his honors are NASA's highest awards, its Distinguished Service and Exceptional Service medals, as well as the Russian Gagarin, Komorov and Beregovoy Medals.

==== Tom Gavin, Chairman, Sentinel Standing Review Team ====
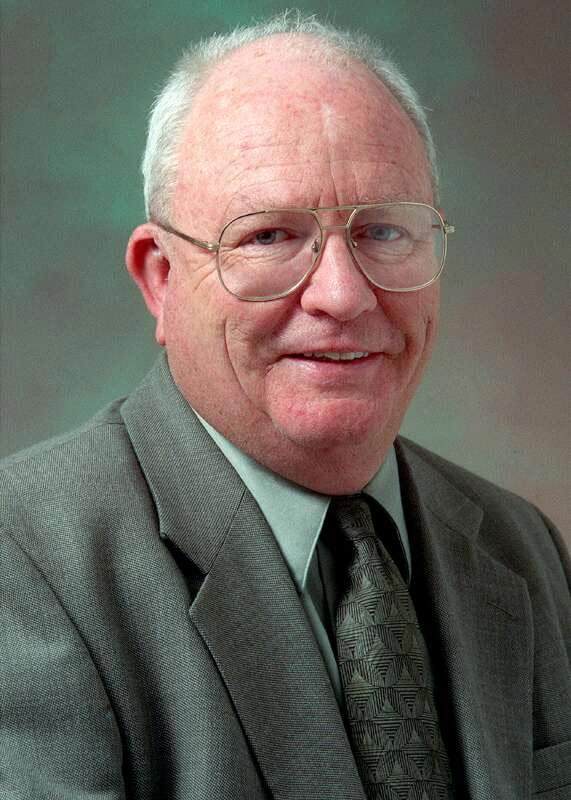
Tom Gavin, Chair, Sentinel Standing Review Team (SSRT)

Thomas R. Gavin is the chairman of the B612 Foundation's Sentinel Standing Review Team (SSRT), and a former executive-level manager at NASA. He served with NASA for 30 years, including his position as Associate Director for Flight Programs and Mission Assurance at their Jet Propulsion Laboratory (JPL) organization, and "has been at the forefront in leading many of the most successful U.S. space missions, including Galileo's mission to Jupiter, Cassini–Huygens mission to Saturn, development of Genesis, Stardust, Mars 2001 Odyssey, Mars Exploration Rovers, SPITZER and Galaxy Evolution Explorer programs."

In 2001 he was appointed associate director for flight projects and mission success for NASA's Jet Propulsion Laboratory in May 2001. This was a new position created to provide the JPL Director's Office with oversight of flight projects. He later served as interim director for Solar System exploration. Previously, he was director of JPL's Space Science Flight Projects Directorate, which oversaw the Genesis, Mars 2001 Odyssey, Mars rovers, Spitzer Space Telescope and GALEX projects. He also served as deputy director of JPL's Space and Earth Science Programs Directorate beginning in December 1997. In June 1990 he was appointed spacecraft system manager for the Cassini–Huygens mission to Saturn, and retained that position until the project's successful launch in 1997. From 1968 to 1990 he was a member of the Galileo and Voyager project offices responsible for mission assurance. He received his bachelor's degree in chemistry from Villanova University in Pennsylvania in 1961.

Gavin has been honored on a number of occasions for exceptional work, receiving NASA's Distinguished and Exceptional Service Medals in 1981 for his work on the Voyager space probes program, NASA's Medal for Outstanding Leadership in 1991 for Galileo, and again in 1999 for the Cassini-Hygens mission. In 1997 Aviation Week and Space Technology presented its Laurels Award to him for outstanding achievement in the field of space. He also earned the American Astronomical Society's 2005 Randolph Lovelace II Award for his management of all Jet Propulsion Laboratory and NASA robotic science spacecraft missions.

==== Scott Hubbard, Sentinel Program Architect ====
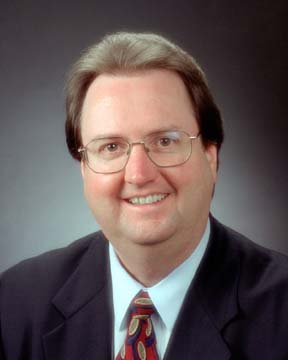
Dr. Scott Hubbard, Sentinel Program Architect

Dr. G. Scott Hubbard is the B612 Foundation's Sentinel Program Architect, as well as a physicist, academic and a former executive-level manager at NASA, the U.S. space agency. He is a professor of Aeronautics and Astronautics at Stanford University and has been engaged in space-related research as well as program, project and executive management for more than 35 years including 20 years with NASA, culminating his career there as director of NASA's Ames Research Center. At Ames he was responsible for overseeing the work of some 2,600 scientists, engineers and other staff. Currently on the SpaceX Safety Advisory Panel, he previously served as NASA's sole representative on the Space Shuttle Columbia Accident Investigation Board, and also as their first Mars Exploration Program director in 2000, successfully restructuring the entire Mars program in the wake of earlier serious mission failures.

Hubbard founded NASA's Astrobiology Institute in 1998; conceived the Mars Pathfinder mission with its airbag landing system and was the manager for their highly successful Lunar Prospector Mission. Prior to joining NASA, Hubbard led a small start-up high technology company in the San Francisco Bay Area and was a staff scientist at the Lawrence Berkeley National Laboratory. Hubbard has received many honors including NASA's highest award, their Distinguished Service Medal, and the American Institute of Aeronautics and Astronautics's Von Karman Medal.

Hubbard was elected to the International Academy of Astronautics, is a Fellow of the American Institute of Aeronautics and Astronautics, has authored more than 50 scientific papers on research and technology and also holds the Carl Sagan Chair at the SETI Institute. His education includes an undergraduate degree in physics and astronomy at Vanderbilt University and a graduate degree in solid state and semiconductor physics at the University of California at Berkeley.

==== Marc Buie, Sentinel Mission Scientist ====
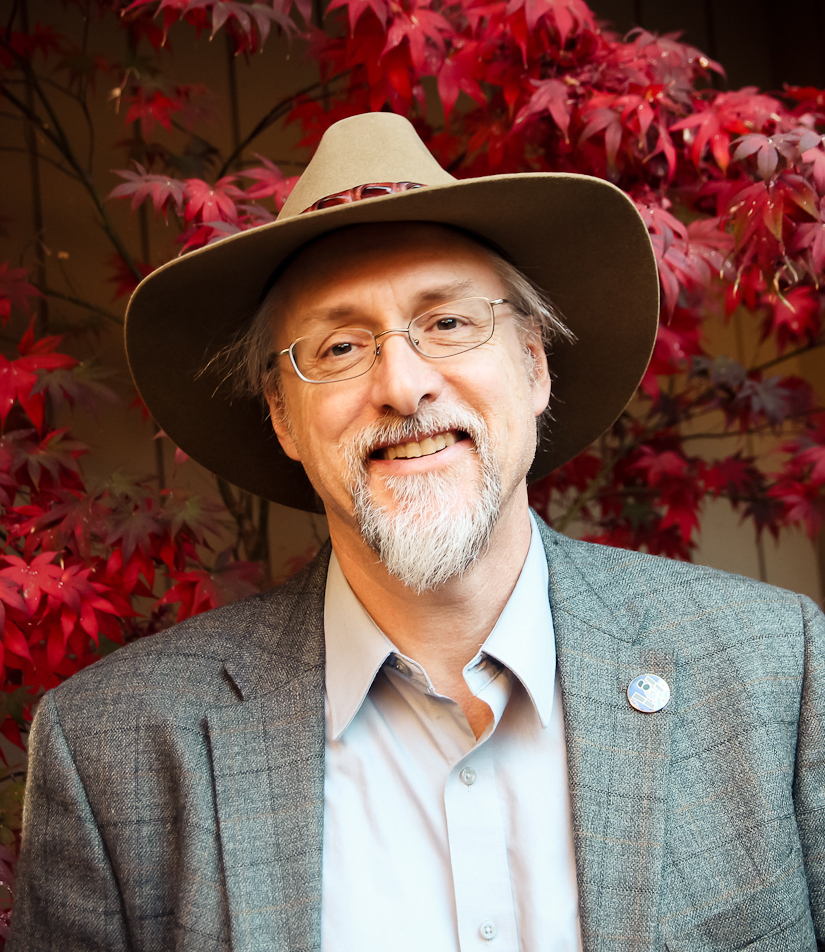
Dr. Marc Buie, Sentinel Mission Scientist

Dr. Marc W. Buie (b. 1958) is the foundation's Sentinel Mission Scientist, and as well a U.S. astronomer at Lowell Observatory in Flagstaff, Arizona. Buie received his B.Sc. in physics from Louisiana State University in 1980 and earned his Ph.D. in Planetary Science from the University of Arizona in 1984. He was a post-doctoral fellow at the University of Hawaiʻi from 1985 to 1988. From 1988 to 1991, he worked at the Space Telescope Science Institute where he assisted in the planning of the first planetary observations made by the Hubble Space Telescope.

Since 1983, Pluto and its moons have been a central theme of the research done by Buie, who has published over 85 scientific papers and journal articles. He is also one of the co-discoverers of Pluto's new moons, Nix and Hydra (Pluto II and Pluto III) discovered in 2005.

Buie has worked with the Deep Ecliptic Survey team who have been responsible for the discovery of over a thousand such distant objects. He also studies the Kuiper Belt and transitional objects such as 2060 Chiron and 5145 Pholus, as well as the occasional comets as with the recent Deep impact mission that travelled to Comet Tempel 1, and near-Earth asteroids with the occasional use of the Hubble and Spitzer Space Telescopes. Buie also assists in the development of advanced astronomical instrumentation.

Asteroid 7553 Buie is named in honor of the astronomer, who has also been profiled as part of an article on Pluto in Air & Space Smithsonian magazine.

==== Harold Reitsema, Sentinel Mission Director ====
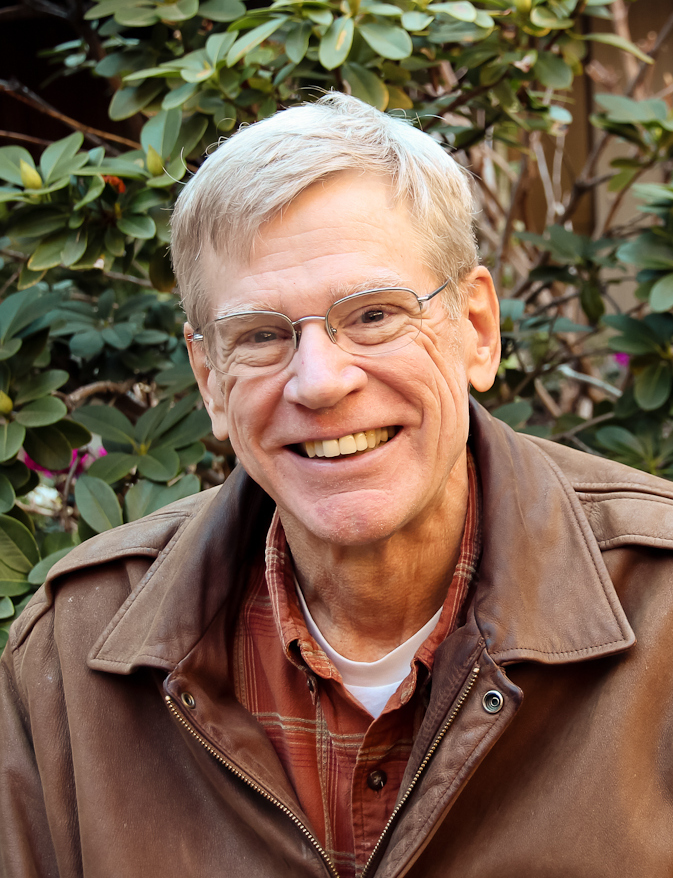
Dr. Harold Reitsema, Sentinel Mission Director

Dr. Harold James Reitsema (b. January 19, 1948, Kalamazoo, Michigan) is the foundation's Sentinel Mission Director and a U.S. astronomer. Reitsema was formerly Director of Science Mission Development at Ball Aerospace & Technologies, the B612 Foundation's prime contractor for designing and building its space telescope observatory. In his early career during the 1980s he was part of the teams that discovered new moons orbiting Neptune and Saturn through ground-based telescopic observations. Using a coronagraphic imaging system with one of the first charge-coupled devices available for astronomical use, they first observed Telesto in April 1980, just two months after being one of the first groups to observe Janus, also a moon of Saturn. Reitsema, as part of a different team of astronomers, observed Larissa in May 1981, by watching the occultation of a star by the Neptune system. Reitsema is also responsible for several advances in the use of false-color techniques applied to astronomical images.

Reitsema was a member of the Halley Multicolour Camera team on the European Space Agency Giotto spacecraft that took close-up images of Comet Halley in 1986. He has been involved in many of NASA's space science missions including the Spitzer Space Telescope, Submillimeter Wave Astronomy Satellite, the New Horizons mission to Pluto and the Kepler Space Observatory project searching for Earth-like planets orbiting distant stars similar to the Sun.

Reitsema participated in the ground-based observations of Deep Impact mission in 2005, observing the impact of the spacecraft on the Tempel 1 comet using the telescopes of the Sierra de San Pedro Mártir Observatory in Mexico, along with colleagues from the University of Maryland and the Mexican National Astronomical Observatory.

Reitsema retired from Ball Aerospace in 2008 and remains a consultant to NASA and the aerospace industry in mission design and Near-Earth Objects. His education includes his B.A. in physics from Calvin College in Grand Rapids, Michigan in 1972 and a Ph.D. in astronomy from New Mexico State University in 1977. Main-belt Asteroid 13327 Reitsema is named after him to honor his achievements.

==== John Troeltzsch, Sentinel Program Manager ====
John Troeltzsch is the B612 Foundation's Sentinel Program Manager, a senior U.S. aerospace engineer and as well a program manager with Ball Aerospace & Technologies. Ball Aerospace is the Sentinel's prime contractor responsible for its design and integration, to be later launched aboard a SpaceX Falcon 9 rocket into a Venus-trailing heliocentric orbit around the Sun. Troeltzsch's responsibilities include overseeing all requirements for the observatory's detailed design and build at Ball. As part of his 31 years of service with them, he helped create three of the Hubble Space Telescope's instruments and also managed the Spitzer Space Telescope program until its launch in 2003. Troeltzsch later became the Kepler Mission program manager at Ball in 2007.

Troeltzsch's program management abilities include experience with spacecraft systems engineering and software integration through all phases of space telescope projects, from contract definition through assembly, launch and on-station operational start up. His past project experience includes the Kepler Mission, Hubble's Goddard High Resolution Spectrograph (GHRS) and its COSTAR Space Telescope corrective optics, as well as the cryogenically-cooled instruments on the Spitzer Space Telescope.

Troeltzsch was awarded the NASA Exceptional Public Service Medal for his commitment to the success of the Kepler mission. His education includes a B.Sc. and an M.Sc. in Aerospace Engineering, both from the University of Colorado in 1983 and 1989 respectively, the latter while employed at Ball Aerospace which hired him immediately after the completion of his undergraduate degree.

==== David Liddle, Chair, Board of Directors ====
Dr. David Liddle is the foundation's Board Chair and a former technology industry executive and professor of computer science. He also holds the Chair of many boards of directors, including research institutes, in the United States.

Liddle is a partner at the venture capital firm U.S. Venture Partners, and is a co-founder and former CEO of both the Interval Research Corporation and Metaphor Computer Systems, plus a consulting professor of computer science at Stanford University, credited with heading development of the Xerox Star computer system. He served as an executive at the Xerox Corporation and IBM and currently serves on the board of directors of Inphi Corporation, The New York Times and the B612 Foundation. In January 2012, he also joined the board of directors of SRI International.

Liddle also held the chair of the board of trustees for the Santa Fe Institute, a nonprofit theoretical research center, from 1994 to 1999, and served on the U.S.'s DARPA Information, Science and Technology Committee. Additionally, he was Chair of the Computer Science and Telecommunications Board of the U.S. National Research Council due to his work on human-computer interface designs. In a field unrelated to the sciences and technology, Liddle is a Senior Fellow of the Royal College of Art in London, England.

His education includes a B.Sc. in electrical engineering from the University of Michigan and a Ph.D. in Electrical Engineering and Computer Science from the University of Toledo.

=== Board of directors ===
As of 2014 the B612 Foundation's board includes Geoffrey Baehr (formerly with Sun Microsystems and U.S. Venture Partners), plus Doctors Chapman, Piet Hut, Ed Lu (also CEO, see Leadership, above), David Liddle (Chair, see Leadership, above), and Dan Durda, a planetary scientist.

==== Rusty Schweickart, co-founder and chair emeritus ====
Russell Louis "Rusty" Schweickart (b. October 25, 1935) is a co-founder of the B612 Foundation and chair emeritus of its board of directors. He is also a former U.S. Apollo astronaut, research scientist, Air Force pilot, plus business and government executive. Schweickart, chosen in NASA's third astronaut group, is best known as the lunar module pilot on the Apollo 9 mission, the spacecraft's first crewed flight test on which he performed the first in-space test of the portable life support system used by the Apollo astronauts who walked on the Moon. Prior to joining NASA, Schweickart was a scientist at the Massachusetts Institute of Technology's Experimental Astronomy Laboratory, where he researched upper atmospheric physics and became an expert in star tracking and the stabilization of stellar images, a crucial requirement for space navigation. Schweickart's education includes a B.Sc. in aeronautical engineering and an M.Sc. in Aeronautics–Astronautics, both from the Massachusetts Institute of Technology (MIT), in 1956 and 1963 respectively. His Master's thesis was on the validation of "theoretical models of stratospheric radiance".

After serving as the backup commander of NASA's first crewed Skylab mission (the United States' first space station), he later became director of User Affairs in their Office of Applications. Schweickart left NASA in 1977 to serve for two years as California governor Jerry Brown's assistant for science and technology, and was then appointed by Brown to California's Energy Commission for five and a half years.

Schweickart co-founded the Association of Space Explorers (ASE) with other astronauts in 1984–85 and chaired the ASE's NEO Committee, producing a benchmark report, Asteroid Threats: A Call for Global Response, and submitting it to the United Nations Committee on the Peaceful Uses of Outer Space (UN COPUOS). He then co-chaired, along with astronaut Dr. Tom Jones, NASA's Advisory Council's Task Force on Planetary Defense. In 2002 he co-founded B612, also serving as its chair.

Schweickart is a Fellow of the American Astronautical Society, the International Academy of Astronautics and the California Academy of Sciences, as well as an associate fellow of the American Institute of Aeronautics and Astronautics. Among the honors he has received are the Federation Aeronautique Internationale's De la Vaulx Medal in 1970 for his Apollo 9 flight, both of NASA's Distinguished Service and Exceptional Service medals, and, unusual for an astronaut, an Emmy Award from the U.S. National Academy of Television Arts and Sciences for transmitting the first live TV pictures from space.

==== Clark Chapman, co-founder and board member ====
Clark Chapman is a B612 board member and "a planetary scientist whose research has specialized in studies of asteroids and cratering of planetary surfaces, using telescopes, spacecraft, and computers. He is a past chair of the Division for Planetary Sciences (DPS) of the American Astronomical Society and was the first editor of the Journal of Geophysical Research: Planets. He is a winner of the Carl Sagan Award for Public Understanding of Science and has worked on the science teams of the MESSENGER, Galileo and Near-Earth Asteroid Rendezvous space missions."

Chapman has a degree from Harvard University and has earned two degrees from the Massachusetts Institute of Technology, including his Ph.D., in the fields of astronomy, meteorology and the planetary sciences, and also served at the Planetary Science Institute in Tucson, Arizona. He is currently on faculty at the Southwest Research Institute of Boulder, Colorado.

==== Dan Durda, board member ====
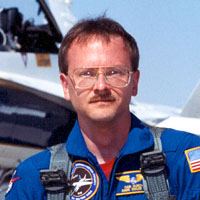
Dr. Dan Durda, B612 board member, prior to a NASA Dryden F-18 astronomy mission

Dr. Daniel David "Dan" Durda (b. October 26, 1965, Detroit, Michigan), is a B612 board member and "a principal scientist in the Department of Space Studies of the Southwest Research Institute's (SwRI) Boulder Colorado. He has more than 20 years experience researching the collisional and dynamical evolution of main-belt and near-Earth asteroids, Vulcanoids, Kuiper belt comets, and interplanetary dust." He is the author of 68 journal and scientific articles and has presented his reports and findings at 22 professional symposiums. He has also taught as adjunct professor in the Department of Sciences at Front Range Community College.

Durda is an active instrument-rated pilot who has flown numerous aircraft, including high performance F/A-18 Hornets and the F-104 Starfighters, and "was a 2004 NASA astronaut selection finalist. Dan is one of three SwRI payload specialists who will fly on multiple suborbital spaceflights on Virgin Galactic's Enterprise and XCOR Aerospace's Lynx."

His education includes a B.Sc. in astronomy from the University of Michigan, plus an M.Sc. and a Ph.D., both in astronomy at the University of Florida, in 1987, 1989 and 1993 respectively. Besides winning the University of Florida's Kerrick Prize "for outstanding contributions in astronomy", Asteroid 6141 Durda is named in his honour.

=== Strategic advisers ===
As of July 2014, the Foundation has taken on over twenty key advisers drawn from the sciences, the space industry and other professional fields. Their goals are to provide both advice and critiques, and assist in several other facets of the Sentinel Mission. Included among them are: Dr. Alexander Galitsky, a former Soviet computer scientist and B612 Founding Circle adviser; British Astronomer Royal, cosmologist and astrophysicist Lord Martin Rees, the Baron Rees of Ludlow; U.S. Star Trek director Alexander Singer; U.S. science journalist and writer Andrew Chaikin; British astrophysicist and songwriter Dr. Brian May; U.S. astronomer Carolyn Shoemaker; U.S. astrophysicist Dr. David Brin; Romanian cosmonaut Dumitru Prunariu; U.S. physicist and mathematician Dr. Freeman Dyson; U.S. astrophysicist and former Harvard-Smithsonian Center for Astrophysics head Dr. Irwin Shapiro; U.S. film director Jerry Zucker; British-U.S. balloonist Julian Nott; Dutch astrophysicist and B612 co-founder Dr. Piet Hut; former U.S. ambassador Philip Lader; British cosmologist and astrophysicist Dr. Roger Blandford; U.S. writer and Whole Earth Catalog founder Stewart Brand; U.S. media head Tim O'Reilly; and former U.S. NASA astronaut Dr. Tom Jones.

==== Tom Jones, strategic adviser ====
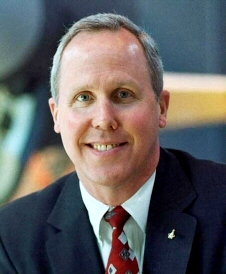
Dr. Tom Jones, strategic adviser

Dr. Thomas David "Tom" Jones (b. January 22, 1955) is a strategic adviser to B612, member of the NASA Advisory Council and a former U.S. astronaut and planetary scientist who has studied asteroids for NASA, engineered intelligence-gathering systems for the CIA, and helped develop advanced mission concepts to explore the Solar System. In his 11 years with NASA he flew on four Space Shuttle missions, logging a total of 53 days in space. His flight time included three spacewalks to install the centerpiece science module of the International Space Station (ISS). His publications include Planetology: Unlocking the Secrets of the Solar System.

After graduating from the United States Air Force Academy where he received his B.Sc. in 1977, Jones earned a Ph.D. in Planetary Sciences from the University of Arizona in 1988. His research interests included the remote sensing of asteroids, meteorite spectroscopy, and applications of space resources. In 1990 he joined Science Applications International Corporation in Washington, D.C. as a senior scientist. Dr. Jones performed advanced program planning for NASA's Goddard Space Flight Center's Solar System Exploration Division. His work there included the investigation of future robotic missions to Mars, asteroids, and the outer Solar System.

After a year of training following his selection by NASA he became an astronaut in July 1991. In 1994 he flew as mission specialists on successive flights of various Space Shuttles, running science operations on the "night shift" during STS-59, successfully deploying and retrieving two science satellites. While helping set a shuttle mission endurance record of nearly 18 days in orbit, Jones used Columbia's robotic Canadarm to release the Wake Shield satellite and later grapple it from orbit. His last space flight was in February 2001, helping to deliver the U.S. Destiny Laboratory Module to the ISS where he helped install the laboratory module in a series of three space walks lasting over 19 hours. That installation marked the start of onboard scientific research on the ISS.

Among his honors are NASA's medals and awards for Space Flight, Exceptional Service and Outstanding Leadership, plus the Federation Aeronautique Internationale's (FAI) Komarov Diploma and a NASA Graduate Student Research Fellowship.

==== Piet Hut, co-founder and strategic adviser ====
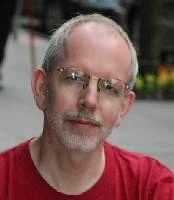
Dr. Piet Hut, B612 Foundation co-founder and strategic adviser

Dr. Piet Hut (b. September 26, 1952, Utrecht, The Netherlands) is a co-founder of the B612 Foundation, one of its strategic advisers, and a Dutch astrophysicist, who divides his time between research in computer simulations of dense stellar systems and broadly interdisciplinary collaborations, ranging from fields in natural science to computer science, cognitive psychology and philosophy. He is currently Program Head in Interdisciplinary Studies at the Institute for Advanced Study in Princeton, New Jersey, former home to Albert Einstein.

Hut's specialization is in "stellar and planetary dynamics; many of his more than two hundred articles are written in collaboration with colleagues from different fields, ranging from particle physics, geophysics and paleontology to computer science, cognitive psychology and philosophy." Dr. Hut was an early adviser to Lu and served as a founding member of the B612 Foundation's board of directors.

Hut has held positions in a number of faculties, including the Institute for Theoretical Physics, Utrecht University (1977–1978); the Astronomical Institute at the University of Amsterdam (1978–1981); Astronomy Department of the University of California, Berkeley (1984–1985) and in the Institute for Advanced Study, in Princeton, New Jersey (1981–present). He has held honors, functions, fellowships and memberships in almost 150 different professional organizations, universities and conferences, and published over 225 papers and articles in scientific journals and symposiums, including his first in 1976 on "The Two-Body problem with a Decreasing Gravitational Constant". In 2014 he became a strategic adviser to the B612 Foundation.

His education includes an M.Sc. from the University of Utrecht and a double Ph.D. in particle physics and astrophysics from the University of Amsterdam in 1977 and 1981 respectively. He is the namesource for Asteroid 17031 Piethut honoring his work in planetary dynamics and for his co-founding of B612.

==== Dumitru Prunariu, strategic adviser ====
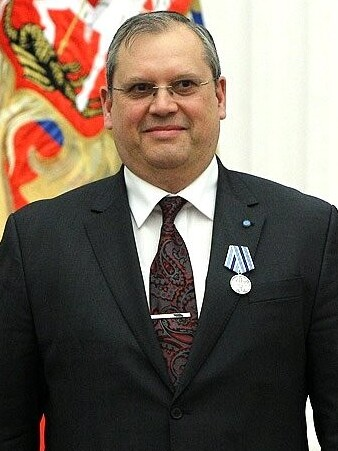
Dr. Dumitru Prunariu, strategic advisor and former chairman of the United Nations Committee on the Peaceful Uses of Outer Space (UN COPUOS)

Dr. Dumitru-Dorin Prunariu (Romanian pronunciation: [duˈmitru doˈrin pruˈnarju], born September 27, 1952) is a retired Romanian cosmonaut and a strategic advisor to the B612 Foundation. In 1981 he flew an eight-day mission to the Soviet Salyut 6 space station where he and his crewmates completed experiments in astrophysics, space radiation, space technology, and space medicine. He received the Hero of the Socialist Republic of Romania, the Hero of the Soviet Union, the "Hermann Oberth Gold Medal", the "Golden Star Medal" and the Order of Lenin.

Prunariu is a member of the International Academy of Astronautics, the Romanian National COSPAR Committee, and the Association of Space Explorers (ASE). In 1993, until 2004, he was the permanent representative of the ASE at the United Nations Committee on the Peaceful Uses of Outer Space (UN COPUOS) and has represented Romania at COPUOS sessions since 1992. He also became the vice-president of the International Institute for Risk, Security and Communication Management (EURISC), and from 1998 to 2004 the president of the Romanian Space Agency. In 2000 he was appointed Associate Professor on Geopolitics within the Faculty of International Business and Economics, Academy of Economic Studies in Bucharest and in 2004 he was elected COPUOS's Chairman of the Scientific and Technical Subcommittee. He was then elected as COPUOS's top level chairman, serving from 2010 to 2012, and also elected as the president of the ASE with a three-year mandate.

Prunariu has co-authored several books on space flight and both presented and published numerous scientific papers. His education includes a degree in aerospace engineering in 1976 from the Politehnica University of Bucharest. His Ph.D. thesis led to improvements in the field of space flight dynamics.

== Deflection methods ==
A number of methods have been devised to 'deflect' an asteroid or other near-Earth objects (NEO) away from an Earth-impacting trajectory, so that it can entirely avoid entering the Earth's atmosphere. Given sufficient advance lead time, a change to the body's velocity of as little as one centimetre per second will allow it to avoid hitting the Earth. Proposed and experimental deflection methods include ion beam shepherds, focused solar energy and the use of mass drivers or solar sails.

Initiating a nuclear explosive device above, on, or slightly beneath, the surface of a threatening NEO is a potential deflection option, with the optimal detonation height dependent upon the NEO's composition and size. In the case of a threatening "rubble pile", the stand off, or detonation height above the surface configuration has been put forth as a means to prevent the potential fracturing of the rubble pile. However, given sufficient advance warning of an asteroid's impact, most scientists avoid endorsing explosive deflection due to the number of potential issues involved. Other methods that can accomplish NEO deflections include:

=== Gravity tractor ===
An alternative to an explosive deflection is to move a dangerous asteroid slowly and consistently over time. The effect of a tiny constant thrust can accumulate to deviate an object sufficiently from its predicted course. In 2005 Drs. Ed Lu and Stanley G. Love proposed using a large, heavy uncrewed spacecraft hovering over an asteroid to gravitationally pull the latter into a non-threatening orbit. The method will function due to the spacecraft's and asteroid's mutually gravitational attraction. When the spacecraft counters the gravitational attraction towards the asteroid by the use of, for example, an ion thruster engine, the net effect is that the asteroid is accelerated, or moved, towards the spacecraft and thus slowly deflected from the orbital path that will lead it to a collision with Earth.

While slow, this method has the advantage of working irrespective of an asteroid's composition. It would even be effective on a comet, loose rubble pile, or an object spinning at a high rate. However, a gravity tractor would likely have to spend several years stationed beside and tugging on the body to be effective. The Sentinel Space Telescope's mission is designed to provide the required advance lead time.

According to Rusty Schweickart, the gravitational tractor method also has a controversial aspect because during the process of changing an asteroid's trajectory, the point on Earth where it would most likely hit would slowly be shifted temporarily across the face of the planet. It means the threat for the entire planet might be minimized at a temporary cost of some specific states' security. Schweickart recognizes that choosing the manner and direction the asteroid should be "dragged" may be a difficult international decision, and one that should be made through the United Nations.

An early NASA analysis of deflection alternatives in 2007, stated: "'Slow push' mitigation techniques are the most expensive, have the lowest level of technical readiness, and their ability to both travel to and divert a threatening near-Earth object would be limited unless mission durations of many years to decades are possible." But a year later in 2008 the B612 Foundation released a technical evaluation of the gravity tractor concept, produced on contract to NASA. Their report confirmed that a transponder-equipped tractor "with a simple and robust spacecraft design" can provide the needed towing service for a 140-meters-diameter equivalent, Hayabusa-shaped asteroid or other near-Earth object.

=== Kinetic impact ===
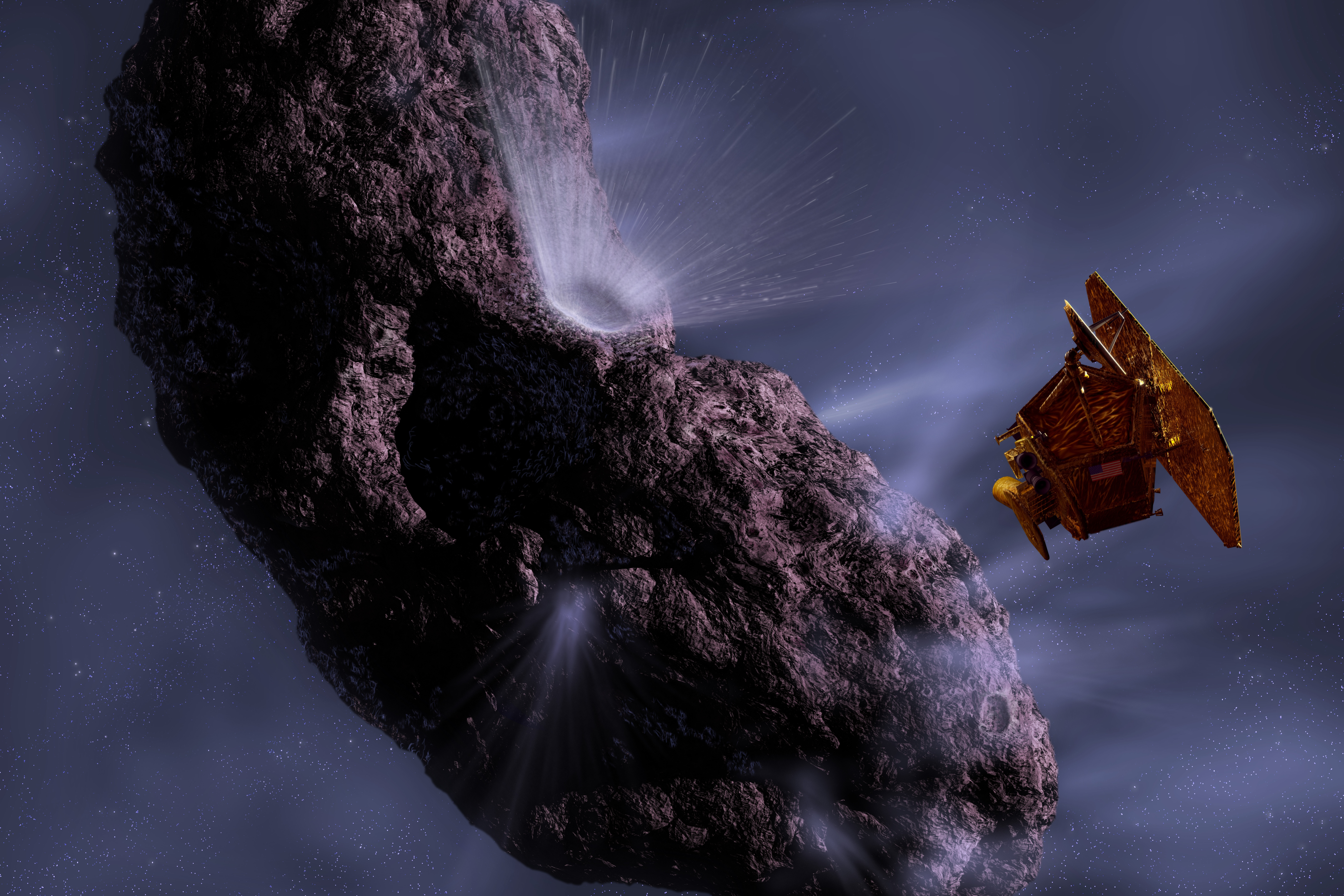
An artist's rendering of NASA's Deep Impact spacecraft next to Comet Tempel 1

Deep Impact being crashed into Comet Tempel 1 in July 2005 (photographed from a companion spacecraft), an example of a technique that can alter a near-Earth object's trajectory.

When the asteroid is still far from Earth, a means of deflecting the asteroid is to directly alter its momentum by colliding a spacecraft with the asteroid. The further away from the Earth, the smaller the required impact force becomes. Conversely, the closer a dangerous near-Earth object (NEO) is to Earth at the time of its discovery, the greater the force that is required to make it deviate from its collision trajectory with the Earth. Closer to Earth, the impact of a massive spacecraft is a possible solution to a pending NEO impact.

In 2005, in the wake of the successful U.S. mission that crashed its Deep Impact probe into Comet Tempel 1, China announced its plan for a more advanced version: the landing of a spacecraft probe on a small NEO in order to push it off course. In the 2000s the European Space Agency (ESA) began studying the design of a space mission named Don Quijote, which, if flown, would have been the first intentional asteroid deflection mission ever designed. ESA's Advanced Concepts Team also demonstrated theoretically that a deflection of 99942 Apophis could be achieved by sending a spacecraft weighing less than a tonne to impact against the asteroid.

ESA had originally identified two NEOs as possible targets for its Quijote mission: 2002 AT4 and (10302) 1989 ML. Neither asteroid represents a threat to Earth. In a subsequent study, two different possibilities were selected: the Amor asteroid 2003 SM84 and 99942 Apophis; the latter is of particular significance to Earth as it will make a close approach in 2029 and 2036. In 2005, ESA announced at the 44th annual Lunar and Planetary Science Conference that its mission would be combined into a joint ESA-NASA Asteroid Impact & Deflection Assessment (AIDA) mission, proposed for 2019–2022. The target selected for AIDA will be a binary asteroid, so that the deflection effect could also be observed from Earth by timing the rotation period of the binary pair. AIDA's new target, a component of binary asteroid 65803 Didymos, will be impacted at a velocity of 22,530 km/h (14,000 mph)

A NASA analysis of deflection alternatives, conducted in 2007, stated: "Non-nuclear kinetic impactors are the most mature approach and could be used in some deflection/mitigation scenarios, especially for NEOs that consist of a single small, solid body."

== Funding status ==
The B612 Foundation is a California 501(c)(3) non-profit, private foundation. Financial contributions to the B612 Foundation are tax-exempt in the United States. Its principal offices are in Mill Valley, California; they were previously located in Tiburon, California.

Fund raising has not gone well for B612 as of June 2015. With an overall goal to raise US$450 million for the project, the foundation raised only approximately US$1.2 million in 2012 and US$1.6 million in 2013.

== Foundation name ==
The B612 Foundation is named in tribute to the eponymous home asteroid of the hero of Antoine de Saint-Exupéry's best-selling philosophical fable of Le Petit Prince (The Little Prince). In aviation's early pioneer years of the 1920s, Saint-Exupéry made an emergency landing on top of an African mesa covered with crushed white limestone seashells. Walking around in the moonlight he kicked a black rock and soon deduced it was a meteorite that had fallen from space.

That experience later contributed, in 1943, to his literary creation of Asteroid B-612 in his philosophical fable of a little prince fallen to Earth, with the home planetoid's name having been adapted from one of the mail planes Saint-Exupéry once flew, bearing the registration marking A-612.

Also inspired by the story is an asteroid discovered in 1993, though not identified as posing any threat to Earth, named 46610 Bésixdouze (the numerical part of its designation represented in hexadecimal as 'B612', while the textual part is French for "B six twelve"). As well, a small asteroid moon, Petit-Prince, discovered in 1998 is named in part after The Little Prince.

== See also ==
- Qingyang event
- 99942 Apophis
- Asteroid impact prediction
- Asteroid impact avoidance
- Asteroid Day
- Asteroid Terrestrial-impact Last Alert System (ATLAS)
- Deep Space Industries
- Gravity tractor
- List of impact craters on Earth
- List of meteor air bursts
- NEOShield
- Near Earth Object Surveillance Satellite (NEOS Sat)
- Planetary Resources
- Potentially hazardous object
- Spaceguard
- Spaceguard Foundation
- Tunguska event
- United Nations Committee on the Peaceful Uses of Outer Space (UN COPUOS)
