= Steven Tainer =

Student of Buddhism and Taoism (born 1947)

Steven Arthur Tainer (born 26 July 1947) is an instructor of Asian contemplative traditions.

== Spiritual education ==
Tainer began his study of Tibetan Buddhism in 1970. His primary teachers included Tarthang Tulku Rinpoche and Chogyal Namkhai Norbu Rinpoche.

Upon the publication of Time, Space, and Knowledge in 1977, which he ghostwrote for his first instructor, Tarthang Tulku Rinpoche, he earned an advanced degree in Tibetan Buddhist studies. He was eventually named a Dharma heir of Tarthang Tulku, however, he did not take up the position. After collaborating with Ming Liu (born Charles Belyea) in the 1980s, Tainer was declared a successor in a family lineage of yogic Taoism. In 1991, he co-authored a book with Ming Liu (Charles Belyea), titled Dragon's Play and together founded Da Yuen Circle of Yogic Taoism.

Starting in the mid-1980s, he studied Confucian views of contemplation emphasizing exemplary conduct in ordinary life.

== Career ==
He first taught under the direction of his masters in the early 1970s. Tainer began teaching his groups in 1990.

Since 1995, Tainer has been a faculty member of the Institute for World Religions and the Berkeley Buddhist Monastery.

Tainer is one of the founders of the Kira Institute. Between 1998 and 2002, Piet Hut and Tainer organized a series of annual summer schools.

In 2024, Yuko Ishihara and Tainer published Intercultural Phenomenology: Playing with Reality, which explores using play within "suspension of judgement", with roots in Western phenomenological and Eastern Buddhist, Taoist, and Confucian disciplines, for first-person direct examination of experience.

== See also ==
- Cognitive psychology
- Reality in Buddhism
