= Kira Institute =

Non-profit scientific organisation

- Formation: 1997
- Type: Research institute
- Key people: Piet Hut
- Website: www.kira.org

The Kira Institute is a non-profit organization. It was founded in 1997 to encourage open inquiry concerning the nature of scientific knowledge and its relation to other perspectives drawn from a wide variety of fields.

The founders were Piet Hut (astrophysicist at the Institute for Advanced Study in Princeton), Roger Shepard (then cognitive psychologist at Stanford University), Steven Tainer (instructor at the Institute for World Religions), Bas van Fraassen (then philosopher of science at Princeton University), and Arthur Zajonc (physicist at Amherst College).

== Education ==
The Kira Institute conducted a series of yearly summer schools at Amherst College, from 1998 to 2002, aimed at bringing together graduate students from various disciplines within science, as well as the history and philosophy of science. Guest speakers were chosen from fields like biology, cognitive science, computer science, art history, philosophy, and sociology of science and included Geshe Thupten Jinpa, Erazim Kohák, Elisabeth Lloyd, Brian Cantwell Smith, Elizabeth Spelke, Lynn Margulis, and David Abram.

== Research ==
In addition, from 1997 to 2005 the founders met several times a year for three-day weekends. These meetings served to guide the group's main research, publications and educational activities.

== Second Life ==
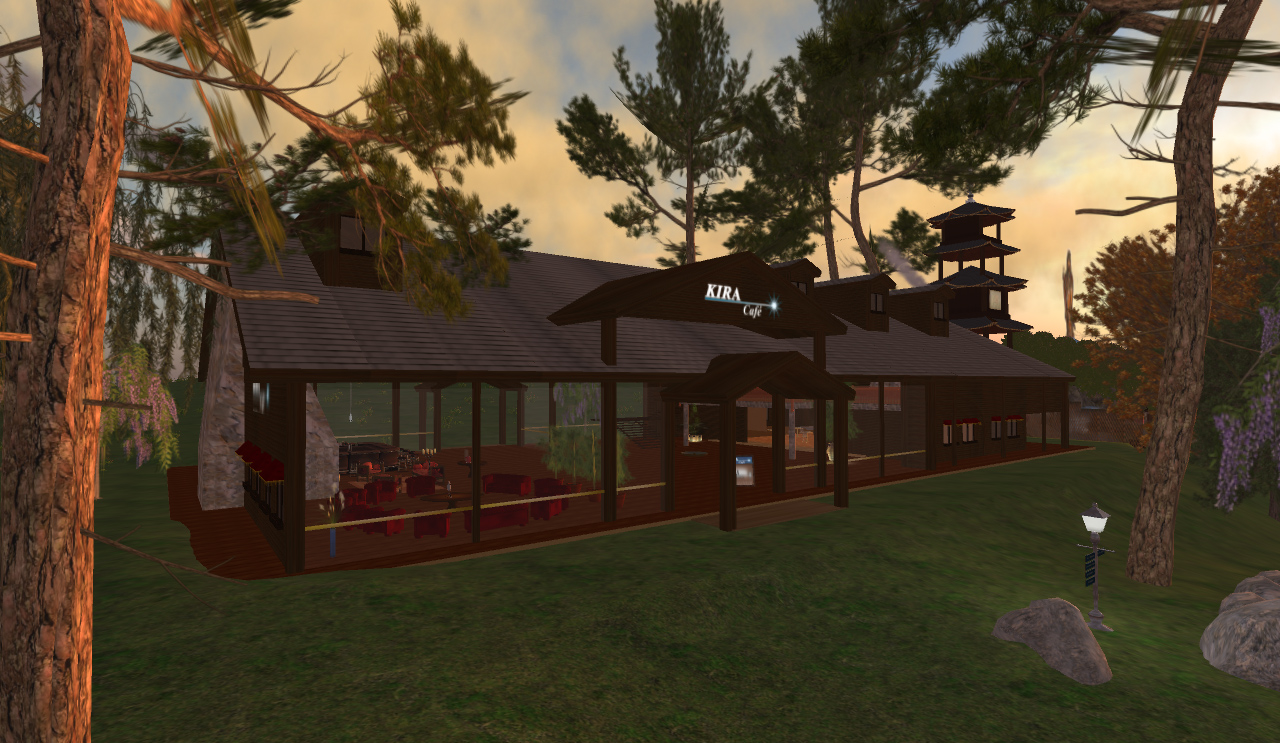
The Kira Café at sunset in Second Life

In 2008, Kira Institute created a Kira Café in the virtual world of Second Life, which hosted workshops on topics such as "laboratories in the metaverse", art history, law, phenomenology, and interdisciplinary studies. The Kira Café had an operating philosophy comparable to Café Scientifique. The building stood until April 2015, when the Café closed.
