= Clark Chapman =

American astronomer (born 1945)

- Born: May 13, 1945
- Education: Harvard, MIT
- Known for: Near Earth Objects
- Awards: Carl Sagan Medal
- Scientific career
- Fields: planetary science
- Workplaces: Planetary Science Institute, Southwest Research Institute
- Thesis: Surface properties of asteroids (1972)

Clark R. Chapman (born May 13, 1945) is a senior scientist and astronomer at the Southwest Research Institute's Boulder, Colorado, Department of Space Studies. His research generally focuses on astronomy including meteorology and comets. He earned an undergraduate degree in astronomy from Harvard, Master's Degree in Meteorology from M.I.T., and PhD in Planetary Science from M.I.T. (1972).

He is best known for his work on potentially hazardous asteroids and was among the first scientists to bring attention to asteroids and comets that are potentially hazardous to Earth.

He is co-founder and on the Board of Directors of B612 Foundation.

Chapman has served extensively on the IAU's commission for the study of comets and minor planets, serving as member, vice president and president. He currently is a member of the division focused on planetary systems and astrobiology. Chapman also worked on the science teams of the MESSENGER mission to Mercury, Galileo and Near-Earth Asteroid Rendezvous mission.

In addition to 3 books on the inner planets, Chapman often contributes to Sky and Telescope, Astronomy Magazine, The New Scientist and The Planetary Report as well as articles on planetary subjects in The New Encyclopedia Britannica and The Encyclopedia of Science and Technology. He also was the first editor of the Journal of Geophysical Research: Planets.

== Awards ==
- 1999 Carl Sagan Medal for Excellence in Public Communication in Planetary Science
- 2000 Fellow of the American Association for the Advancement of Science
