= 6141 Durda =

Mars-crossing asteroid

Discovery
- Discovered by: Spacewatch
- Discovery site: Kitt Peak National Obs.
- Discovery date: 26 December 1992

Designations
- Named after: Daniel D. Durda (astronomer, artist)
- Alternative designations: 1992 YC_{3} · 1983 AZ_{2} 1988 AJ · 1989 PL
- Minor planet category: Mars-crosser · Hungaria

Orbital characteristics
- Epoch 4 September 2017 (JD 2458000.5)
- Uncertainty parameter 0
- Observation arc: 34.05 yr (12,435 days)
- Aphelion: 2.0780 AU
- Perihelion: 1.5580 AU
- Semi-major axis: 1.8180 AU
- Eccentricity: 0.1430
- Orbital period (sidereal): 2.45 yr (895 days)
- Mean anomaly: 55.898°
- Mean motion: 0° 24^{m} 7.56^{s} / day
- Inclination: 16.454°
- Longitude of ascending node: 284.81°
- Argument of perihelion: 145.73°

Physical characteristics
- Dimensions: 3.20 km (calculated); 4 km (est. at 0.25)
- Synodic rotation period: 460±5 h
- Geometric albedo: 0.30 (assumed)
- Spectral type: E
- Absolute magnitude (H): 14.4

6141 Durda, provisional designation 1992 YC3 is a stony Hungaria asteroid, classified as slow rotator and Mars-crosser from the innermost region of the asteroid belt, approximately 3.2 kilometers in diameter. It was discovered on 26 December 1992, by Spacewatch at Kitt Peak National Observatory in Arizona, United States.

== Classification and orbit ==
This Mars-crosser and presumed E-type asteroid is also member of the Hungaria family, which form the innermost dense concentration of asteroids in the Solar System. It orbits the Sun in the inner main-belt at a distance of 1.6–2.1 AU once every 2 years and 5 months (895 days). Its orbit has an eccentricity of 0.14 and an inclination of 16° with respect to the ecliptic. On 22 September 2154, it will pass 0.0088 AU (1,320,000 km) from Mars. Durda was first identified as 1983 AZ_{2} at Karl Schwarzschild Observatory in 1983, extending the body's observation arc by 9 years prior to its official discovery observation at Kitt Peak.

== Lightcurve ==
In October 2009, a rotational lightcurve was obtained from photometric observations by Brian Warner at the Palmer Divide Station in Colorado. Lightcurve analysis gave a rotation period of 460±5 hours with a brightness variation of 0.50 magnitude (U=2+). Durda belongs to the Top 100 slow rotators known to exists.

== Diameter ==
Based on a magnitude-to-diameter conversion, Durda's generic diameter is between 3 and 7 kilometer for an absolute magnitude of 14.4, and an assumed albedo in the range of 0.05 to 0.25. Since asteroids in the inner main-belt are typically of stony rather than carbonaceous composition, with albedos above 0.20, Durda's diameter can be estimate to measure around 4 kilometers, as the higher its albedo (reflectivity), the lower the body's diameter. The Collaborative Asteroid Lightcurve Link assumes an albedo of 0.30 – a compromise value between 0.4 and 0.2, corresponding to the Hungaria asteroids both as family and orbital group – and calculates a diameter of 3.20 kilometers.

== Naming ==
This minor planet was named in honor of American planetary scientist Daniel D. Durda, who has researched the generation, evolution, size distribution and fragmentation of minor planets, resulting in the formation of minor-planet moons. He was especially interested in (243) Ida I Dactyl when he was member of the Galileo mission team. Daniel Durda is also a pilot and an artist of astronomical paintings. In 2015, he was awarded the Carl Sagan Medal for "communicating the wonder of planetary science through visual artistry". The approved naming citation was published by the Minor Planet Center on 8 August 1998 (M.P.C. 32345).
