= Institute for Earth & Space Exploration =

Academic unit operating at the University of Western Ontario

Location
- Western Interdisciplinary Research Building, Perth Drive, London, Ontario, Canada

Information
- Former name: Centre for Planetary Science and Exploration (CPSX) (2007-2019)
- Established: 2007

The Institute for Earth & Space Exploration (previously the Centre for Planetary Science and Exploration (CPSX)), is an academic unit operating at the University of Western Ontario (UWO). Founded in 2007, and dedicated in 2008 alongside the Canadian Lunar Research Network, it is the largest single group of planetary scientists (and related research professionals) working at an educational institution within Canada. Research focuses on planetary atmospheres, surfaces, and interiors along with cosmochemistry, dynamics, astrobiology, space systems, telerobotics, and the history of space exploration.

In 2008, CPSX became the first international partner of the NASA Lunar Science Institute, and become a node of the Canadian Lunar Research Network.

In addition to its research facilities, CPSX offers degree programs through UWO for undergraduate and graduate students at umbrella programs. Graduate students enrolling must be admitted into either the Physics and Astronomy program or the Geology or Geophysics programs in order to transfer into the CPSX graduate degree programs.

In June, 2019, CPSX became the Institute for Earth & Space Exploration.
