= Field of regard =

Total area that can be captured by a movable sensor

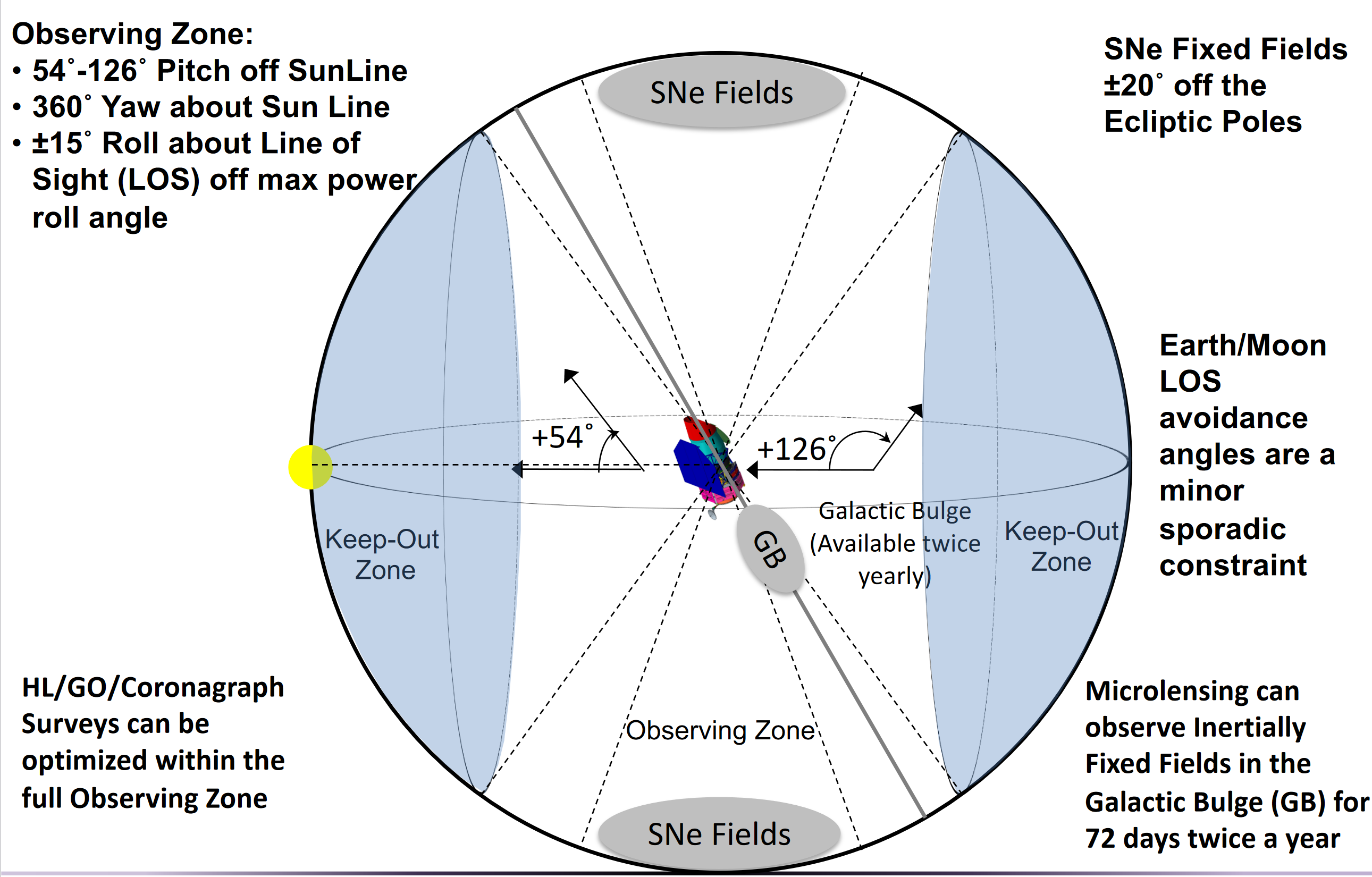
Field of Regard of Roman Space Telescope.

The field of regard (abbreviated FOR) is the total area that can be captured by a movable sensor. It should not be confused with the field of view (FOV), which is the angular cone perceivable by the sensor at a particular time instant. The field of regard is the total area that a sensing system can perceive by pointing the sensor, which is typically much larger than the sensor's FOV. For a stationary sensor, the FOR and FOV coincide (i.e. FOR=FOV).

== See also ==
- Panorama
