= Piet Hut =

Dutch astrophysicist (born 1952)

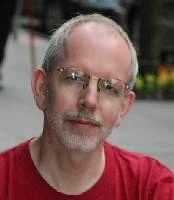
- Piet Hut
- Born: September 26, 1952 (age 73); Utrecht
- Education: Utrecht University; University of Amsterdam
- Known for: Barnes–Hut algorithm Pseudo-synchronization
- Scientific career
- Fields: Astrophysics; Interdisciplinary Studies
- Workplaces: Institute for Advanced Study
- Doctoral advisor: Ed van den Heuvel

Piet Hut (born September 26, 1952) is a Dutch astrophysicist and interdisciplinary researcher known for his contributions to both scientific research and cross-disciplinary scholarship. He served as the head of the interdisciplinary studies program at the Institute for Advanced Study, where he collaborated with scholars from diverse fields, including natural science, computer science, cognitive psychology, and philosophy. His work also encompasses research in computer simulations of dense stellar systems.

He was the Head of the Program in Interdisciplinary Studies at the Institute for Advanced Study (IAS) from 2002 until 2023. Asteroid 17031 Piethut is named after him, in honor of his work in planetary dynamics and for co-founding the B612 Foundation, which focuses on the prevention of asteroid impacts on Earth.

== Career ==
In the Netherlands, Hut did a double PhD program, at Utrecht University, in particle physics under Martinus Veltman and in Amsterdam in astrophysics under Ed van den Heuvel, resulting in a PhD at the University of Amsterdam.

Previously an assistant professor at the University of California, Berkeley, Hut was in 1985, at the age of 32, appointed as a full professor at the Institute for Advanced Study. At the time, he was the youngest professor appointed there.

Hut became a corresponding member of the Royal Netherlands Academy of Arts and Sciences in 1996.

== Astrophysics research ==
An accomplished astrophysicist, Hut is best known for the Barnes–Hut simulation algorithm, developed with Joshua Barnes. By using a tree-based data structure, the Barnes–Hut method significantly speeds up the calculation of the gravitational motion of large numbers of stars, making accessible such problems as collisions between galaxies. Barnes–Hut simulation algorithm, which has become a standard in n-body problems, reduces its complexity to O(N log N).

In 1986, while at the Institute for Advanced Studies, he conceived NEMO, a software environment for stellar dynamics, together with Josh Barnes and Peter Teuben.

Hut introduced the concept of pseudo-synchronicity, which is now widely cited in the literature on tidal evolution of exoplanets.

He co-authored a graduate textbook The Gravitational Million Body Problem, invented a mathematical sequence called Piet Hut's "coat-hanger" sequence, and has pioneered the use of virtual worlds for research and education in (astro)physics.

Hut is one of the founders of the B612 Foundation, MODEST, MICA, ACS, the GRAPE (Gravity Pipe) project, and AMUSE.

== Interdisciplinary research ==
Hut's broadly interdisciplinary research started with his study of an asteroid impact to explain the demise of the dinosaurs, when he edited a review article for Nature with four paleontologists, two geologists and one other astrophysicist. He has also widely engaged in joint research with computer scientists and philosophers and cognitive psychologists.

In recognition of his work, he was invited to participate in various conferences, spanning a range from a workshop with the 14th Dalai Lama and five physicists in Dharamsala, India to the World Economic Forum in Davos, Switzerland, and he has been invited as a member of the Husserl Circle.

Hut is one of the founders of the Kira Institute.

== Employment controversy ==
In July 2000, IAS sued Hut in federal district court, seeking to enforce a 1996 agreement in which Hut had promised to resign by mid-2001. According to IAS Director Phillip Griffiths, Hut had been hired with the expectation that he would eventually succeed Professor John N. Bahcall as leader of the astrophysics group, but "was not performing" at the required level. Hut rebutted that his work was not inferior but only seen as unfashionable, and that he had been coerced into signing the agreement. Many prominent astrophysicists defended the quality of Hut's work, while others based their support on the importance of academic tenure to creative scholarship. The case was eventually settled out of court. Hut transferred out of IAS's School of Natural Sciences and was appointed Head of a new Program in Interdisciplinary Studies.

== See also ==
- Galaxy formation and evolution
- Large-scale structure of the cosmos
