= Asteroid mining =

Exploitation of raw materials from asteroids

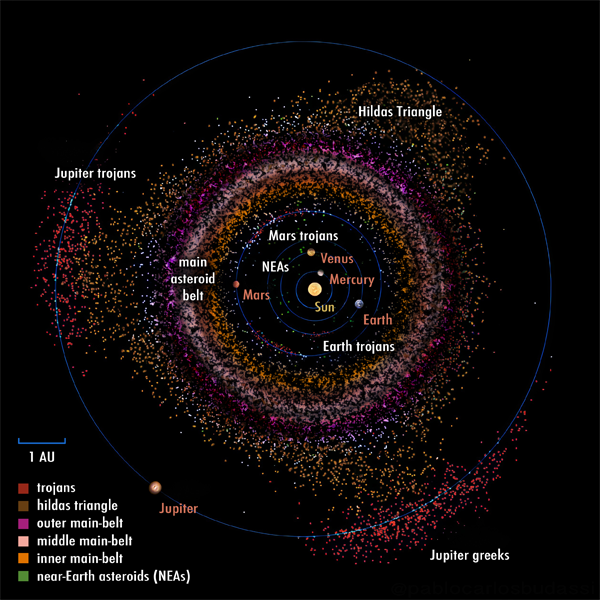
Overview of the Inner Solar System asteroids up to the Jovian System

Asteroid mining is the hypothetical and technically possible extraction of materials from asteroids and other minor planets, including near-Earth objects.

Research missions focused on asteroid sample return, including Hayabusa, Hayabusa2, OSIRIS-REx, and Tianwen-2, illustrate the challenges of collecting ore from space using current technology. As of 2024, around 127 grams of asteroid material have been successfully brought to Earth from space. Asteroid research missions are complex endeavors that yield a tiny amount of material: less than 100 milligrams for Hayabusa, 5.4 grams for Hayabusa2, and approximately 121.6 grams for OSIRIS-REx, with Tianwen-2 mission currently ongoing. These figures are comparatively negligible when considering the substantial investments and resources allocated to these projects ($300 million for Hayabusa, $800 million for Hayabusa2, $1.16 billion for OSIRIS-REx and $70 million for Tianwen-2).

Notable asteroid mining challenges include the high cost of spaceflight, unreliable identification of asteroids that are suitable for mining, and the challenges of extracting usable material in a space environment.

== History ==
=== Prior to 1970 ===
Before 1970, asteroid mining existed largely within the realm of science fiction. Publications such as Worlds of If, Scavengers in Space, and Miners in the Sky told stories about the conceived dangers, motives, and experiences of mining asteroids. At the same time, many researchers in academia speculated about the profits that could be gained from asteroid mining, but they lacked the technology to seriously pursue the idea.

=== The 1970s ===
In 1969, the Apollo 11 Moon Landing spurred a wave of scientific interest in human space activity far beyond the Earth's orbit. In the following decade, increasing academic interest surrounded the topic of asteroid mining. A sizeable portion of serious academic consideration was aimed at mining asteroids located closer to Earth than the main asteroid belt. In particular, the asteroid groups Apollo and Amor were considered. These groups were chosen not only because of their proximity to Earth but also because many at the time thought they were rich in raw materials that could be refined.

Despite the wave of interest, many in the space science community were aware of how little was known about asteroids and encouraged a more gradual and systematic approach to asteroid mining.

=== The 1980s ===
Academic interest in asteroid mining continued into the 1980s. The idea of targeting the Apollo and Amor asteroid groups still had some popularity. However, by the late 1980s, the interest in the Apollo and Amor asteroid groups was being replaced with interest in the moons of Mars, Phobos and Deimos.

Governmental organizations and space agencies, such as NASA, begin to formulate ideas of how to process materials in space and what to do with the materials that are hypothetically gathered from space.

=== The 1990s ===
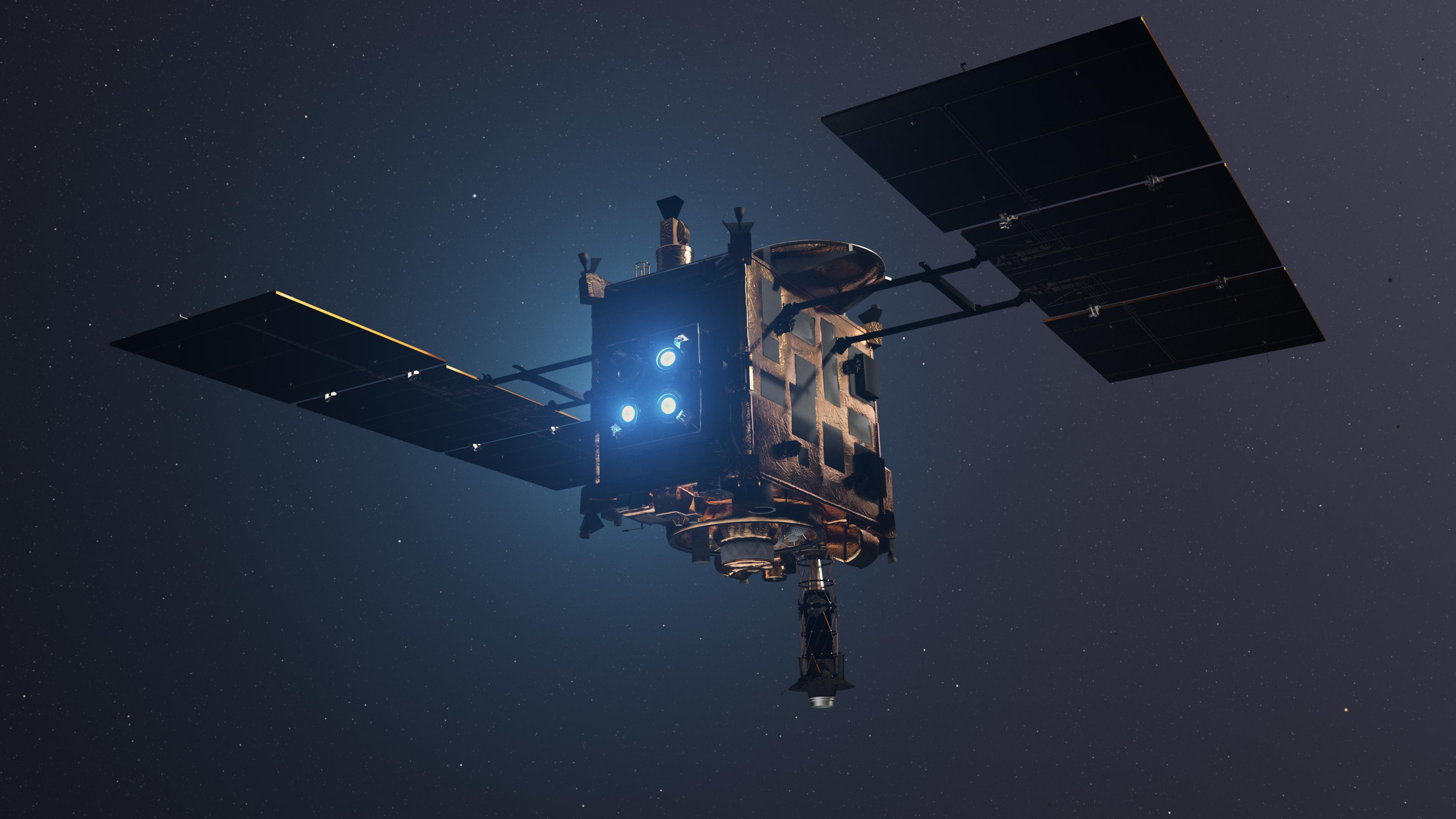
Hayabusa2 asteroid sample-return mission (3 December 2014 – 5 December 2020)

New reasons emerged for pursuing asteroid mining. These reasons tended to revolve around environmental concerns, such as fears over humans over-consuming the Earth's natural resources and trying to capture energy from the Sun in space.

In the same decade, NASA was trying to establish what materials in asteroids could be valuable for extraction. These materials included free metals, volatiles, and bulk dirt.

=== The 2010s ===
After a burst of interest in the 2010s, asteroid mining ambitions shifted to more distant long-term goals, and some 'asteroid mining' companies pivoted to more general-purpose propulsion technology.

On 24 April 2012, at the Seattle, Washington Museum of Flight, a plan was announced by billionaire entrepreneurs to mine asteroids for their resources. The company was called Planetary Resources, and its founders included aerospace entrepreneurs Eric Anderson and Peter Diamandis. The company announced plans to create a propellant depot in space by 2020, aiming to develop the process of splitting water from asteroids into hydrogen and oxygen to replenish satellites and spacecraft. Advisers included film director and explorer James Cameron; investors included Google's chief executive Larry Page, and its executive chairman was Eric Schmidt. Telescope technology proposed to identify and examine candidate asteroids lead to development of the Arkyd family of spacecraft; two prototypes of which were flown in 2015 and 2018. Shortly after, all plans for the Arkyd space telescope technology were abandoned; the company was wound down, its hardware auctioned off, and remaining assets acquired by ConsenSys, a blockchain company.

A year after the appearance of Planetary Resources, similar asteroid mining plans were announced in 2013 by Deep Space Industries; a company established by David Gump, Rick Tumlinson, and others. The initial goal was to visit asteroids with prospecting and sample return spacecraft in 2015 and 2016; and begin mining within ten years. Deep Space Industries later pivoted to developing & selling the propulsion systems that would enable its envisioned asteroid operations, including a successful line of water-propellant thrusters in 2018; and in 2019 was acquired by Bradford Space, a company with a portfolio of earth orbit systems and space flight components.

=== The 2020s ===
The 2020s brought a resurgence of interest, with companies from the United States, Europe, and China renewing their efforts fueled by a new era of commercial space exploration, significantly driven by SpaceX. SpaceX's development of reusable rocket boosters substantially lowered the cost of space access, reigniting interest and investment in asteroid mining. A US congressional committee acknowledged this interest by holding a hearing on the topic in December 2023. There are also endeavors to make first-time landings on M-type asteroids to mine metals like iridium which sells for many thousands of dollars per ounce. Private company driven efforts have also given rise to a new culture of secrecy obfuscating which asteroids are identified and targeted for mining missions, whereas previously government-led asteroid research and exploration operated with more transparency.

== Minerals in space ==
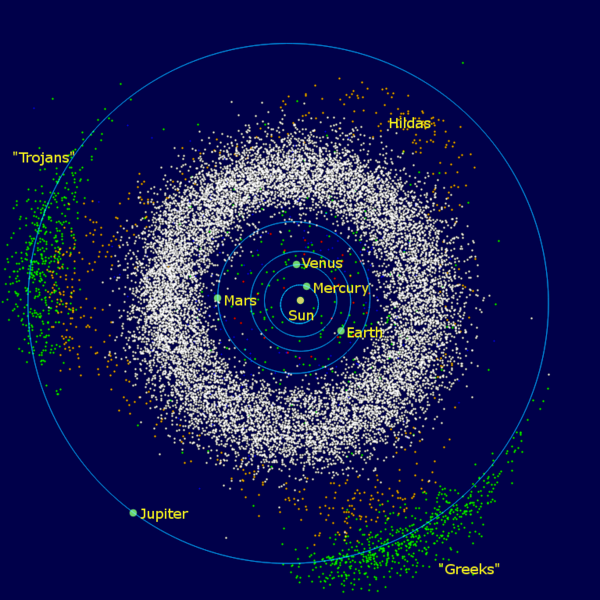
The asteroids of the inner Solar System and Jupiter: The belt is located between the orbits of Jupiter and Mars.: Sun; Jupiter trojans Orbits of planets / Asteroid belt Hilda asteroids (Hildas); Near-Earth objects (selection)

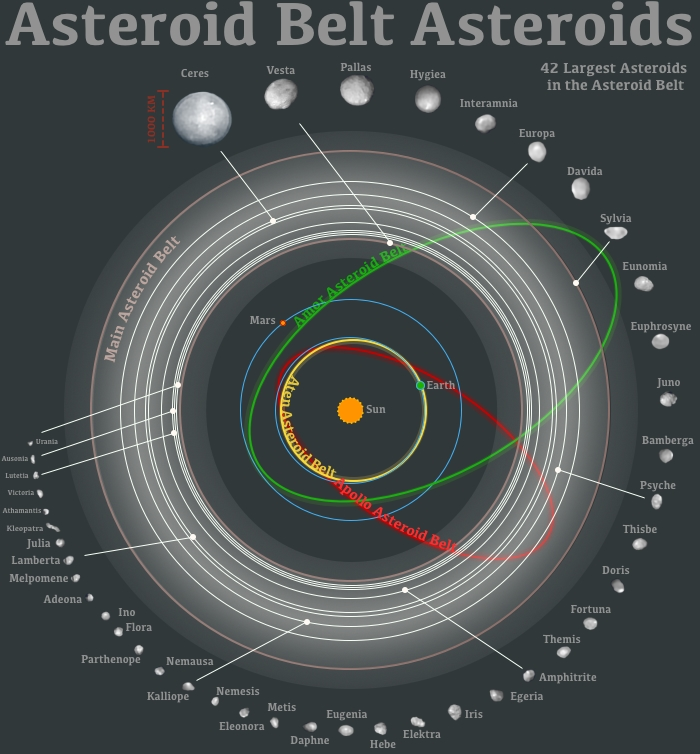
Main Asteroid Belt 42 largest asteroids Amor asteroid belt Apollo asteroid belt Aten asteroid belt

As concerns about resource depletion on Earth have increased, the prospect of extracting valuable elements from asteroids for use on Earth—or using space-based resources to build solar-power satellites and space habitats, has attracted greater interest. Hypothetically, water processed from ice could refuel orbiting propellant depots.

Although asteroids and Earth accreted from the same starting materials, Earth's relatively stronger gravity pulled all heavy siderophilic (iron-loving) elements into its core during its molten youth more than four billion years ago. This left the crust depleted of such valuable elements until a rain of asteroid impacts re-infused the depleted crust with metals like gold, cobalt, iron, manganese, molybdenum, nickel, osmium, palladium, platinum, rhenium, rhodium, ruthenium and tungsten (some flow from core to surface does occur, e.g. at the Bushveld Igneous Complex, a famously rich source of platinum-group metals). Today, these metals are mined from Earth's crust, and they are essential for economic and technological progress. Hence, the geologic history of Earth may have set the stage for a future of asteroid mining.

In 2006, the Keck Observatory announced that the binary Jupiter trojan 617 Patroclus, and possibly large numbers of other Jupiter trojans, are likely extinct comets and consist largely of water ice. Similarly, Jupiter-family comets, and possibly near-Earth asteroids that are extinct comets, might also provide water. The process of in-situ resource utilization—using materials native to space for propellant, thermal management, tankage, radiation shielding, and other high-mass components of space infrastructure—could lead to radical reductions in its cost. Although whether these cost reductions could be achieved, and if achieved would offset the enormous infrastructure investment required, is unclear.

From the astrobiological perspective, asteroid prospecting could provide scientific data for the search for extraterrestrial intelligence (SETI). Some astrophysicists have suggested that if advanced extraterrestrial civilizations employed asteroid mining long ago, the hallmarks of these activities might be detectable.

An important factor to consider in target selection is orbital economics, in particular the change in velocity (Δv) and travel time to and from the target. More of the extracted native material must be expended as propellant in higher Δv trajectories, thus less would be returned as payload. Direct Hohmann trajectories are faster than Hohmann trajectories assisted by planetary and/or lunar flybys, which in turn are faster than those of the Interplanetary Transport Network, but the reduction in transfer time comes at the cost of increased Δv requirements.

Mission	Δv (km/s)
Earth surface to LEO	8.0
LEO to near-Earth asteroid	5.5 (Note: This is the average amount; asteroids with much lower delta-v exist.)
LEO to lunar surface	6.3
LEO to moons of Mars	8.0

The Easily Recoverable Object (ERO) subclass of Near-Earth asteroids are considered likely candidates for early mining activity. Their low Δv makes them suitable for use in extracting construction materials for near-Earth space-based facilities, greatly reducing the economic cost of transporting supplies into Earth orbit.

The table above shows a comparison of Δv requirements for various missions. In terms of propulsion energy requirements, a mission to a near-Earth asteroid compares favorably to alternative mining missions.

An example of a potential target for an early asteroid mining expedition is 4660 Nereus, expected to be mainly enstatite. This body has a very low Δv compared to lifting materials from the surface of the Moon. However, it would require a much longer round-trip to return the material.

Multiple types of asteroids have been identified but the three main types would include the C-type, S-type, and M-type asteroids:

- C-type asteroids have a high abundance of water which is not currently of use for mining, but could be used in an exploration effort beyond the asteroid. Mission costs could be reduced by using the available water from the asteroid. C-type asteroids also have high amounts of organic carbon, phosphorus, and other key ingredients for fertilizer which could be used to grow food.
- S-type asteroids carry little water but are more attractive because they contain numerous metals, including nickel, cobalt, and more valuable metals, such as gold, platinum, and rhodium. A small 10-meter S-type asteroid contains about 650,000 kg (1,433,000 lb) of metal with 50 kg (110 lb) in the form of rare metals like platinum and gold.
- M-type asteroids are rare but contain up to 10 times more metal than S-types.

A class of "easily retrievable objects" (EROs) was identified by a group of researchers in 2013. Twelve asteroids made up the initially identified group, all of which could be potentially mined with present-day rocket technology. Of 9,000 asteroids searched in the NEO database, these twelve could all be brought into an Earth-accessible orbit by changing their velocity by less than 500 meters per second (1,800 km/h; 1,100 mph). The dozen asteroids range in size from 2 to 20 meters (10 to 70 ft).

== Mining considerations ==
There are four options for mining:

1. In-space manufacturing (ISM), which may be enabled by biomining.
2. Bring raw asteroidal material to Earth for use.
3. Process asteroidal material on-site to bring back only processed materials, and perhaps produce propellant for the return trip.
4. Transport the asteroid to a safe orbit around the Moon or Earth or to a space station. This can hypothetically allow for most materials to be used and not wasted.

Processing in situ for the purpose of extracting high-value minerals will reduce the energy requirements for transporting the materials, although the processing facilities must first be transported to the mining site. In situ mining will involve drilling boreholes and injecting hot fluid/gas and allow the useful material to react or melt with the solvent and extract the solute. Due to the weak gravitational fields of asteroids, any activities, like drilling, will cause large disturbances and form dust clouds. These might be confined by some dome or bubble barrier. Or else some means of dissipating any dust could be provided.

Mining operations require special equipment to handle the extraction and processing of ore in outer space. The machinery will need to be anchored to the body, but once in place, the ore can be moved about more readily due to the lack of gravity. However, no techniques for refining ore in zero gravity currently exist. Docking with an asteroid might be performed using a harpoon-like process, where a projectile would penetrate the surface to serve as an anchor; then an attached cable would be used to winch the vehicle to the surface, if the asteroid is both penetrable and rigid enough for a harpoon to be effective.

Due to the distance from Earth to an asteroid selected for mining, the round-trip time for communications will be several minutes or more, except during occasional close approaches to Earth by near-Earth asteroids. Thus any mining equipment will either need to be highly automated, or a human presence will be needed nearby. Humans would also be useful for troubleshooting problems and for maintaining the equipment. On the other hand, multi-minute communications delays have not prevented the success of robotic exploration of Mars, and automated systems would be much less expensive to build and deploy.

== Economics ==
Currently, the quality of the ore and the consequent cost and mass of equipment required to extract it are unknown and can only be speculated on. Some economic analyses indicate that the cost of returning asteroidal materials to Earth far outweighs their market value, and that asteroid mining will not attract private investment at current commodity prices and space transportation costs. Other studies suggest large profit by using solar power. Potential markets for materials can be identified and profit generated if extraction cost is brought down. For example, the delivery of multiple tonnes of water to low Earth orbit for rocket fuel preparation for space tourism could generate significant profit if space tourism itself proves profitable.

In 1997, it was speculated that a relatively small metallic asteroid with a diameter of 1.6 km (1 mi) contains more than US$20 trillion worth of industrial and precious metals. A comparatively small M-type asteroid with a mean diameter of 1 km (0.62 mi) could contain more than two billion metric tons of iron–nickel ore, or two to three times the world production of 2004. The asteroid 16 Psyche is believed to contain 1.7×10^{19} kg of nickel–iron, which could supply the world production requirement for several million years. A small portion of the extracted material would also be precious metals.

Not all mined materials from asteroids would be cost-effective, especially for the potential return of economic amounts of material to Earth. For potential return to Earth, platinum is considered very rare in terrestrial geologic formations and therefore is potentially worth bringing some quantity for terrestrial use. Nickel, on the other hand, is quite abundant on Earth and being mined in many terrestrial locations, so the high cost of asteroid mining may not make it economically viable.

Although Planetary Resources indicated in 2012 that the platinum from a 30-meter-long (98 ft) asteroid could be worth US$25–50 billion, an economist remarked any outside source of precious metals could lower prices sufficiently to possibly doom the venture by rapidly increasing the available supply of such metals.

Development of an infrastructure for altering asteroid orbits could offer a large return on investment.

=== Scarcity ===
Scarcity is a fundamental economic problem of humans having seemingly unlimited wants in a world of limited resources. Since Earth's resources are finite, the relative abundance of asteroidal ore gives asteroid mining the potential to provide nearly unlimited resources, which could essentially eliminate scarcity for those materials.

The idea of exhausting resources is not new. In 1798, Thomas Malthus wrote, because resources are ultimately limited, the exponential growth in a population would result in falls in income per capita until poverty and starvation would result as a constricting factor on population. Malthus posited this 228 years ago, and no sign has yet emerged of the Malthus effect regarding raw materials.

- Proven reserves are deposits of mineral resources that are already discovered and known to be economically extractable under present or similar demand, price and other economic and technological conditions.
- Conditional reserves are discovered deposits that are not yet economically viable.
- Indicated reserves are less intensively measured deposits whose data is derived from surveys and geological projections. Hypothetical reserves and speculative resources make up this group of reserves.
- Inferred reserves are deposits that have been located but not yet exploited.

Continued development in asteroid mining techniques and technology may help to increase mineral discoveries. As the cost of extracting mineral resources, especially platinum group metals, on Earth rises, the cost of extracting the same resources from celestial bodies declines due to technological innovations around space exploration.

Asteroid tracking catalogs such as Asterank estimate about 700 known asteroids with a value exceeding US$100 trillion each.

=== Financial feasibility ===
Space ventures are high-risk, with long lead times and heavy capital investment, and that is no different for asteroid-mining projects. These types of ventures could be funded through private investment or through government investment. For a commercial venture, it can be profitable as long as the revenue earned is greater than total costs (costs for extraction and costs for marketing). The costs involving an asteroid-mining venture were estimated to be around US$100 billion in 1996.

There are six categories of cost considered for an asteroid mining venture:

1. Research and development costs
2. Exploration and prospecting costs
3. Construction and infrastructure development costs
4. Operational and engineering costs
5. Environmental costs
6. Time cost

Determining financial feasibility is best represented through net present value. One requirement needed for financial feasibility is a high return on investment estimating around 30%. Example calculation assumes for simplicity that the only valuable material on asteroids is platinum. On 16 August 2016, platinum was valued at $1157 per ounce or $37,000 per kilogram. At a price of $1,340, for a 10% return on investment, 173,400 kg (5,575,000 ozt) of platinum would have to be extracted for every 1,155,000 tons of asteroid ore. For a 50% return on investment 1,703,000 kg (54,750,000 ozt) of platinum would have to be extracted for every 11,350,000 tons of asteroid ore. This analysis assumes that doubling the supply of platinum to the market (5.13 million ounces in 2014) would have no effect on the price of platinum. An economics-based assessment would conclude increasing the supply of platinum without an obvious increase in demand will drive prices downward.

The financial feasibility of asteroid mining with regards to different technical parameters has been presented by Sonter and more recently by Hein et al. They have specifically explored the case where platinum is brought from space to Earth and estimate that economically viable asteroid mining for this specific case would be rather challenging.

Decreases in the price of space access matter. The start of operational use of the low-cost-per-kilogram-in-orbit Spacex Falcon Heavy launch vehicle in 2018 is projected by astronomer Martin Elvis to have increased the extent of economically minable near-Earth asteroids from hundreds to thousands. With the increased availability of several kilometers per second of delta-v that Falcon Heavy provides, it increases the number of NEAs accessible from 3 percent to around 45 percent.

Precedent for joint investment by multiple parties into a long-term venture to mine commodities may be found in the legal concept of a mining partnership, which exists in the state laws of multiple US states including California. In a mining partnership, "[Each] member of a mining partnership shares in the profits and losses thereof in the proportion which the interest or share he or she owns in the mine bears to the whole partnership capital or whole number of shares."

=== Mining the asteroid belt from Mars ===
Since Mars is much closer to the asteroid belt than Earth is, it would take less Delta-v to get to the asteroid belt and return minerals to Mars. One hypothesis is that the origin of the Moons of Mars (Phobos and Deimos) are actually asteroid captures from the asteroid belt. 16 Psyche in the main belt could have over $10,000 Quadrillion United States dollar worth of minerals. NASA launched a study mission on 13 October 2023 using the Psyche orbiter to get to the asteroid by August 2029. 511 Davida could have $27 quadrillion worth of minerals and resources. Using the Mars moon Phobos to launch spacecraft is energetically favorable and a useful location from which to dispatch missions to main belt asteroids. Mining the asteroid belt from Mars and its moons could help in the Colonization of Mars.

=== Phobos as a space elevator for Mars ===
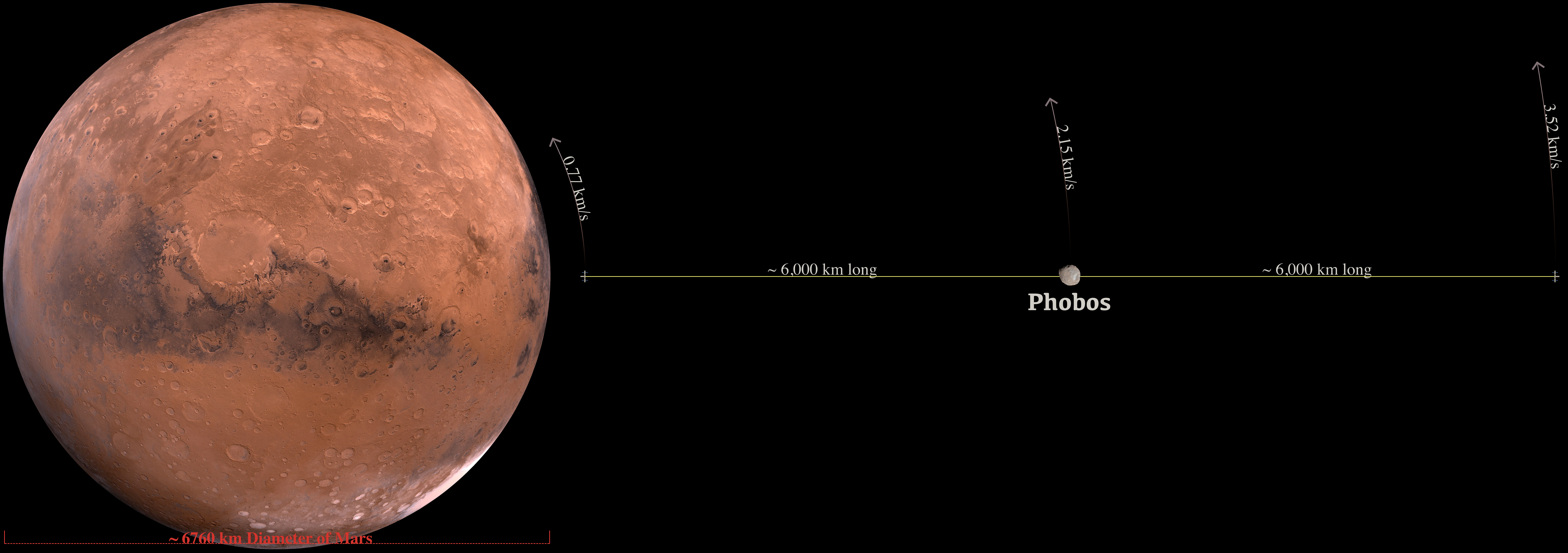
Space elevator concept between Phobos and Mars

Phobos is synchronously orbiting Mars, where the same face stays facing the planet at ~6,028 km above the Martian surface. A space elevator could extend from Phobos to Mars 6,000 km, about 28 kilometers from the surface, and just out of the atmosphere of Mars. A similar space elevator cable could extend out 6,000 km the opposite direction that would counterbalance Phobos. In total the space elevator would extend over 12,000 km which would be below Areostationary orbit of Mars (17,032 km). A rocket launch would be needed to get the rocket and cargo to the beginning of the space elevator 28 km above the surface. The surface of Mars is rotating at 0.25 km/s at the equator and the bottom of the space elevator would be rotating around Mars at 0.77 km/s, so only 0.52 km/s of Delta-v would be needed to get to the space elevator. Phobos orbits at 2.15 km/s and the outer most part of the space elevator would rotate around Mars at 3.52 km/s.

== Regulation and safety ==
Space law involves a specific set of international treaties, along with national statutory laws. The system and framework for international and domestic laws have emerged in part through the United Nations Office for Outer Space Affairs. The rules, terms and agreements that space law authorities consider to be part of the active body of international space law are the five international space treaties and five UN declarations. Approximately 100 nations and institutions were involved in negotiations. The space treaties cover many major issues such as arms control, non-appropriation of space, freedom of exploration, liability for damages, safety and rescue of astronauts and spacecraft, prevention of harmful interference with space activities and the environment, notification and registration of space activities, and the settlement of disputes. In exchange for assurances from the space power, the nonspacefaring nations acquiesced to U.S. and Soviet proposals to treat outer space as a commons (res communis) territory which belonged to no one state.

Asteroid mining in particular is covered by both international treaties—for example, the Outer Space Treaty—and national statutory laws—for example, specific legislative acts in the United States and Luxembourg.

Varying degrees of criticism exist regarding international space law. Some critics accept the Outer Space Treaty, but reject the Moon Agreement. The Outer Space Treaty allows private property rights for outer space natural resources once removed from the surface, subsurface or subsoil of the Moon and other celestial bodies in outer space. Thus, international space law is capable of managing newly emerging space mining activities, private space transportation, commercial spaceports and commercial space stations, habitats and settlements. Space mining involving the extraction and removal of natural resources from their natural location is allowable under the Outer Space Treaty. Once removed, those natural resources can be reduced to possession, sold, traded and explored or used for scientific purposes. International space law allows space mining, specifically the extraction of natural resources. It is generally understood within the space law authorities that extracting space resources is allowable, even by private companies for profit. However, international space law prohibits property rights over territories and outer space land.

Astrophysicists Carl Sagan and Steven J. Ostro raised the concern altering the trajectories of asteroids near Earth might pose a collision hazard threat. They concluded that orbit engineering has both opportunities and dangers: if controls instituted on orbit-manipulation technology were too tight, future spacefaring could be hampered, but if they were too loose, human civilization would be at risk.

=== The Outer Space Treaty ===
Outer Space Treaty: Parties Signatories Non-parties

After ten years of negotiations between nearly 100 nations, the Outer Space Treaty opened for signature on 27 January 1966. It entered into force as the constitution for outer space on 10 October 1967. The Outer Space Treaty was well received; it was ratified by ninety-six nations and signed by an additional twenty-seven states. The outcome has been that the basic foundation of international space law consists of five (arguably four) international space treaties, along with various written resolutions and declarations. The main international treaty is the Outer Space Treaty of 1967; it is generally viewed as the "Constitution" for outer space. By ratifying the Outer Space Treaty of 1967, ninety-eight nations agreed that outer space would belong to the "province of mankind", that all nations would have the freedom to "use" and "explore" outer space, and that both these provisions must be done in a way to "benefit all mankind".

The province of mankind principle and the other key terms have not yet been specifically defined. Critics have complained that the Outer Space Treaty is vague. Yet, international space law has worked well and has served space commercial industries and interests for many decades. The taking away and extraction of Moon rocks, for example, has been treated as being legally permissible.

The framers of Outer Space Treaty initially focused on solidifying broad terms first, with the intent to create more specific legal provisions later (Griffin, 1981: 733–734). This is why the members of the COPUOS later expanded the Outer Space Treaty norms by articulating more specific understandings which are found in the "three supplemental agreements" – the Rescue and Return Agreement of 1968, the Liability Convention of 1973, and the Registration Convention of 1976.

Hobe (2007) explains that the Outer Space Treaty "explicitly and implicitly prohibits only the acquisition of territorial property rights" but extracting space resources is allowable. It is generally understood within the space law authorities that extracting space resources is allowable, even by private companies for profit. However, international space law prohibits property rights over territories and outer space land. Hobe further explains that there is no mention of "the question of the extraction of natural resources which means that such use is allowed under the Outer Space Treaty" (2007: 211). He also points out that there is an unsettled question regarding the division of benefits from outer space resources in accordance with Article, paragraph 1 of the Outer Space Treaty.

=== The Moon Agreement ===
Participation in the Moon Treaty Parties Signatories Non-parties

The Moon Agreement was signed on 18 December 1979, as part of the United Nations Charter and it entered into force in 1984 after a five state ratification consensus procedure, agreed upon by the members of the United Nations Committee on Peaceful Uses of Outer Space (COPUOS). As of September 2019, only 18 nations have signed or ratified the treaty. The other three outer space treaties experienced a high level of international cooperation in terms of signage and ratification, but the Moon Treaty went further than them, by defining the Common Heritage concept in more detail and by imposing specific obligations on the parties engaged in the exploration and/or exploitation of outer space. The Moon Treaty explicitly designates the Moon and its natural resources as part of the Common Heritage of Mankind.

The Article 11 establishes that lunar resources are "not subject to national appropriation by claim of sovereignty, by means of use or occupation, or by any other means". However, exploitation of resources is suggested to be allowed if it is "governed by an international regime" (Article 11.5), but the rules of such regime have not yet been established. S. Neil Hosenball, the NASA General Counsel and chief US negotiator for the Moon Treaty, cautioned in 2018 that negotiation of the rules of the international regime should be delayed until the feasibility of exploitation of lunar resources has been established.

The objection to the treaty by the spacefaring nations is held to be the requirement that extracted resources (and the technology used to that end) must be shared with other nations. The similar regime in the United Nations Convention on the Law of the Sea is believed to impede the development of such industries on the seabed.

The United States, the Russian Federation, and the People's Republic of China (PRC) have neither signed, acceded to, nor ratified the Moon Agreement.

=== Legal regimes of some countries ===
==== Luxembourg ====
In February 2016, the Government of Luxembourg said that it would attempt to "jump-start an industrial sector to mine asteroid resources in space" by, among other things, creating a "legal framework" and regulatory incentives for companies involved in the industry. By June 2016, it announced that it would "invest more than US$200 million in research, technology demonstration, and in the direct purchase of equity in companies relocating to Luxembourg". In 2017, it became the "first European country to pass a law conferring to companies the ownership of any resources they extract from space", and remained active in advancing space resource public policy in 2018.

In 2017, Japan, Portugal, and the UAE entered into cooperation agreements with Luxembourg for mining operations in celestial bodies.

In 2018, the Luxembourg Space Agency was created. It provides private companies and organizations working on asteroid mining with financial support.

==== United States ====
Some nations are beginning to promulgate legal regimes for extraterrestrial resource extraction. For example, the United States "SPACE Act of 2015"—facilitating private development of space resources consistent with US international treaty obligations—passed the US House of Representatives in July 2015. In November 2015 it passed the United States Senate. On 25 November U.S. President Barack Obama signed the H.R.2262 – U.S. Commercial Space Launch Competitiveness Act into law. The law recognizes the right of U.S. citizens to own space resources they obtain and encourages the commercial exploration and use of resources from asteroids. According to the article § 51303 of the law:

A United States citizen engaged in commercial recovery of an asteroid resource or a space resource under this chapter shall be entitled to any asteroid resource or space resource obtained, including to possess, own, transport, use, and sell the asteroid resource or space resource obtained in accordance with applicable law, including the international obligations of the United States

On 6 April 2020 U.S. President Donald Trump signed the Executive Order on Encouraging International Support for the Recovery and Use of Space Resources. According to the Order:

- Americans should have the right to engage in commercial exploration, recovery, and use of resources in outer space
- the US does not view space as a "global commons"
- the US opposes the Moon Agreement

== Environmental impact ==
A positive impact of asteroid mining has been conjectured as being an enabler of transferring industrial activities into space, such as energy generation. A quantitative analysis of the potential environmental benefits of water and platinum mining in space has been developed, where potentially large benefits could materialize, depending on the ratio of material mined in space and mass launched into space.

Asteroid mining, or off-Earth Mining (OEM), is occasionally promoted as a sustainable alternative to terrestrial extraction, with the potential to reduce ecological degradation on Earth. Metals such as platinum and palladium, which are comparatively scarce on Earth but more abundant in some near-Earth asteroids (NEAs) such as 16 Psyche are likely to be primary targets for future resource return missions.

=== Space debris ===
Mining on asteroids is expected to generate large amounts of dust due to the fine-grained nature of regolith on these bodies. This dust is not only abrasive, due to a high glass content, but can also be sticky, clinging to equipment and spacesuits. Previous missions, such as all 6 Apollo missions (11, 12, 14, 15, 16, and 17) reported serious issues with lunar dust (similar dust can occur on asteroids) interfering with mechanical systems, visibility, and even posing health risks to astronauts. Similar challenges are anticipated during asteroid mining, where dust may travel significant distances and impact nearby operations. Managing this risk will be crucial for the environmental and technical success of future OEM activities

Asteroid mining has the potential to worsen the existing issue of space debris, particularly if large-scale operations are introduced without adequate regulation. These missions are likely to involve multiple spacecraft, automated mining systems, and transportation vehicles, all of which carry the risk of contributing additional debris to orbit. Fragments of rock, dust, or equipment failures during extraction or transit phases could increase congestion in already crowded orbital pathways. This would heighten the risk of in-orbit collisions, contributing to what is known as the Kessler syndrome, a scenario where debris collisions generate more debris, leading to a self-perpetuating cascade effect. Kessler's Syndrome poses serious risks to satellite functionality, potentially disrupting essential services and utilities and significantly impacting global stability. According to the European Space Agency over 36,000 objects larger than 10 cm are currently being tracked in Earth's orbit, and so if mitigation strategies are not put in place, asteroid mining could significantly impact the long-term safety and sustainability of space activities.

=== Contamination of celestial bodies ===
Although OEM will differ in many ways from operations on Earth, the risk of contamination from spills or accidents remains an important concern. On Earth, spills from mining and processing have caused long-term environmental damage that has often been difficult to reverse. It's crucial that similar risks are taken seriously in space, with strong safeguards and contingency plans in place from the outset.

Rare earth mining on Earth has severe health and environmental consequences, including radioactive contamination of waterways, increased rates of cancer in affected communities, arsenic poisoning, and long-term degradation of soil and water systems. While these impacts are terrestrial, the same extractive logic based on environmental sacrifice and regulatory avoidance, could be extended to off-Earth contexts. If left unregulated, OEM could lead to similar disregard for the integrity of planetary bodies, treating them as consequence-free zones for contamination.

Several asteroids are thought to be relatively untouched since the early formation of the solar system, making them valuable targets for scientific research. These bodies may contain important clues about the distribution of water, the presence of organic compounds, and the conditions under which planets formed.

Planetary protection is a set of international guidelines designed to prevent harmful contamination of celestial bodies. For example, although most asteroids are not expected to support life, the accidental introduction of Earth-based microbes or substances could still compromise their natural state. The Committee on Space Research (COSPAR) also outlines procedures to minimise biological contamination, but enforcement may become increasingly difficult as commercial missions expand into deep space.

=== Unsustainable mining techniques ===
Mining techniques, such as surface excavation, thermal extraction and electrostatic separation could permanently disturb their physical and chemical makeup, limiting future opportunities for scientific study.

I. Pneumatic excavation is considered one of the least sustainable techniques due to its high energy requirements and potential to generate hazardous debris in microgravity environments.

II. Thermal and chemical extraction can be extremely energy-intensive and may leave behind harmful by-products, raising concerns about long-term environmental impacts.

III. Electrostatic separation, while effective in theory, poses sustainability challenges in space due to its significant power demands and sensitivity to environmental conditions.

=== Landscape changes ===
The geology and geomorphology of celestial bodies offer important insights into the history of the Solar System and the formation of asteroids, moons and terrestrial planets. Changes to these features because of OEM could be detrimental to scientific research. Without flowing water, landscapes on bodies such as the Moon change very slowly, shaped mainly by meteorite impacts. This means that any anthropogenic changes could be effectively permanent or at least, long-term.

The scale of OEM proposals varies; some may involve extensive regolith excavation, potentially altering key geomorphological features, while others may have minimal impact. Effects on geological formations such as layers, hollows and caverns should be considered.

On Earth, mining often leads to temporary or permanent landscape changes, and sites suitable for OEM may also be targeted for future human settlement. Irreversible alterations could reduce the habitability of these areas. Therefore, OEM planning should consider how landscape changes might be minimised, reversed, or adapted to support post-mining uses.

=== Carbon emissions and atmospheric impact ===
Although asteroid mining takes place beyond Earth's atmosphere, it still carries significant environmental consequences here on Earth, particularly in relation to carbon emissions. The process relies heavily on regular rocket launches, which currently emit pollutants such as black carbon, water vapour, and nitrogen oxides into the stratosphere. These particles can disrupt atmospheric chemistry and contribute to ozone layer depletion and radiative forcing, both of which are linked to climate change. Unlike emissions released at lower altitudes, pollutants in the upper atmosphere remain for longer periods due to the lack of rain. As demand for space-based operations grows, including those related to asteroid mining, the environmental burden of launch emissions could become increasingly significant. Unregulated growth in the space sector may lead to measurable impacts on Earth's climate systems over time.

== Demonstrating technological capacity ==
Missions demonstrating technological capacity and capability are precursors enabling the complex solutions necessary for extra-terrestrial resource exploitation and mining.

=== Space mission firsts by country ===
Technological "stepping stones" comprise capabilities including flying by the object, orbiting the object, landing on the object, roving on the surface of the object, and returning a sample from an extraterrestrial object. Here are the list of "first" successful missions by country:

Nation	Flyby	Orbit	Land	Rover	Return sample
Moon
China	Chang'e 1 (2007)	Chang'e 1 (2007)	Chang'e 3 (2013)	Chang'e 3 (2013)	Chang'e 5 (2020)
European Union		SMART-1 (2003)			
India	Chandrayaan-1 (2008)	Chandrayaan-1 (2008) Mars Orbiter Mission (2014)	Chandrayaan-3 (2023)	Pragyan (2023)	
Japan	Hiten (1990)	Hiten (1992)	SLIM (2024)	LEV-1 (2024)	
USSR	Luna 1 (1959)	Luna 10 (1966)	Luna 9 (1966)	Lunokhod 1 (1970)	Luna 16 (1970)
United States	Pioneer 4 (1959)	Lunar Orbiter 1 (1966)	Surveyor 1 (1966)	Apollo 15 (1971)	Apollo 11 (1969)
Planet (e.g. Mars, Venus, etc.)
China	Tianwen-1 (2021)	Tianwen-1 (2021)	Tianwen-1 (2021)	Zhurong (2021)	
USSR	Venera 1 (1961)	Mars 2 (1971)	Venera 7 (1970)		
United States	Mariner 2 (1962)	Mariner 9 (1971)	Viking 1 (1976)	Sojourner (1997)	
Minor planet, asteroid, comet
China	Chang'e 2 (2012)				
European Union	ICE (1985)	Rosetta (2014)	Rosetta (2014)		
Japan	Suisei (1986)	Hayabusa (2005)	Hayabusa (2005)		Hayabusa (2010)
USSR	Vega 1 (1986)				
United States	ICE (1985)	NEAR (1997)	NEAR (2001)		Stardust (2006)

=== Additional completed and ongoing missions ===
- Hayabusa2 (completed) – JAXA asteroid sample return mission (arrived at the target in 2018, returned sample in 2020)
- OSIRIS-REx (completed) – NASA asteroid sample return mission (launched on 8 September 2016, arrived at target 2020, returned sample on 24 September 2023)
- Tianwen-2 (ongoing) – ongoing CNSA asteroid sample return mission (will arrive at the target in 2026, will return sample in 2027)

=== Proposed Missions ===
Many missions have been initiated by both sovereign and commercial players to advance technologies necessary to support extra-planetary resource exploitation, including mining, as shown in the table below. For purposes of tracking technology development, this table includes missions with lunar, asteroid, planetary, and comet mission targets.

Nation	Organization	Inception Date	Mission	Purpose	Status
United States	SpaceDev	1997	Near Earth Asteroid Prospector	asteroid prospecting	Canceled
Russia	Roskomos	2009	Fobos-Grunt 2	sample return mission to Phobos	stranded in earth orbit (Nov 2011)
United States	NASA	2012-09	Robotic Asteroid Prospector	examine and evaluate the feasibility of asteroid mining in terms of means, methods, and systems.	canceled (Apr 2018)
United States	Kepler Energy and Space Engineering	2013-05	Cornucopia	automated mining to collect 40 tons of asteroid regolith and return to low Earth orbit by 2020.	status unknown
United States	NASA	2018	VIPER rover	prospect for lunar resources	canceled (Jul 2024)
United States	Planetoid Mines	2012	xTrac rover	continuous mining of lunar resources	active (Oct 2028)
United States	AstroForge	2022-05	Brokkr-1, Odin, and Vestri	develop technologies & spacecraft for prospecting, mining, and refining platinum from near-earth asteroids	TBD

=== Other precursor activities ===
==== Asteroid cataloging ====
To support the cataloging of potentially dangerous asteroids, NASA announced in September 2019 that a space-based infrared telescope will be developed and launched. NASA/JPL is developing the NEO Surveyor mission with budget from NASA's Planetary Defense Coordination Office, within the Planetary Science Division. Launch is planned for June 2028.

Private organizations including the B612 Foundation have conducted related research to help detect asteroids that could one day strike Earth, and find the technological means to divert their path to avoid such collisions. Plans have included a design and build a privately financed asteroid-finding space telescope, Sentinel in 2013. When private fundraising did not achieve goals, the program was canceled and the Foundation pursued alternate approaches using a constellation of much smaller spacecraft In August 2023, the Asteroid Institute, a program of the B612 foundation, announced the availability of the Asteroid Discovery Analysis and Mapping (ADAM) platform to enable ready public access to asteroid orbit data and related resources.

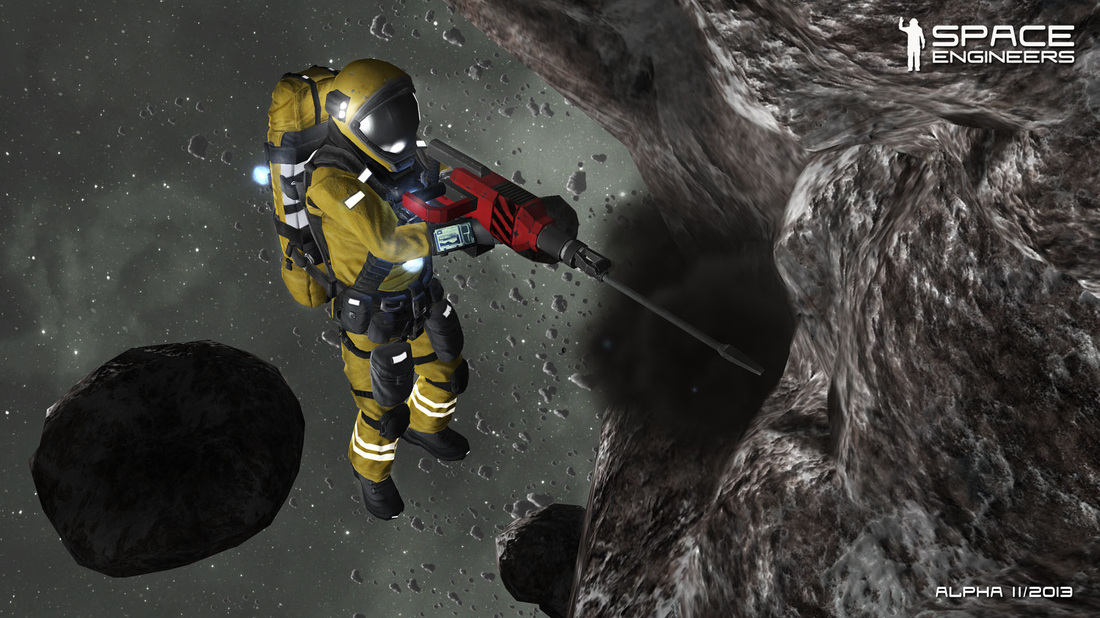
An astronaut mining an asteroid in the video game Space Engineers

== In fiction ==
The first mention of asteroid mining in science fiction is regarded to be Garrett P. Serviss' story Edison's Conquest of Mars, published in the New York Evening Journal in 1898. Several science-fiction video games include asteroid mining.

== Gallery ==
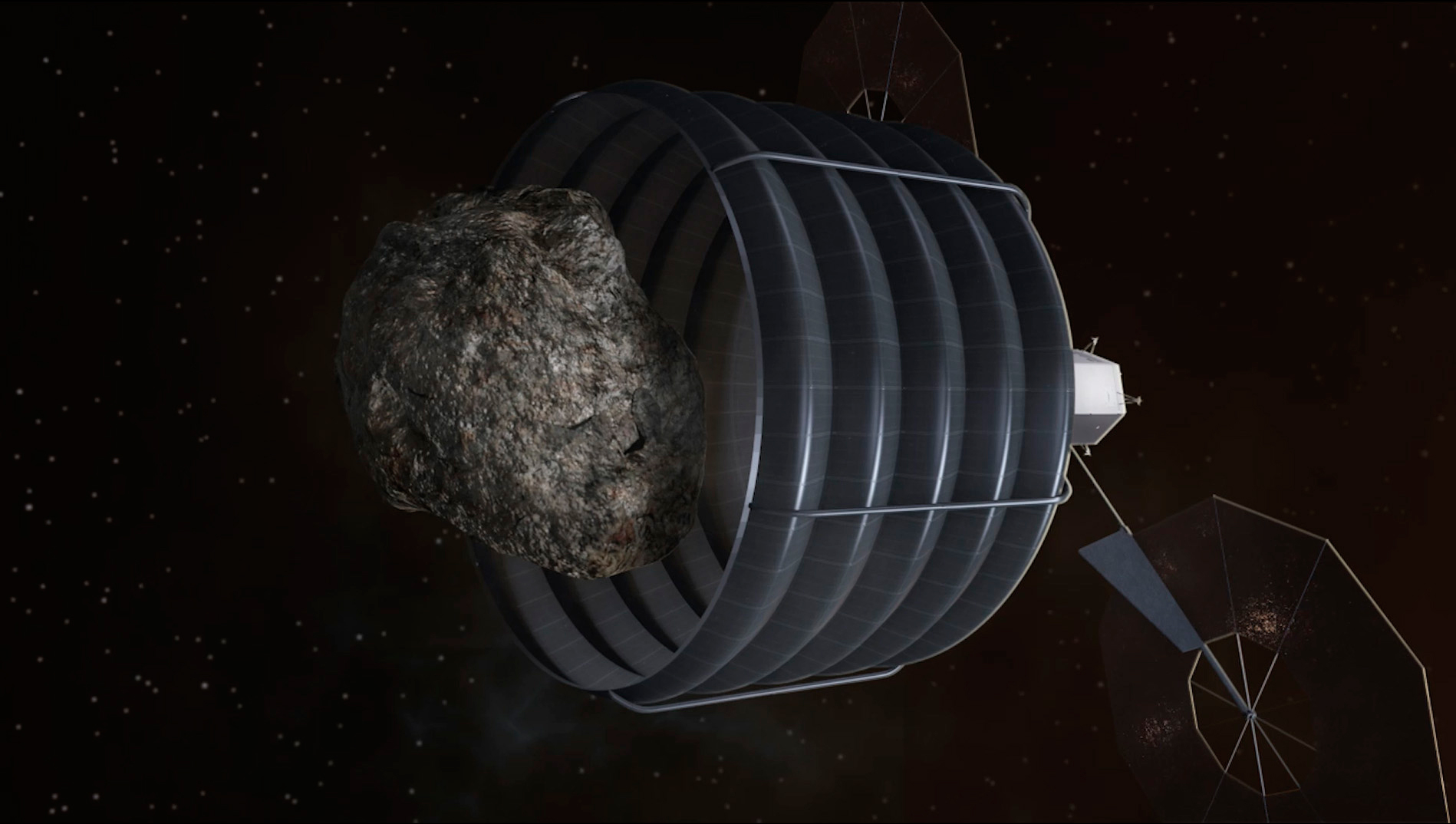
Illustration of proposed asteroid capture by Keck Institute for Space Studies made for Asteroid Redirect Mission

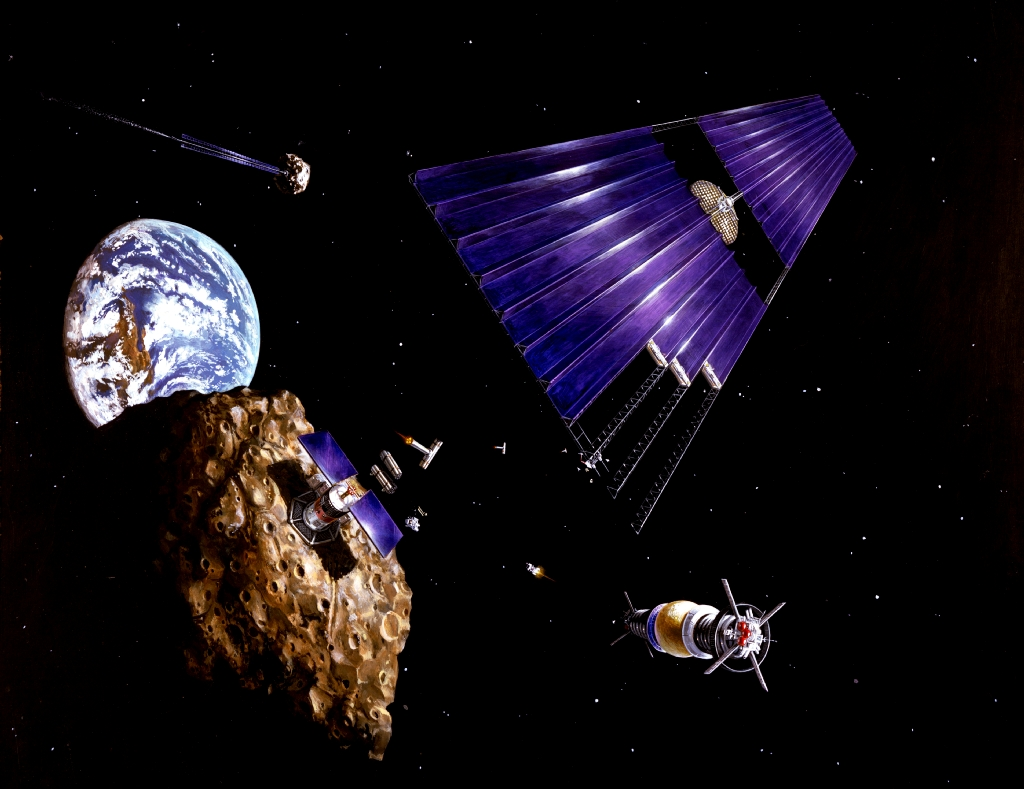
Artist's concept from the 1970s of asteroid mining

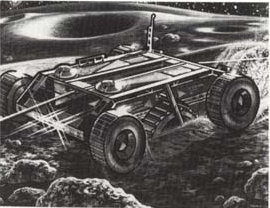
Artist's concept of an asteroid mining vehicle as seen in 1984

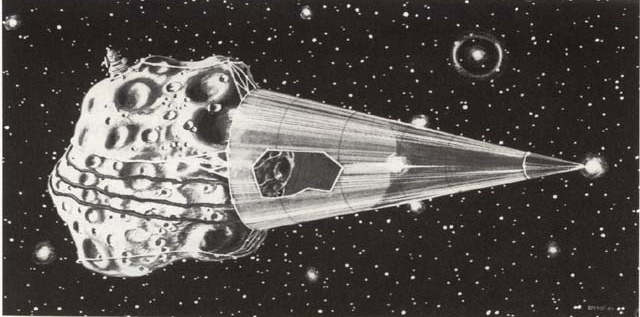
Artist's concept of an asteroid moved by a space tether

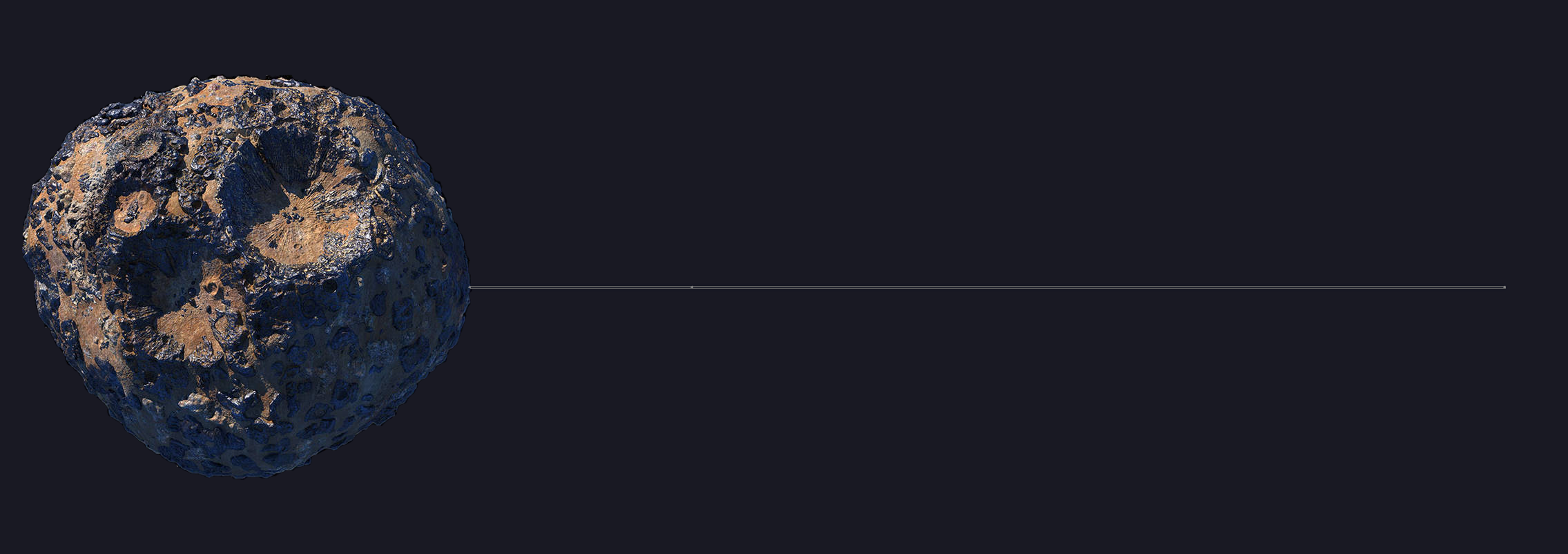
16 Psyche space elevator concept
The surface gravity is less than 2% of Earth's at ~0.144 m/s^{2}

== See also ==
- Asteroid belt
- Asteroid capture
- Asteroid Redirect Mission
- Atmospheric mining
- Gravity train / elevator
- In situ resource utilization
- Lunar resources
- Mining
- Mining the Sky: Untold Riches from the Asteroids, Comets, and Planets
- Near Earth Asteroid Prospector
- Sample-return mission
- Space manufacturing
- Space-based economy
- World Is Not Enough (spacecraft propulsion)
