= 16 Psyche =

Metallic main-belt asteroid

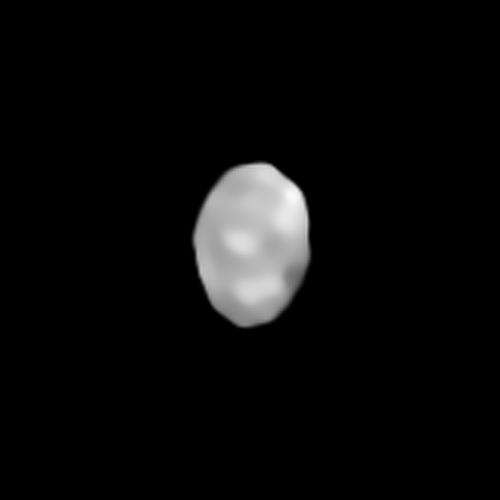
- 16 Psyche imaged by the Very Large Telescope's adaptive optics system in August 2019

Discovery
- Discovered by: Annibale de Gasparis
- Discovery site: Naples Observatory
- Discovery date: 17 March 1852

Designations
- Designation: (16) Psyche
- Pronunciation: /ˈsaɪkiː/
- Named after: Psyche (Ψυχή)
- Minor planet category: Main belt
- Adjectives: Psychean (/saɪˈkiːən/)
- Symbol: or (historical)

Orbital characteristics
- Epoch 21 November 2025 (JD 2461000.5)
- Aphelion: 3.32 AU (497 million km)
- Perihelion: 2.53 AU (378 million km)
- Semi-major axis: 2.92 AU (437 million km)
- Eccentricity: 0.1343
- Orbital period (sidereal): 4.998 yr (1825.6 d)
- Mean anomaly: 40.6°
- Inclination: 3.097°
- Longitude of ascending node: 150.0°
- Time of perihelion: 28 April 2025
- Argument of perihelion: 229.8°
- Earth MOID: 1.53 AU (229 million km)

Physical characteristics
- Dimensions: 278+8 −4 × 238+6 −4 × 171+5 −1 km
- Mean diameter: 222+4 −1 km
- Surface area: (1.62±0.05)×10^{5} km^{2}
- Volume: (5.75±0.19)×10^{6} km^{3}
- Mass: (2.395±0.020)×10^{19} kg (Note: Calculated from its standard gravitational parameter GM = 1.598585451±0.013305985 km^{3}/s^{2}.)
- Mean density: 4.165±0.142 g/cm^{3} (calculated)
- Surface gravity: ~0.144 m/s^{2}
- Escape velocity: ~180 m/s (~600 ft/s)
- Synodic rotation period: 4.195948±0.000001 h
- Axial tilt: 96°
- Pole ecliptic longitude: 36°±2°
- Pole ecliptic latitude: −8°±2°
- Albedo: 0.16±0.01 (visual); 0.34±0.08 (radar)
- Spectral type: Tholen = M SMASS = X Bus-DeMeo = Xk
- Apparent magnitude: 9.5 to 12.5
- Absolute magnitude (H): 5.90; 6.20

16 Psyche (/ˈsaɪkiː/ SY-kee) is a large M-type asteroid, which was discovered by the Italian astronomer Annibale de Gasparis, on 17 March 1852 and named after the Greek goddess Psyche.

The prefix "16" signifies that it was the sixteenth minor planet in order of discovery. It is the largest and most massive of the M-type asteroids, and one of the dozen most massive asteroids. This body has a mean diameter of approximately 222 kilometers (138 mi) and contains about one percent of the cumulative mass of the whole asteroid belt. It was thought to be the exposed core of a protoplanet, but observations reported in 2020 have cast doubt on that hypothesis.

Psyche will be explored by NASA, with a spacecraft of the same name, marking the first time a human-made object will journey to a metallic asteroid. The spacecraft was launched on 13 October 2023, with an expected arrival in 2029.

== Symbol ==
Insignia of the NASA Psyche mission

19th-century astronomers created iconic symbols for the first asteroids to be discovered, following the tradition of the classical planets. Psyche's symbol was a butterfly's wing topped by a star ( or), as the butterfly was the Greek symbol of the soul (psyche being the Greek word for both "butterfly" and "soul"). This symbol may have influenced the design of the official insignia for the NASA Psyche mission to this asteroid. It is encoded in Unicode as U+1CEC9 𜻉 PSYCHE.

However, the iconic symbols for all asteroids were superseded before Psyche's symbol came into widespread use. With more than a dozen asteroids discovered, the iconic symbols became increasingly cumbersome, and in 1851 German astronomer J.F. Encke suggested using a numbered disk instead. The first asteroid designated with the new scheme was Psyche in 1852, when American astronomer J. Ferguson published his observations and used ⑯ as Psyche's symbol.

== Orbit ==
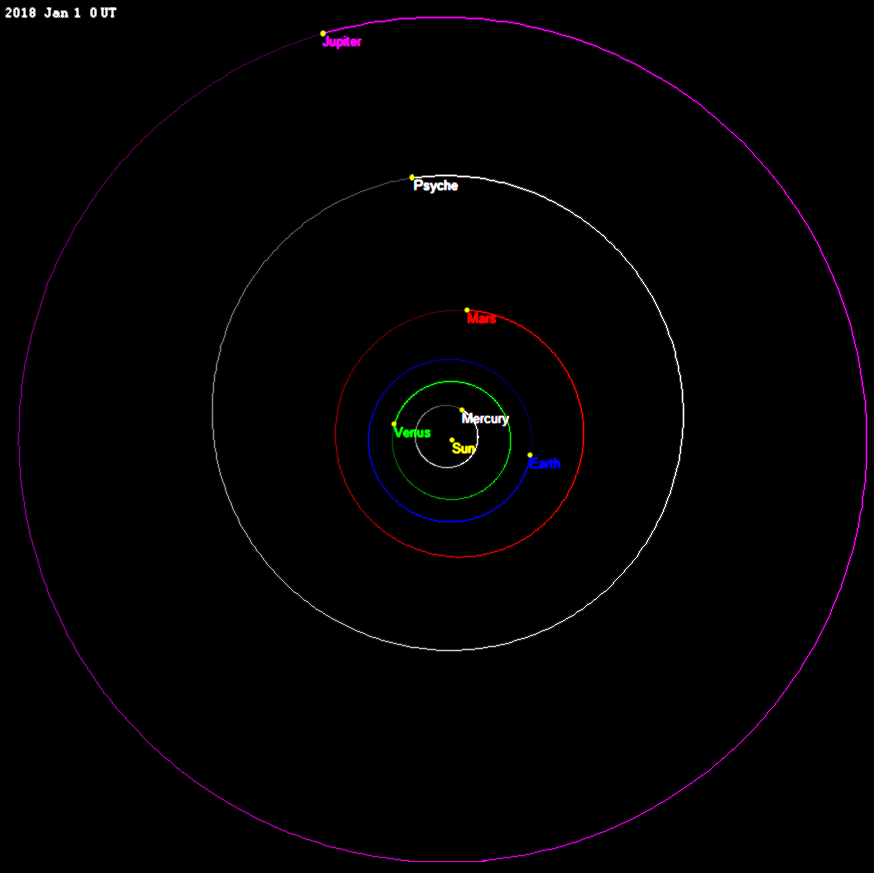
The orbit of Psyche, between Mars and Jupiter, with eccentricity of 0.134: higher than all of the major planets except Mercury, but typical for an asteroid.

Psyche is a main belt asteroid that orbits the Sun at a distance of 2.53–3.32 astronomical units (AU) with a semi-major axis or average orbital distance of 2.92 AU once every 4.998 years, (for reference, Ceres's orbit is at 2.77 AU).

Psyche's orbit has an eccentricity of 0.1343 and an inclination of 3.097° with respect to the ecliptic.

== Physical characteristics ==
=== Size ===
The first size estimate of Psyche was 253 kilometres (157 mi) and came from IRAS thermal infrared emission observations. This is 13.04% larger than the currently accepted mean value of 220 kilometres (140 mi), but was later found to be an accurate estimate for the IRAS viewing aspect because Psyche was viewed pole-on at the time of the measurement.

Psyche has been observed to occult a star on twelve occasions. Seven of these, 2004, 2010, 2014, and 2019, generated multi-chord data sets and have been used along with adaptive optics imaging and three-dimensional modeling to estimate Psyche's mean diameter, with recent models all converging to an equivalent-volume mean diameter of 222+4
−1 km..

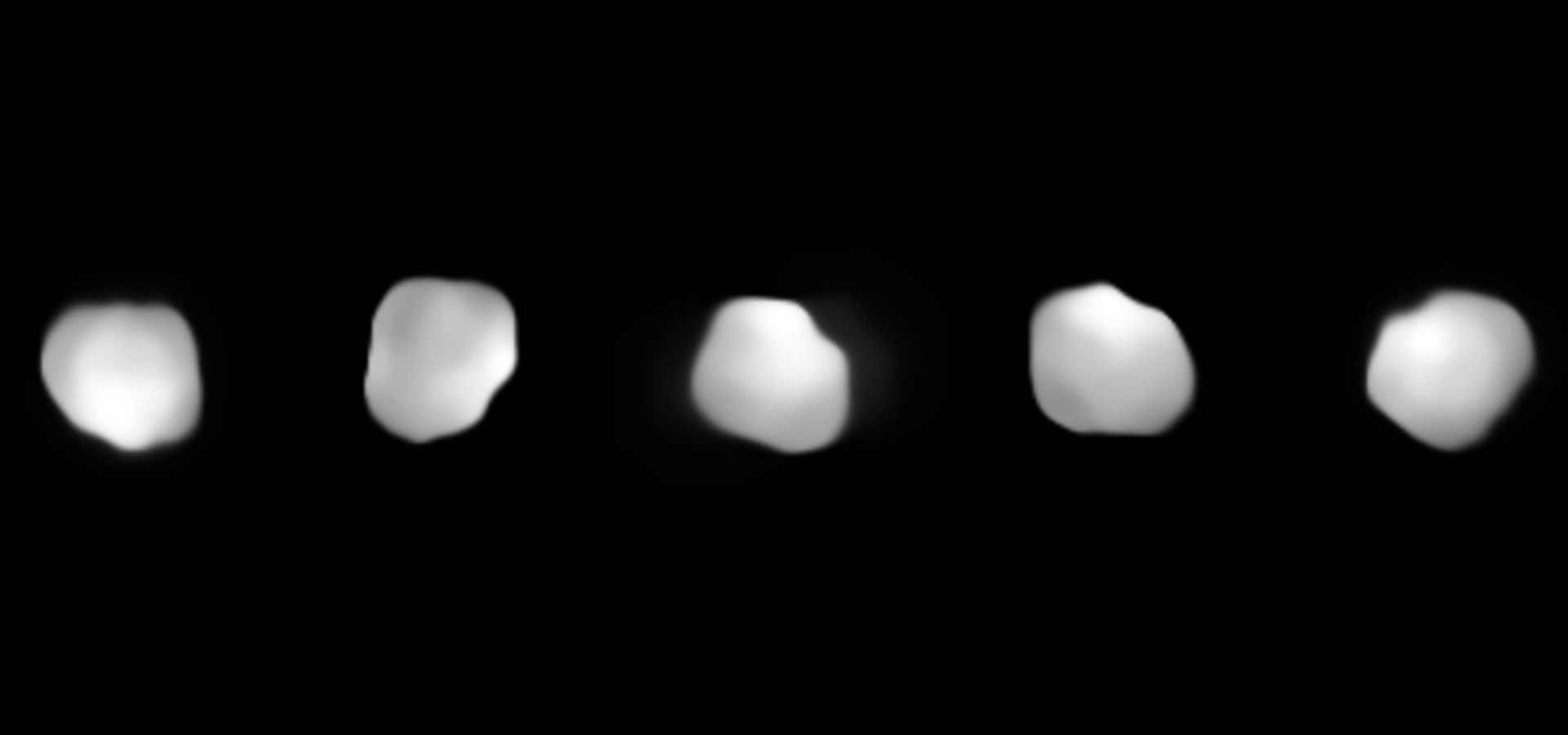
Multiple views of 16 Psyche imaged by the Very Large Telescope

=== Mass and bulk density ===
Psyche is massive enough that its gravity observably perturbs other asteroids' orbits, which can be used to calculate a mass estimate. Historical values for Psyche's mass have ranged from 1.6×10^{19} kg to 6.7×10^{19} kg. However, most recent estimates have begun to converge on values near (2.29±0.14)×10^{19} kg. The most recent estimate from Gaia data yields (2.395±0.020)×10^{19} kg. Assuming the mean volume of (5.75±0.19)×10^{6} km^{3}, this equates to a bulk density of 4.165±0.142 g/cm^{3}, which is considerably higher than most small Solar System bodies.

=== Shape and spin pole ===
The first published three-dimensional shape model for Psyche was derived from an analysis of numerous light curves. Since then, additional refinements to the shape have been made based on the inversion of lightcurves, adaptive optics observations, radar observations, thermal imaging, and occultations. The most recent models show that Psyche has a shape consistent with a Jacobi ellipsoid and dimensions within a few km of 278 km x 238 km x 171 km.

Each shape model provides an estimate of the direction of the north pole (spin axis). All recent models for Psyche suggest it rotates about a pole pointed towards the ecliptic coordinates (long, lat) λ = 36°, β = −8°, with a 2° uncertainty. This means that it is essentially tilted toward the ecliptic, with an axial tilt of 96°.

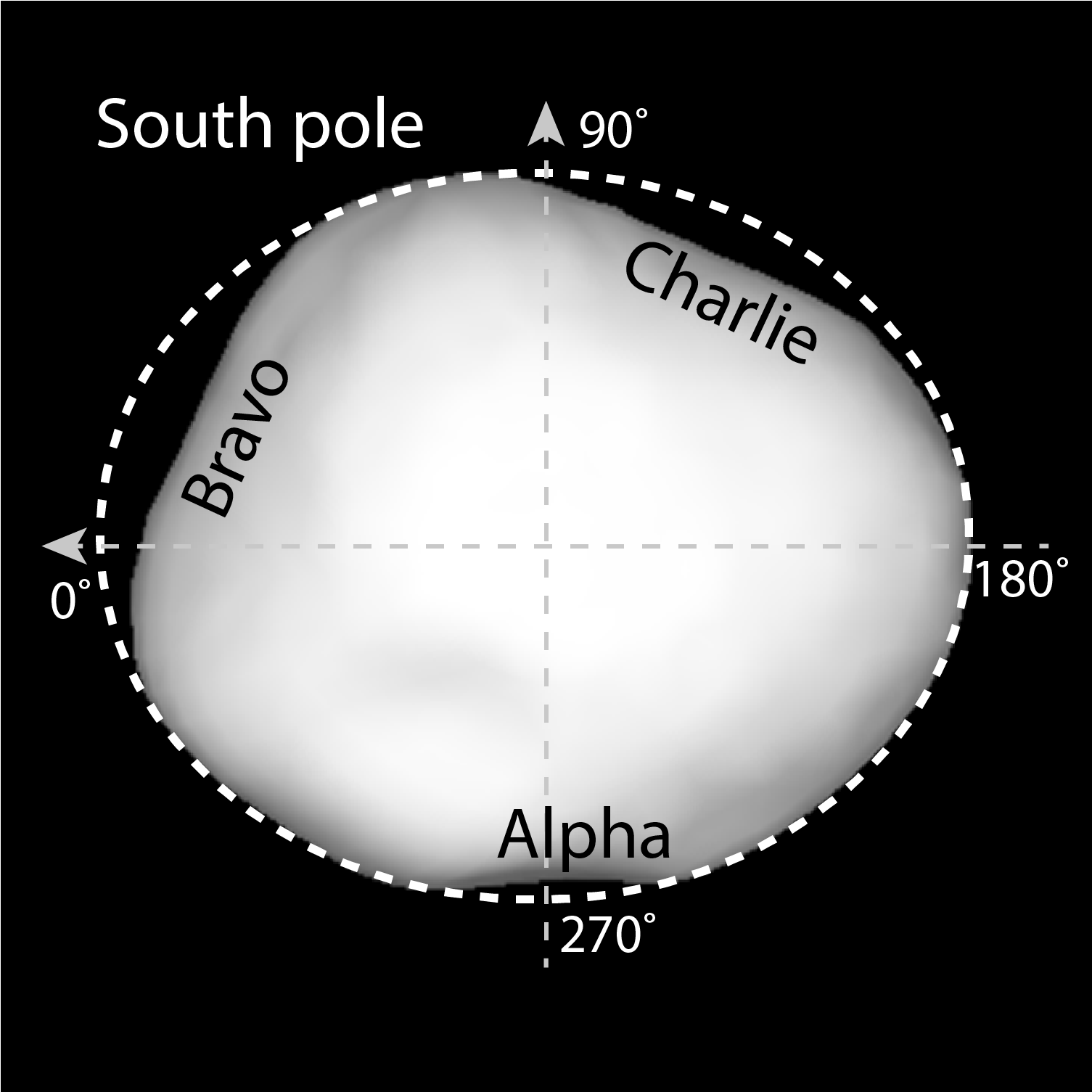
View of Psyche from its south pole with a best fit ellipsoid overlain. Major deviations from the ellipsoid shape are referred to as Alpha, Bravo, and Charlie.

Animation of a Psyche shape model viewed from 20° north latitude. The red peg is at 0° longitude.

Animation of a Psyche shape model viewed from 20° south latitude. The red peg is at 0° longitude.

=== Features ===
Illustration of Psyche commissioned by NASA

Many features have been reported on Psyche. The largest of these are regions of mass-deficits relative to its nominal ellipsoid shape and are reminiscent of the Rheasilvia basin on 4 Vesta.

In addition to the large-scale regions of mass-deficit, several apparent craters have been reported. Observers using the Very Large Telescope's adaptive optics SPHERE imager reported two large craters, on the order of 90 km across, which were provisionally named Meroe /ˈmɛroʊiː/ and Panthia /ˈpænθiə/, after the twin witches in the Roman novel Metamorphoses by Apuleius. Observers using the Arecibo Radar Telescope reported craters at the south pole (referred to as Delta), southern midlatitudes (referred to as Eros), and the north pole (referred to as Foxtrot). An analysis of the features present in several independent shape models suggests that craters Panthia and Eros are almost certainly real and Foxtrot is likely to be real. However, there is uncertainty over the existence of Meroe and Delta.

Early lightcurve studies suggested that Psyche has large variations in its surface brightness. These variations became more evident when attempts were made to invert lightcurves to generate shape models. The most recent shape models based on lightcurve inversions simultaneously solve for surface albedo variations, and the resulting maps show regions where local albedo differs from the mean albedo by more than 20% in either direction. Notably, the Meroe crater coincides with an area much darker than the mean, and the Panthia crater coincides with an area much brighter than the mean.

Radar observations with the Arecibo Radar Telescope revealed that Psyche's "background" radar albedo is $\hat{\sigma}_{OC}=0.26$, comparable to other M-type asteroids like 21 Lutetia. This value is consistent with a silicate (rocky) regolith enriched in metal phases. However, in at least three locations, Psyche's radar albedo is nearly twice this value, suggesting high concentrations of metal phases in these regions. One of these locations corresponds with the optically bright Panthia crater, while the other two correspond with regions that have been reported as optically bright. This apparent correlation between optical and radar albedos on Psyche has led to the hypothesis that there is a link between the process(es) that create regions of high metal content and brighter terrain.

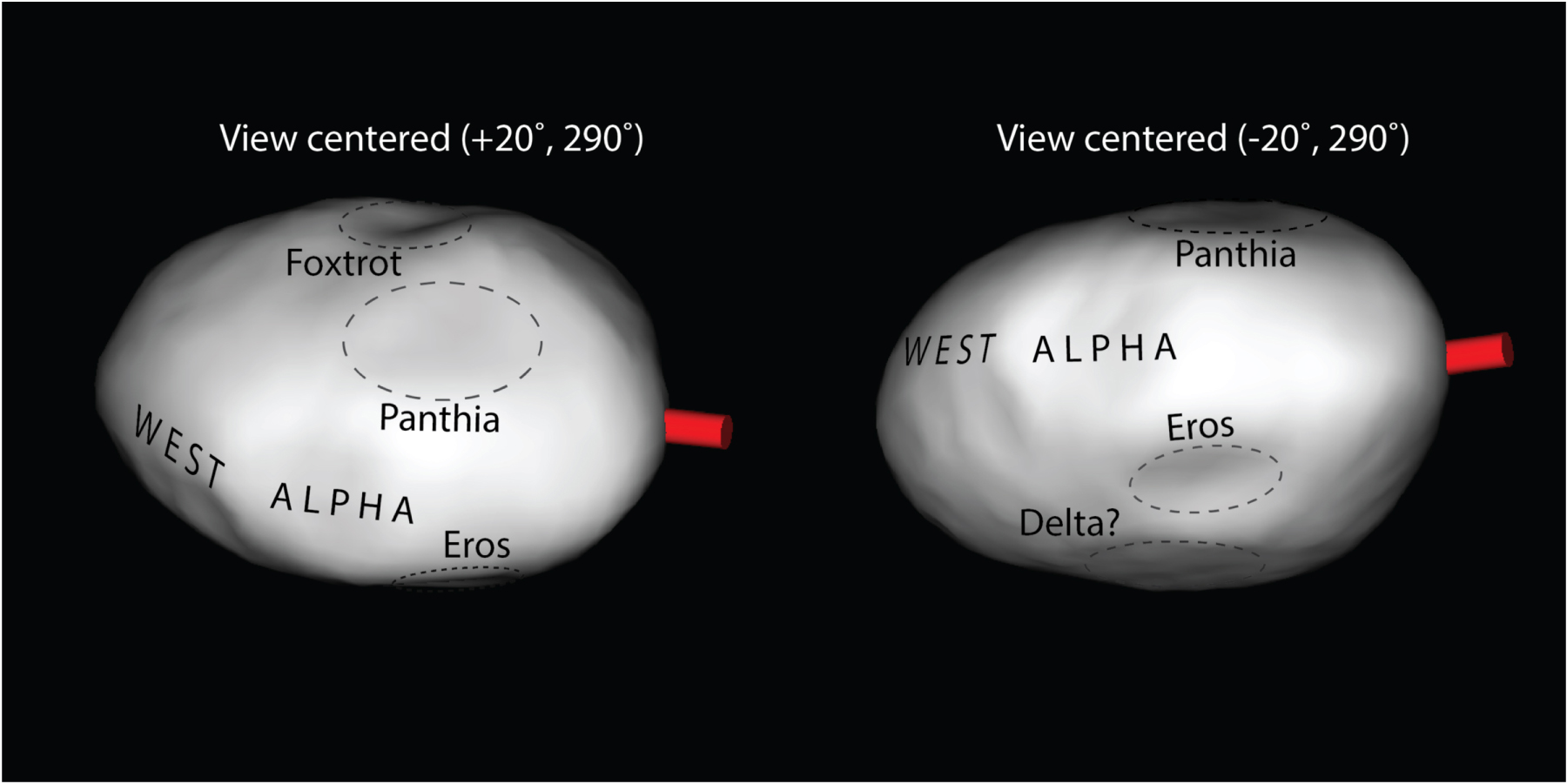
Shape model of asteroid 16 Psyche, with some of the observed surface features indicated.

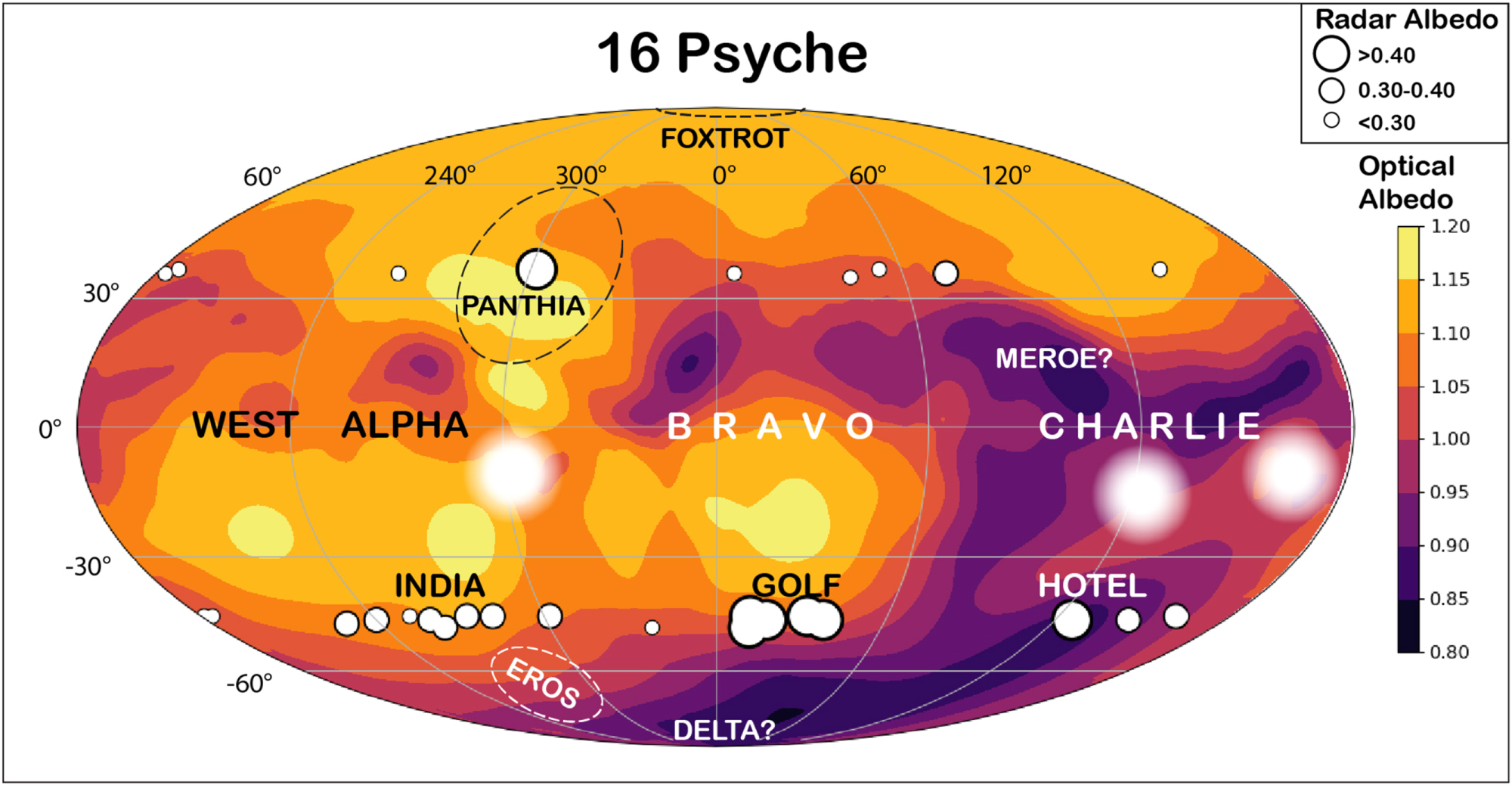
Optical albedo map of asteroid 16 Psyche with superimposed radar albedo measurements (circles).

=== Composition ===
The bulk density of Psyche (3.9±0.3 g/cm^{3}) places constraints on its overall composition. The iron-nickel found in most iron meteorites has a bulk density of 7.9 g/cm^{3}. If Psyche were the remnant core of an early planetesimal, it would have an overall porosity of 50%. Given Psyche's size, this is considered improbable. However, there are other metal-rich meteorite types that have been suggested as Psyche analogs, each of which have bulk densities that are similar to Psyche's, including enstatite chondrites, bencubbinites, and mesosiderites.

Several observers have reported the presence of silicate minerals on the surface of Psyche. Spectra taken in October 2016 at the NASA Infrared Telescope Facility at the Maunakea Observatories on Hawaii showed evidence (~3 μm absorption feature) of hydroxyl ions on the asteroid that may suggest the presence of hydrated silicates. Since Psyche is thought to have formed under dry conditions without the presence of water, the hydroxyl may have reached Psyche via past impacts from smaller carbonaceous asteroids.

Psyche's radar albedo varies considerably over the surface, ranging from 0.22 to 0.52, values that are two to four times as high as most main-belt asteroids. Models of radar reflection equate this range of values with regolith bulk densities of 2.6 to 4.7 g/cm^{3}. This range is consistent with most of the metal-rich meteorite classes noted above and the spectroscopic detection of silicate minerals. It is inconsistent with a pure iron-nickel regolith unless it is highly porous.

== Origin ==
Several possible origins have been proposed for Psyche. The earliest of these was that Psyche is an exposed metallic core resulting from a collision that stripped away the crust and mantle of an originally larger differentiated parent body some 500 kilometers in diameter. Other versions of this include the idea that it was not the result of a single large collision but multiple (more than three) relatively slow sideswipe collisions with bodies of comparable or larger size. However, this idea has fallen out of recent favor as mass and density estimates are inconsistent with a remnant core.

A second hypothesis is that Psyche was disrupted and gravitationally re-accreted into a mix of metal and silicate. In this case, it may be a candidate for the parent body of the mesosiderites, a class of stony–iron meteorites.

A third hypothesis is that Psyche may be a differentiated object, like 1 Ceres and 4 Vesta, but has experienced a type of iron volcanism, also known as ferrovolcanism, while still cooling. If true, this model predicts that metal would be highly enriched only in those regions containing (relic) volcanic centers. This view has been bolstered by recent radar observations.

== Exploration ==
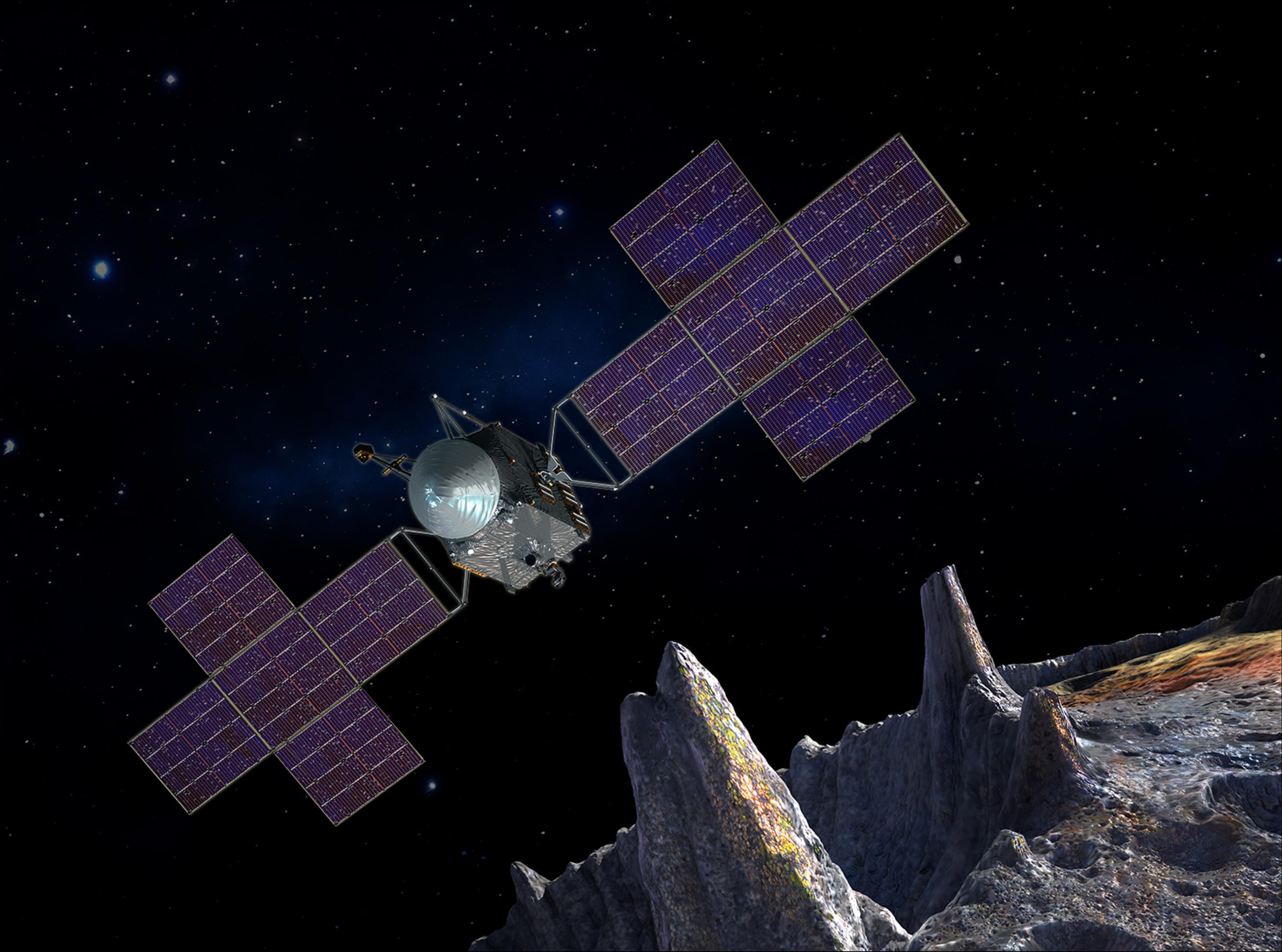
Artist's concept of the Psyche spacecraft orbiting asteroid Psyche

No spacecraft has visited Psyche, but a mission to Psyche was proposed to NASA in 2014. A team led by Lindy Elkins-Tanton, the director of the School for Earth and Space Exploration at Arizona State University, presented a concept for a robotic Psyche orbiter. This team argued that 16 Psyche would be a valuable object for study because it is the only metallic core-like body discovered so far.

The spacecraft would orbit Psyche for 20 months, studying its topography, surface features, gravity, magnetism, and other characteristics and would be based on current technology, avoiding high cost and the necessity to develop new technologies. On 30 September 2015, the Psyche orbiter mission was one of five Discovery Program semifinalist proposals.

The mission was approved by NASA on 4 January 2017 and was originally targeted to launch in October 2023, with an Earth gravity assist maneuver in 2024, a Mars flyby in 2025, and arriving at the asteroid in 2030. In May 2017, the launch date was moved up to target a more efficient trajectory, launching in 2022, with a Mars gravity assist in 2023 and arriving in 2026. However, problems with Psyche's flight software led NASA to revert to the original launch timeline.

On 28 February 2020, NASA awarded SpaceX a US$117 million contract to launch the Psyche spacecraft, and two smallsat secondary missions, on a Falcon Heavy rocket. The spacecraft was successfully launched on 13 October 2023, at 14:19 UTC, with an expected arrival in 2029.

Asteroid Psyche has an Earth-MOID of 1.5 AU (220 million km; 580 LD), and most recently came to opposition on 6 August 2024 when it was 1.7 AU (250 million km; 660 LD) from Earth.

== See also ==
- List of minor planets and comets visited by spacecraft
- List of missions to minor planets
- Asteroid mining
- Colonization of the asteroid belt
- Gravity elevator
