= Journal of Electrostatics =

Scientific journal on electrostatics

- Discipline: Electrostatics, electrohydrodynamics
- Language: English
- Edited by: Kazimierz Adamiak

Publication details
- History: 1975-present
- Publisher: Elsevier
- Frequency: Bimonthly
- Impact factor: 2.1 (2024)

Standard abbreviations
- ISO 4: J. Electrost.

Indexing
- CODEN: JOELDH
- ISSN: 0304-3886 (print); 1873-5738 (web)

Links
- Journal homepage; Online access; Online archive

The Journal of Electrostatics is a peer-reviewed scientific journal published monthly by Elsevier. Established in 1975, it covers developments in the science and engineering of electrostatics, including electrostatic charge separation processes, electrostatic manipulation of particles, electrohydrodynamics and electrostatics in the gas phase. Its current editor-in-chief is Kazimierz Adamiak (University of Western Ontario).

== Abstracting and indexing ==
The journal is abstracted and indexed in:

- Current Contents/Electronics & Telecommunications Collection
- Current Contents/Engineering, Computing & Technology
- EBSCO databases
- Ei Compendex
- Inspec
- Science Citation Index Expanded
- Scopus

According to the Journal Citation Reports, the journal has a 2024 impact factor of 2.1.
