= Colonization of the asteroid belt =

Proposed concepts for the human colonization of the asteroids

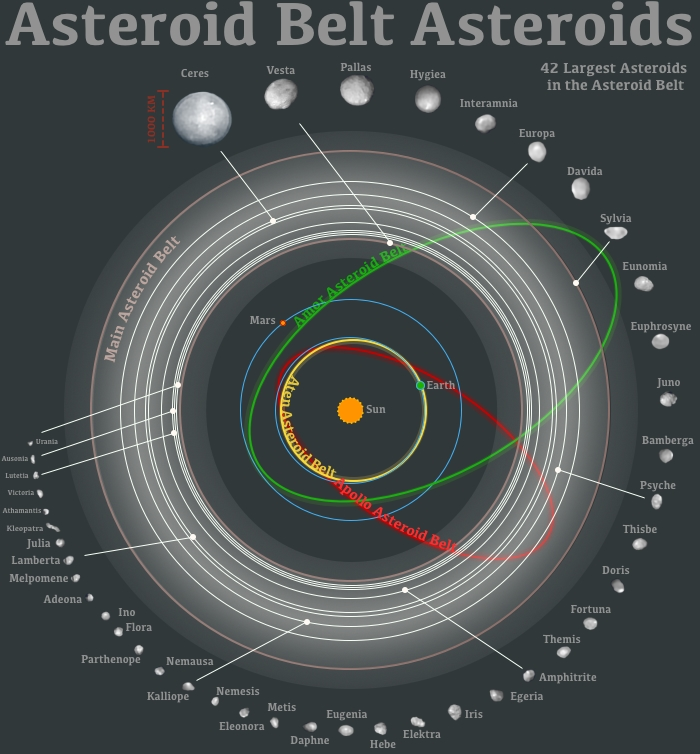
Main Asteroid belt 42 largest asteroids Amor asteroid belt Apollo asteroid belt Aten asteroid belt

Asteroids, including those in the asteroid belt, have been suggested as possible sites of space colonization. Motives include the survival of humanity, and the specific economic opportunity for asteroid mining. Obstacles include transportation distance, temperature, radiation, lack of gravity, and psychological issues.

Most asteroids have minerals that could be mined. Because these bodies do not have substantial gravity wells, only a low delta-V is needed to haul materials to a construction site. There is estimated to be enough material in the main asteroid belt alone to build enough space habitats to equal the habitable surface area of 3,000 Earths.

The asteroid belt has about 10^{18} metric tonnes of overall material available – ten thousand times more than is available in the near-Earth asteroids – but it is thinly distributed as it covers a vast region of space. The largest asteroid is Ceres, which at about 940 km in diameter is big enough to be a dwarf planet. The next two largest are Pallas and Vesta, both about 520 km in diameter. Uncrewed supply craft should be practical with little technological advance, even crossing 500 million kilometers of space. The colonists would have a strong interest in assuring their asteroid did not hit Earth or any other body of significant mass, but would have extreme difficulty in moving an asteroid of any size. The orbits of the Earth and most asteroids are very distant from each other in terms of delta-v and the asteroidal bodies have enormous momentum. Rockets or mass drivers can perhaps be installed on asteroids to direct their path into a safe course.

== Driving forces ==
One of the primary arguments for space colonization in general addresses ensuring the long-term survival of the human species. In the event of worldwide artificial or natural disaster a space colony would allow the human species to continue. Michael Griffin, the NASA administrator in 2006, stated the case as follows:

"... the goal isn't just scientific exploration ... it's also about extending the range of human habitat out from Earth into the solar system as we go forward in time ... In the long run a single-planet species will not survive ... If we humans want to survive for hundreds of thousands or millions of years, we must ultimately populate other planets."

One specific argument for asteroid colonization emphasises the potential economic gain from asteroid mining. Asteroids contain a significant amount of valuable materials, including rare minerals and precious metals, which could be mined and transported back to Earth for sale. With approximately as much iron as the world produces in 100,000 years, 16 Psyche is one such asteroid, worth approximately $10 quintillion in metallic iron and nickel. On October 10, 2023, NASA launched the Psyche orbiter, which should arrive by August 2029 to study the asteroid. 511 Davida could have $27 quadrillion worth of minerals and resources.

NASA estimates that between 1.1 and 1.9 million asteroids in the asteroid belt are larger than 1 kilometer in diameter. Millions are smaller. Approximately 8% of known main-belt asteroids are similar in composition to 16 Psyche. One company, Planetary Resources, is already aiming to develop technologies with the goal of using them to mine asteroids. Planetary Resources estimates some 30-meter long asteroids to contain as much as $25 to $50 billion worth of platinum.

== Transportation ==
Interplanetary spaceflight is a challenge because the asteroid belt is far, hundreds of millions of miles or km away. A human mission to Mars, tens of millions of miles or km, is similarly challenging. The Mars rover mission, for example, took 253 days to get to Mars. Russia, China, and the European Space Agency ran an experiment, called MARS-500, between 2007 and 2011 to gauge the physical and psychological limitations of crewed space flight. The experiment concluded that 18 months of solitude was the limit for a crewed space mission. With current technology the journey to the asteroid belt would be greater than 18 months, suggesting that a crewed mission may require overcoming this challenge.

== Landing ==
Asteroids are not large enough to produce significant gravity, making it difficult to land a spacecraft. Humans have yet to land a spacecraft on an asteroid in the asteroid belt, but uncrewed spacecraft have temporarily landed on a few asteroids, the first of which in 2001 was 433 Eros, a NEA from the Amor group, more recently 162173 Ryugu, another NEA of the Apollo group. This was part of the Hayabusa2 mission that was conducted by the Japanese Space Agency. The landing used four solar ionic thrusters and four reaction wheels for orientation control and orbit control of the spacecraft to land on Ryugu. These technologies may be applied to complete a successful similar landing in the asteroid belt.

=== Ceres ===
Ceres is a dwarf planet and the largest body in the asteroid belt. As it is cryovolcanic, it has potential for asteroid mining of resources for colonization. Its gravitational pull is stronger than other bodies in the asteroid belt, making surface colonization a more realistic possibility.

Ceres has readily available water, ammonia, and methane, important for survival, fuel, and possibly terraforming of Mars and Venus. The colony could be established on a surface crater or underground. However, even Ceres only manages a tiny surface gravity of 0.03g, which is not enough to stave off the negative effects of microgravity (though it does make transportation to and from Ceres easier). Either medical treatments or artificial gravity would thus be required. Additionally, colonizing the main asteroid belt would likely require infrastructure to already be present on the Moon and Mars.

Some have suggested that Ceres could act as a main base or hub for asteroid mining. However, Geoffrey A. Landis has pointed out that the asteroid belt is a poor place for an asteroid-mining base if more than one asteroid is to be exploited: the asteroids are not close to each other, and two asteroids chosen at random are quite likely to be on opposite sides from the Sun from each other. He suggests that it would be better to construct such a base on an inner planet, such as Venus: inner planets have higher orbital velocities, making the transfer time to any specific asteroid shorter, and orbit the Sun faster, so that the launch windows to the asteroid are more frequent (a lower synodic period). Thus Venus is closer to the asteroids than Earth or Mars in terms of flight time. Transfer times for the journeys Venus–Ceres and Venus–Vesta are 1.15 and 0.95 years respectively along minimum-energy trajectories, which is shorter even than Earth–Ceres and Earth–Vesta at 1.29 and 1.08 years respectively.

=== Mining the Asteroid Belt from Mars ===
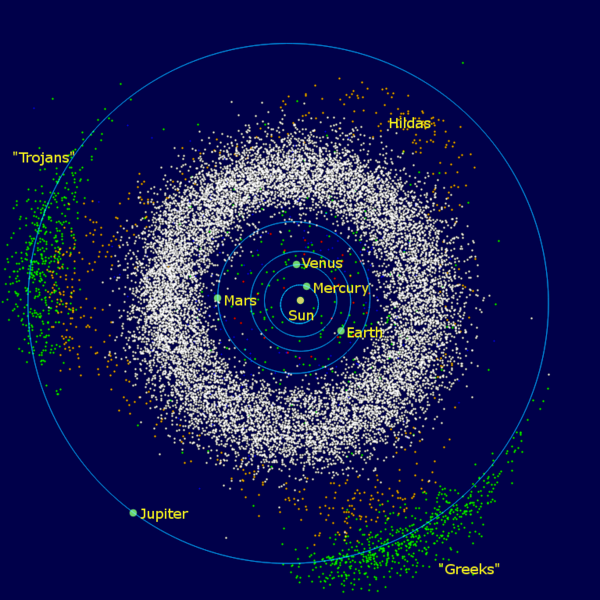
The asteroids of the inner Solar System and Jupiter: The belt is located between the orbits of Jupiter and Mars.: Sun; Jupiter trojans Orbits of planets / Asteroid belt Hilda asteroids (Hildas); Near-Earth objects (selection)

Anthony Taylor, Jonathan C. McDowell, and Martin Elvis suggest Mars' moon Phobos as an asteroid-belt mining hub. The moon provides a large platform and a mass for radiation shielding, and it is not far from Mars' surface. Hence, a Phobos base for asteroid mining works hand in hand economically with Mars settlement. The main belt is more accessible from Martian orbit than from low Earth orbit. Since Mars is much closer to the Asteroid belt than Earth is, it would take less Delta-v to get to the Asteroid belt and return minerals to Mars.

One hypothesis is that the origin of the Moons of Mars (Phobos and Deimos) are actually Asteroid captures from the Asteroid belt. Using the moon Phobos to launch spacecraft is energetically favorable and a useful location from which to dispatch missions to main belt asteroids. Mining the asteroid belt from Mars and its moons could help in the Colonization of Mars.

A space elevator based on Phobos could reduce the cost of transport. See Colonization of Mars § Transportation.

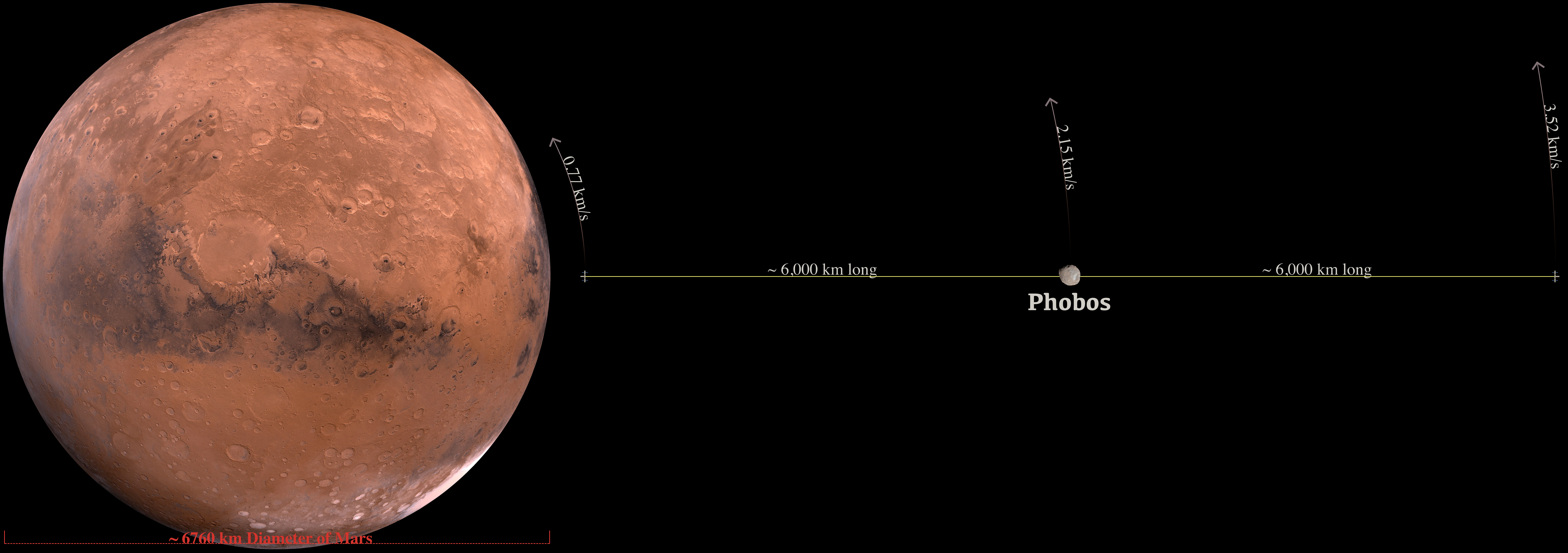
Space elevator Phobos

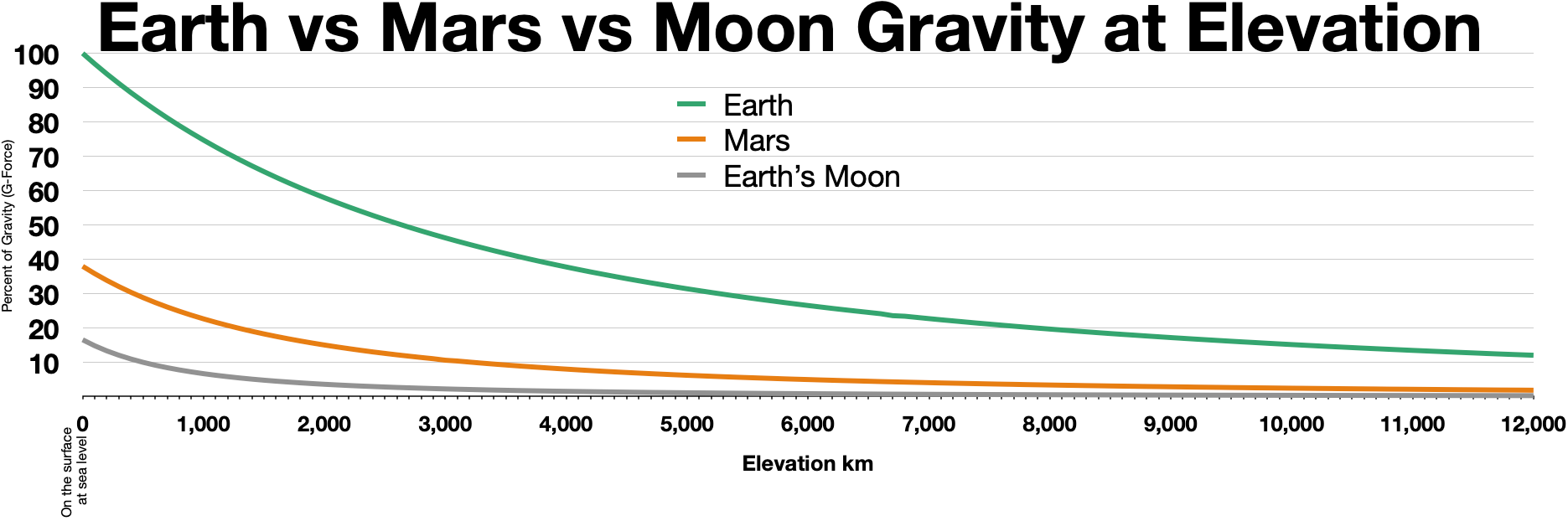
Earth vs Mars vs Moon gravity at elevation

== Challenges for human habitation ==
=== Gravity ===
Lack of gravity has many adverse effects on human biology. Transitioning gravity fields has the potential to impact spatial orientation, coordination, balance, locomotion, and induce motion sickness. Asteroids, without artificial gravity, have relatively little gravity in comparison to earth. Without gravity working on the human body, bones lose minerals, and bone density decreases by 1% monthly. In comparison, the rate of bone loss for the elderly is between 1–1.5% yearly. The excretion of calcium from bones in low gravity makes higher risk of kidney stones. Additionally, fluids in the body shift towards the head, possibly causing pressure in the head and vision problems.

Overall physical fitness tends to decrease as well, and proper nutrition becomes much more important. Without gravity, muscles are engaged less and overall movement is easier. Without intentional training, muscle mass, cardiovascular conditioning and endurance will decrease.

==== Artificial gravity ====
Artificial gravity offers a solution to the adverse effects of zero gravity on the human body. One possibility, investigated in a study conducted by researchers at the University of Vienna, involves hollowing out and rotating a celestial body. Colonists would then live within the asteroid, and the centrifugal force would simulate Earth's gravity. The researchers found that while it may be unclear as to whether asteroids would be strong enough to maintain the necessary spin rate, they could not rule out such a project if the dimensions and composition of the asteroid were within acceptable levels.

Currently, there are no practical large-scale applications of artificial gravity for spaceflight or colonization efforts due to issues with size and cost. However, a variety of research labs and organizations have performed a number of tests utilizing human centrifuges to study the effects of prolonged sustained or intermittent artificial gravity on the body in an attempt to determine feasibility for future missions such as long-term spaceflight and space colonization. A research team at the University of Colorado Boulder found that they were able to make all participants in their study feel comfortable at approximately 17 revolutions per minute in a human centrifuge, without the motion sickness that tends to plague most trials of small-scale applications of artificial gravity. This offers an alternative method which may be more feasible considering the significantly reduced cost in comparison to larger structures.

=== Temperature ===
Most asteroids are located in the asteroid belt, between Mars and Jupiter. This is a cold region, with temperatures ranging from –73 °C to –103 °C. Human life will require a consistent energy source for warmth.

=== Radiation ===
In space, cosmic rays and solar flares create a lethal radiation environment. Cosmic radiation has the potential to increase risk of heart disease, cancer, central nervous system disorder, and acute radiation syndrome. On Earth, life is protected by a magnetic field and its atmosphere, but asteroids lack this defense.

One possibility for defense against this radiation is living inside of an asteroid. It is estimated that humans would be sufficiently protected from radiation by burrowing 100 meters deep inside of an asteroid. However, the composition of asteroids creates an issue for this solution. Many asteroids are loosely organized rubble piles with very little structural integrity.

=== Psychology ===
Space travel has a huge impact on human psychology, including changes to brain structure, neural interconnectivity, and behavior.

Cosmic radiation has the ability to impact the brain, and has been studied extensively on rats and mice. These studies show the animals suffer from decreases in spatial memory, neural interconnectivity, and memory. Additionally, the animals had an increase in anxiety and fear.

The isolation of space and difficulty sleeping in the environment also contribute to psychological impacts. The difficulty of speaking with those on Earth can contribute to loneliness, anxiety, and depression. A Russian study simulated the psychological impacts of extended space travel. Six healthy males from various countries but with similar educational backgrounds to astronauts lived inside an enclosed module for 520 days in 2010–11. The members of the survey reported symptoms of moderate depression, abnormal sleep cycles, insomnia, and physical exhaustion.

In addition, NASA reports that missions on the global scale have ended or been halted due to mental issues. Some of these issues include shared mental delusions, depression, and becoming distressed from failed experiments.

However, in many astronauts, space travel can actually have a positive mental impact. Many astronauts report an increase of appreciation for the planet, purpose, and spirituality. This mainly results from the view of Earth from space.

== See also ==
- 16 Psyche
- Exploration of 16 Psyche – mission launched 2023 for 2029 arrival
- Colonization of Mars
- Asteroid mining
- Mining the asteroid belt from Mars
- Space colonization
- Asteroid belt
- Space habitat
- Gravity train
- Space elevator
- Orbital ring
