= Atmospheric mining =

Mining technique

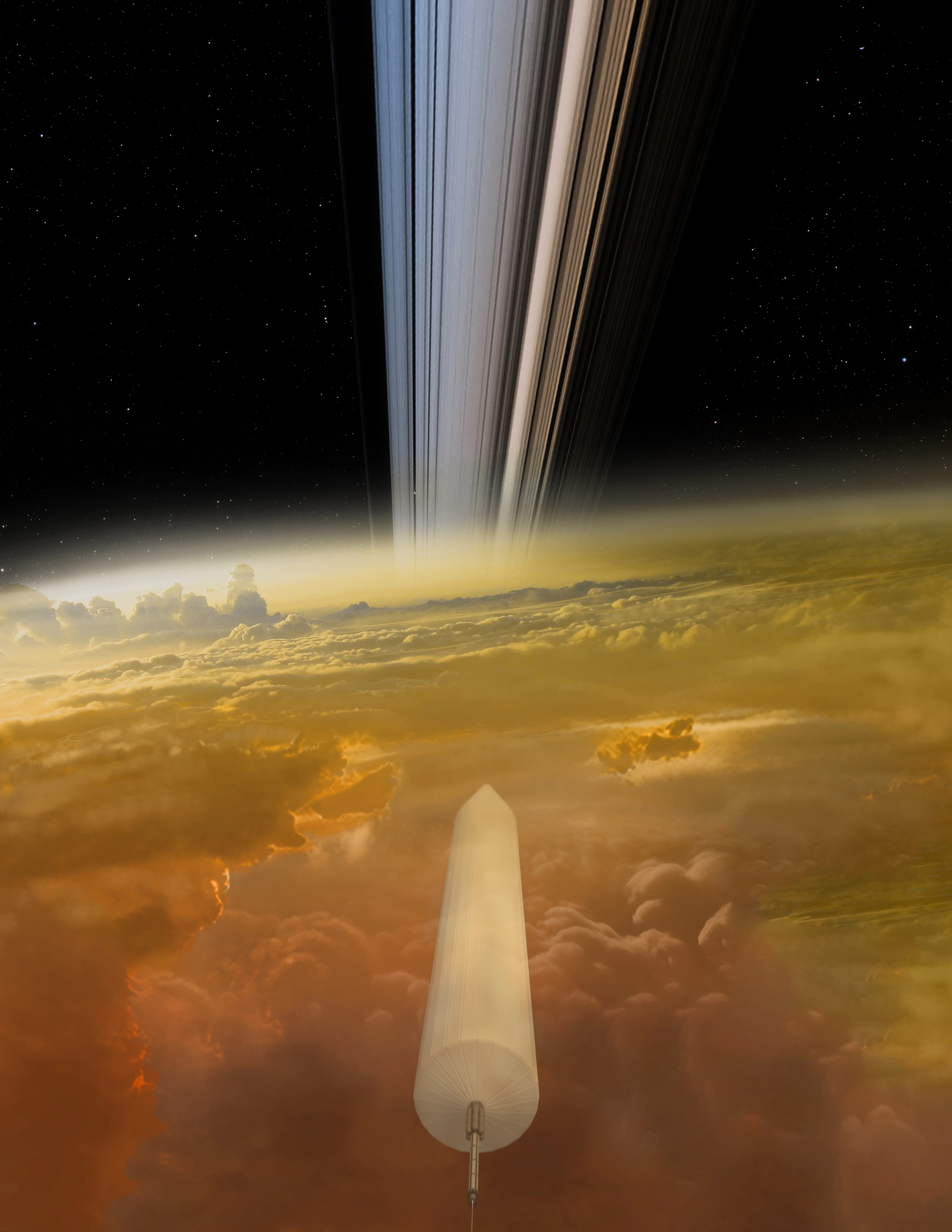
3D sketch of a Saturn liquid hydrogen tanker

Atmospheric mining is the process of extracting valuable materials or other non-renewable resources from the atmosphere. Due to the abundance of molecular hydrogen and helium in the outer planets of the Solar System, advances in technology may eventually make mining their atmospheres a favorable alternative to mining terrestrial surfaces.

== Feasibility of atmospheric mining ==
While atmospheric mining of outer planets has not yet begun and would be difficult with current technology, there is some consensus that the technical challenges are not insurmountable. Excluding the sun, the reserves of hydrogen and helium in particular of any one of the outer planets is orders of magnitude greater than all other known celestial bodies in the Solar System combined. Thus, if and when atmospheric mining becomes feasible, the potential benefits could be enormous.

The primary technological barrier preventing extraterrestrial atmospheric mining from being feasible is the current lack of fusion power. If and when this challenge is overcome, the atmospheres of the outer planets contain plentiful reserves of fuel and would ensure such mining would deliver an energy return many orders of magnitude more than the energy needed to extract such resources. Of the outer planets, Uranus and Neptune would be the easiest planets to mine for gas due to their smaller gravity well. Jupiter and Saturn are closer with respect to Earth, but Jupiter has a lot of gravity and a powerful magnetosphere to contend with, and it could be difficult navigating through the rings of Saturn. However, Uranus is likely the planet where atmospheric mining is most suitable. This is due to extremely high wind speeds on Jupiter, Saturn and Neptune, which could potentially damage or destroy any mining missions. Uranus, though also having high wind speeds, has a much more moderate climate.

With respect to Earth's atmosphere, the most prevalent proposal is that it could be mined for carbon dioxide to produce fuel and/or other carbon-based products such as plastics. A major advantage primarily relevant to the production of durable materials is that their production in sufficient quantity would cause a long term reduction in the level of greenhouse gas in the atmosphere. The disadvantage of such a scheme is that it would require a constant source of energy. The energy needed to make plastics, etc. from atmospheric carbon dioxide is many times the energy needed to make the same materials from fossil fuel sources, and any fuel produced would only contain a fraction of the energy required to produce it. However if and when a plentiful and clean energy source (most likely fusion power) becomes economically viable, such a project could become commercially feasible and would likely have the support of policy makers due to the long term environmental benefits of removing anthropogenic carbon dioxide from the terrestrial atmosphere.

== Types of atmospheric mining ==
=== Hydrogen mining ===
Hydrogen may fuel chemical and nuclear propulsion and be used as a propellant in ion thrusters.

=== Helium mining ===
Helium-3 may fuel nuclear propulsion.

=== Methane mining ===
Methane may fuel chemical propulsion.

=== Carbon dioxide mining ===
Carbon dioxide mining on Earth will reduce the level of greenhouse gases and can also produce fuel. The carbon extracted could be used to produce other materials such as plastics, which unlike fuel would have much greater potential to keep the carbon from returning to the atmosphere especially if the final products were intended to be durable and for long-term use.

Carbon dioxide can be removed from the atmosphere as a byproduct of industrial cryogenic air separation processes manufacturing products such as liquid nitrogen and liquid oxygen, but as this is a very energy intensive process, without access to fusion power mining specifically for carbon dioxide by this method is not economically viable. Carbon dioxide can also be removed from the atmosphere in some quantity by cultivating fast-growing plants such as bamboo, although this requires committing arable land that might otherwise be used for growing other crops.

== Exploration for atmospheric mining ==
Hydrogen and helium are abundant in outer planets.

Atmospheric composition of outer planets
Resource	Jupiter	Saturn	Uranus	Neptune
Hydrogen	89.8	96.3	82.5	80.0
Helium	10.2	3.3	15.2	19.0
Methane			2.3	1.0
Other		0.4	1.0	

== Methods of atmospheric mining ==
Various methods have been proposed to extract resources from the atmospheres of the giant planets. Due to the inherent risks in travelling into the atmosphere of a giant planet, most such proposals involve sending only robotic craft into the atmosphere, with any human presence limited to space stations based on one of the planet's moons and/or orbiting at a safe distance.

=== Aerostats ===
An aerostat would be a buoyant station in the atmosphere that gathers and stores gases. A vehicle would transfer the gases from the aerostat to an orbital station above the planet.

=== Scoopers ===
A scooper would be a vehicle that gathers and transfers gases from the atmosphere to an orbital station.

=== Skyhook ===
A Skyhook (structure) is similar to a space elevator, such a device would be used to pump gas to an orbital propellant depot.

=== Cruisers ===
A cruiser would be a vehicle in the atmosphere that gathers and stores gases. A smaller vehicle would transfer the gases from the cruiser to an orbital station.

== See also ==
- In-situ resource utilization
