= Electrostatic separator =

Device for separating particles by mass

Electrostatic Separator

An electrostatic separator is a device for separating particles by mass in a low energy charged beam.

An example is the electrostatic precipitator used in coal-fired power plants to treat exhaust gas, removing small particles that cause air pollution.

Electrostatic separation is a process that uses electrostatic charges to separate crushed particles of material. An industrial process used to separate large amounts of material particles, electrostatic separating is most often used in the process of sorting mineral ore. This process can help remove valuable material from ore, or it can help remove foreign material to purify a substance. In mining, the process of crushing mining ore into particles for the purpose of separating minerals is called beneficiation.

Generally, electrostatic charges are used to attract or repel differently charged material. When electrostatic separation uses the force of attraction to sort particles, conducting particles stick to an oppositely charged object, such as a metal drum, thereby separating them from the particle mixture. When this type of beneficiation uses repelling force, it is normally employed to change the trajectory of falling objects to sort them into different places. This way, when a mixture of particles falls past a repelling object, the particles with the correct charge fall away from the other particles when they are repelled by the similarly charged object.

An electric charge can be positive or negative — objects with a positive charge repel other positively charged objects, thereby causing them to push away from each other, while a positively charged object would attract to a negatively charged object, thereby causing the two to draw together.

Experiments showing electrostatic sorting in action can help make the process more clear. To exhibit electrostatic separation at home, an experiment can be conducted using peanuts that are still in their shells. When the shells are rubbed off of the peanuts and gently smashed into pieces, an electrostatically charged device, like a comb rubbed quickly against a wool sweater, will pick up the peanut shells with static electricity. The lightweight crushed shells that are oppositely charged from the comb easily move away from the edible peanut parts when the comb is passed nearby.

The electrostatic separation of conductors is one method of beneficiation; another common beneficiation method is magnetic beneficiation. Electrostatic separation is a preferred sorting method when dealing with separating conductors from electrostatic separation non-conductors. In a similar way to that in which electrostatic separation sorts particles with different electrostatic charges magnetic beneficiation sorts particles that respond to a magnetic field. Electrostatic beneficiation is effective for removing particulate matter, such as ash from mined coal, while magnetic separation functions well for removing the magnetic iron ore from deposits of clay in the earth.
