= List of minor planets: 636001–637000 =

The following is a partial list of minor planets, running from minor-planet number 636001 through 637000, inclusive. The primary data for this and other partial lists is based on JPL's "Small-Body Orbital Elements" and data available from the Minor Planet Center. Critical list information is also provided by the MPC, unless otherwise specified from Lowell Observatory. A detailed description of the table's columns and additional sources are given on the main page including a complete list of every page in this series, and a statistical break-up on the dynamical classification of minor planets.

Also see the summary list of all named bodies in numerical and alphabetical order, and the corresponding naming citations for the number range of this particular list. New namings may only be added to this list after official publication, as the preannouncement of names is condemned by the Working Group for Small Bodies Nomenclature of the International Astronomical Union.

Near-Earth obj.	MBA (inner)	MBA (outer)	Centaur
Mars-crosser	MBA (middle)	Jupiter trojan	Trans-Neptunian obj.
Unclassified

== 636001–636100 ==
Designation			Discovery			Properties		Ref
Permanent	Provisional	Named after	Date	Site	Discoverer(s)	Category	Diam.	Ref
636001	2014 KP_{94}	—	January 15, 2013	ESA OGS	ESA OGS	·	1.4 km	MPC · JPL
636002	2014 KA_{104}	—	September 10, 2007	Mount Lemmon	Mount Lemmon Survey	·	990 m	MPC · JPL
636003	2014 KL_{104}	—	May 22, 2014	Mount Lemmon	Mount Lemmon Survey	·	1.2 km	MPC · JPL
636004	2014 KM_{104}	—	May 26, 2006	Mount Lemmon	Mount Lemmon Survey	·	1.2 km	MPC · JPL
636005	2014 KB_{106}	—	May 25, 2014	Haleakala	Pan-STARRS 1	EUN	1.1 km	MPC · JPL
636006	2014 KO_{106}	—	April 2, 2005	Mount Lemmon	Mount Lemmon Survey	MIS	1.8 km	MPC · JPL
636007	2014 KZ_{107}	—	May 21, 2014	Haleakala	Pan-STARRS 1	·	980 m	MPC · JPL
636008	2014 KW_{111}	—	May 27, 2014	Haleakala	Pan-STARRS 1	·	1.2 km	MPC · JPL
636009	2014 KT_{134}	—	May 28, 2014	Mount Lemmon	Mount Lemmon Survey	·	1.3 km	MPC · JPL
636010	2014 KM_{142}	—	December 22, 2008	Kitt Peak	Spacewatch	·	1.2 km	MPC · JPL
636011	2014 LJ_{1}	—	October 2, 2010	Mount Lemmon	Mount Lemmon Survey	·	3.6 km	MPC · JPL
636012	2014 LT_{3}	—	February 1, 2009	Kitt Peak	Spacewatch	·	1.2 km	MPC · JPL
636013	2014 LU_{3}	—	October 12, 2007	Mount Lemmon	Mount Lemmon Survey	·	1.2 km	MPC · JPL
636014	2014 LJ_{5}	—	February 1, 2009	Mount Lemmon	Mount Lemmon Survey	·	1.2 km	MPC · JPL
636015	2014 LX_{7}	—	May 9, 2006	Mount Lemmon	Mount Lemmon Survey	·	890 m	MPC · JPL
636016	2014 LO_{12}	—	September 1, 2002	Palomar	NEAT	BRG	2.3 km	MPC · JPL
636017	2014 LM_{13}	—	May 30, 2014	Mount Lemmon	Mount Lemmon Survey	EUN	860 m	MPC · JPL
636018	2014 LY_{14}	—	November 12, 2007	Mount Lemmon	Mount Lemmon Survey	·	1.3 km	MPC · JPL
636019	2014 LM_{18}	—	August 30, 1998	Kitt Peak	Spacewatch	(5)	1.2 km	MPC · JPL
636020	2014 LM_{19}	—	August 29, 2001	Ondřejov	M. Wolf, L. Kotková	MRX	1.2 km	MPC · JPL
636021	2014 LQ_{32}	—	April 10, 2013	Haleakala	Pan-STARRS 1	·	1.6 km	MPC · JPL
636022	2014 LS_{32}	—	June 3, 2014	Haleakala	Pan-STARRS 1	EOS	1.9 km	MPC · JPL
636023	2014 LK_{38}	—	June 4, 2014	Haleakala	Pan-STARRS 1	·	1.1 km	MPC · JPL
636024	2014 LG_{40}	—	June 5, 2014	Haleakala	Pan-STARRS 1	·	1.1 km	MPC · JPL
636025	2014 MN	—	April 9, 2014	Haleakala	Pan-STARRS 1	H	630 m	MPC · JPL
636026	2014 MB_{2}	—	May 4, 2006	Mount Lemmon	Mount Lemmon Survey	·	1.5 km	MPC · JPL
636027	2014 MA_{9}	—	November 11, 2006	Mount Lemmon	Mount Lemmon Survey	·	1.8 km	MPC · JPL
636028	2014 MT_{12}	—	October 22, 2006	Mount Lemmon	Mount Lemmon Survey	·	1.3 km	MPC · JPL
636029	2014 MW_{15}	—	January 16, 2009	Mount Lemmon	Mount Lemmon Survey	·	1.1 km	MPC · JPL
636030	2014 MV_{19}	—	July 21, 2006	Mount Lemmon	Mount Lemmon Survey	·	1.0 km	MPC · JPL
636031	2014 MZ_{21}	—	February 15, 2013	Haleakala	Pan-STARRS 1	·	1.2 km	MPC · JPL
636032	2014 MQ_{22}	—	June 23, 2014	Mount Lemmon	Mount Lemmon Survey	·	1.4 km	MPC · JPL
636033	2014 MY_{22}	—	September 1, 2002	Palomar	NEAT	·	1.7 km	MPC · JPL
636034	2014 ME_{23}	—	May 5, 2014	Haleakala	Pan-STARRS 1	·	1.1 km	MPC · JPL
636035	2014 MP_{25}	—	September 25, 2000	Haleakala	NEAT	·	1.1 km	MPC · JPL
636036	2014 MP_{27}	—	January 16, 2013	Mount Lemmon	Mount Lemmon Survey	·	1.5 km	MPC · JPL
636037	2014 MH_{28}	—	September 23, 2011	Haleakala	Pan-STARRS 1	·	1.1 km	MPC · JPL
636038	2014 MX_{29}	—	June 3, 2014	Haleakala	Pan-STARRS 1	KON	1.9 km	MPC · JPL
636039	2014 ME_{30}	—	August 3, 2002	Palomar	NEAT	EUN	1.2 km	MPC · JPL
636040	2014 MM_{32}	—	January 29, 2009	Mount Lemmon	Mount Lemmon Survey	·	1.3 km	MPC · JPL
636041	2014 MA_{33}	—	June 25, 2014	Mount Lemmon	Mount Lemmon Survey	·	1.1 km	MPC · JPL
636042	2014 MA_{36}	—	June 5, 2010	Nogales	M. Schwartz, P. R. Holvorcem	·	1.7 km	MPC · JPL
636043	2014 MO_{37}	—	November 12, 2001	Apache Point	SDSS Collaboration	GEF	1.5 km	MPC · JPL
636044	2014 MQ_{39}	—	April 14, 2005	Catalina	CSS	·	1.2 km	MPC · JPL
636045	2014 MN_{44}	—	February 28, 2009	Mount Lemmon	Mount Lemmon Survey	·	1.5 km	MPC · JPL
636046	2014 MA_{47}	—	January 10, 2013	Haleakala	Pan-STARRS 1	MAR	760 m	MPC · JPL
636047	2014 MX_{47}	—	May 30, 2014	Haleakala	Pan-STARRS 1	·	1.1 km	MPC · JPL
636048	2014 MY_{48}	—	April 15, 2005	Kitt Peak	Spacewatch	·	1.5 km	MPC · JPL
636049	2014 MD_{52}	—	March 4, 2000	Apache Point	SDSS Collaboration	EUN	1.6 km	MPC · JPL
636050	2014 MX_{59}	—	September 26, 2006	Mount Lemmon	Mount Lemmon Survey	MAR	860 m	MPC · JPL
636051	2014 MZ_{71}	—	March 16, 2004	Campo Imperatore	CINEOS	·	1.7 km	MPC · JPL
636052	2014 MM_{73}	—	March 1, 2008	Kitt Peak	Spacewatch	AST	1.7 km	MPC · JPL
636053	2014 MM_{75}	—	April 1, 2005	Kitt Peak	Spacewatch	·	1.2 km	MPC · JPL
636054	2014 MT_{76}	—	June 28, 2014	Haleakala	Pan-STARRS 1	·	1.5 km	MPC · JPL
636055	2014 ML_{101}	—	June 27, 2014	Haleakala	Pan-STARRS 1	·	1.4 km	MPC · JPL
636056	2014 MZ_{104}	—	March 31, 2009	Kitt Peak	Spacewatch	·	1.0 km	MPC · JPL
636057	2014 NF_{6}	—	July 1, 2014	Haleakala	Pan-STARRS 1	(7744)	1.0 km	MPC · JPL
636058	2014 NK_{15}	—	March 6, 2013	Haleakala	Pan-STARRS 1	·	1.5 km	MPC · JPL
636059	2014 NB_{17}	—	May 25, 2006	Mount Lemmon	Mount Lemmon Survey	·	1.4 km	MPC · JPL
636060	2014 NV_{17}	—	March 19, 2001	Apache Point	SDSS	MAR	1.0 km	MPC · JPL
636061	2014 NC_{34}	—	June 26, 2014	ESA OGS	ESA OGS	·	2.2 km	MPC · JPL
636062	2014 NC_{36}	—	November 2, 2010	Mount Lemmon	Mount Lemmon Survey	·	1.8 km	MPC · JPL
636063	2014 NK_{43}	—	May 12, 2005	Palomar	NEAT	·	1.7 km	MPC · JPL
636064	2014 NQ_{44}	—	July 23, 2003	Palomar	NEAT	(31811)	4.2 km	MPC · JPL
636065	2014 NR_{44}	—	December 31, 2011	Mount Lemmon	Mount Lemmon Survey	·	2.0 km	MPC · JPL
636066	2014 NW_{47}	—	January 30, 2004	Kitt Peak	Spacewatch	·	1.6 km	MPC · JPL
636067	2014 NV_{53}	—	December 17, 2007	Kitt Peak	Spacewatch	·	1.1 km	MPC · JPL
636068	2014 NX_{53}	—	July 26, 2005	Palomar	NEAT	·	1.9 km	MPC · JPL
636069	2014 NT_{54}	—	December 13, 2006	Socorro	LINEAR	·	2.5 km	MPC · JPL
636070	2014 NT_{55}	—	June 26, 2014	Haleakala	Pan-STARRS 1	·	1.4 km	MPC · JPL
636071	2014 NV_{59}	—	February 10, 2004	Nogales	P. R. Holvorcem, M. Schwartz	·	1.9 km	MPC · JPL
636072	2014 NN_{61}	—	August 11, 2001	Palomar	NEAT	EUN	1.5 km	MPC · JPL
636073	2014 NR_{61}	—	October 10, 2004	Kitt Peak	Deep Ecliptic Survey	·	920 m	MPC · JPL
636074	2014 NL_{69}	—	November 30, 2010	Mount Lemmon	Mount Lemmon Survey	·	1.8 km	MPC · JPL
636075	2014 ND_{70}	—	March 21, 2009	Mount Lemmon	Mount Lemmon Survey	(5)	1.0 km	MPC · JPL
636076	2014 NL_{71}	—	February 25, 2007	Mount Lemmon	Mount Lemmon Survey	KOR	1.1 km	MPC · JPL
636077	2014 NS_{72}	—	April 17, 2013	Haleakala	Pan-STARRS 1	·	1.5 km	MPC · JPL
636078	2014 NE_{73}	—	July 7, 2014	Haleakala	Pan-STARRS 1	·	1.4 km	MPC · JPL
636079	2014 OW_{5}	—	July 31, 2005	Palomar	NEAT	·	2.1 km	MPC · JPL
636080	2014 OR_{9}	—	March 3, 2013	Mount Lemmon	Mount Lemmon Survey	·	950 m	MPC · JPL
636081	2014 OO_{22}	—	January 11, 2010	Kitt Peak	Spacewatch	T_{j} (2.99) · 3:2	5.2 km	MPC · JPL
636082	2014 OJ_{27}	—	September 26, 2006	Mount Lemmon	Mount Lemmon Survey	·	1.5 km	MPC · JPL
636083	2014 OK_{29}	—	October 26, 2011	Haleakala	Pan-STARRS 1	·	1.0 km	MPC · JPL
636084	2014 OH_{33}	—	January 20, 2008	Kitt Peak	Spacewatch	·	1.4 km	MPC · JPL
636085	2014 OZ_{39}	—	July 25, 2014	Haleakala	Pan-STARRS 1	·	1.3 km	MPC · JPL
636086	2014 OE_{53}	—	September 4, 2010	Mount Lemmon	Mount Lemmon Survey	·	1.2 km	MPC · JPL
636087	2014 OA_{59}	—	July 3, 2014	Haleakala	Pan-STARRS 1	·	1.3 km	MPC · JPL
636088	2014 OX_{59}	—	October 15, 2001	Kitt Peak	Spacewatch	HOF	3.1 km	MPC · JPL
636089	2014 OQ_{62}	—	August 31, 2005	Kitt Peak	Spacewatch	·	1.6 km	MPC · JPL
636090	2014 OY_{62}	—	March 19, 2013	Haleakala	Pan-STARRS 1	·	1.6 km	MPC · JPL
636091	2014 OA_{64}	—	September 29, 2010	Mount Lemmon	Mount Lemmon Survey	·	1.4 km	MPC · JPL
636092	2014 OD_{75}	—	April 10, 2005	Mount Lemmon	Mount Lemmon Survey	·	1.5 km	MPC · JPL
636093	2014 OR_{76}	—	October 2, 2006	Mount Lemmon	Mount Lemmon Survey	·	1.5 km	MPC · JPL
636094	2014 OU_{76}	—	February 14, 2013	Haleakala	Pan-STARRS 1	·	1.1 km	MPC · JPL
636095	2014 OO_{82}	—	June 19, 2009	Charleston	R. Holmes	·	3.8 km	MPC · JPL
636096	2014 OR_{86}	—	July 2, 2014	Haleakala	Pan-STARRS 1	·	1.6 km	MPC · JPL
636097	2014 OU_{91}	—	September 17, 2009	Bergisch Gladbach	W. Bickel	·	2.6 km	MPC · JPL
636098	2014 OO_{94}	—	November 3, 2010	Mount Lemmon	Mount Lemmon Survey	·	1.3 km	MPC · JPL
636099	2014 OD_{97}	—	February 9, 2008	Kitt Peak	Spacewatch	EUN	1.1 km	MPC · JPL
636100	2014 OM_{98}	—	January 19, 2012	Haleakala	Pan-STARRS 1	NAE	2.5 km	MPC · JPL

== 636101–636200 ==
back to top

Designation			Discovery			Properties		Ref
Permanent	Provisional	Named after	Date	Site	Discoverer(s)	Category	Diam.	Ref
636101	2014 OP_{104}	—	March 31, 2008	Mount Lemmon	Mount Lemmon Survey	·	1.7 km	MPC · JPL
636102	2014 OK_{108}	—	October 21, 2006	Kitt Peak	Spacewatch	·	1.6 km	MPC · JPL
636103	2014 OV_{108}	—	April 2, 2013	Mount Lemmon	Mount Lemmon Survey	·	1.5 km	MPC · JPL
636104	2014 OY_{110}	—	July 5, 2005	Palomar	NEAT	·	1.8 km	MPC · JPL
636105	2014 OT_{112}	—	June 27, 2014	ESA OGS	ESA OGS	·	1.2 km	MPC · JPL
636106	2014 OH_{116}	—	September 6, 2010	Piszkés-tető	K. Sárneczky, Z. Kuli	NEM	2.0 km	MPC · JPL
636107	2014 OS_{120}	—	April 10, 2013	Haleakala	Pan-STARRS 1	·	1.2 km	MPC · JPL
636108	2014 OR_{129}	—	November 10, 2004	Kitt Peak	Deep Ecliptic Survey	·	4.0 km	MPC · JPL
636109	2014 OP_{131}	—	April 20, 2009	Kitt Peak	Spacewatch	BRA	1.5 km	MPC · JPL
636110	2014 OA_{134}	—	September 4, 2010	Mount Lemmon	Mount Lemmon Survey	·	1.6 km	MPC · JPL
636111	2014 OD_{143}	—	August 27, 2005	Junk Bond	D. Healy	AGN	1.1 km	MPC · JPL
636112	2014 OP_{146}	—	July 4, 2014	Haleakala	Pan-STARRS 1	·	1.2 km	MPC · JPL
636113	2014 OK_{147}	—	July 27, 2014	Haleakala	Pan-STARRS 1	·	1.1 km	MPC · JPL
636114	2014 OK_{153}	—	September 18, 2006	Kitt Peak	Spacewatch	·	1.3 km	MPC · JPL
636115	2014 OZ_{167}	—	April 11, 2013	ESA OGS	ESA OGS	·	3.4 km	MPC · JPL
636116	2014 OT_{173}	—	February 13, 2013	Haleakala	Pan-STARRS 1	·	1.1 km	MPC · JPL
636117	2014 OH_{174}	—	March 19, 2013	Haleakala	Pan-STARRS 1	·	1.2 km	MPC · JPL
636118	2014 OY_{179}	—	July 6, 2014	Haleakala	Pan-STARRS 1	·	1.2 km	MPC · JPL
636119	2014 OX_{182}	—	March 2, 2008	Mount Lemmon	Mount Lemmon Survey	WIT	980 m	MPC · JPL
636120	2014 OA_{185}	—	September 19, 1998	Apache Point	SDSS	·	4.1 km	MPC · JPL
636121	2014 OQ_{186}	—	July 28, 2005	Palomar	NEAT	·	1.7 km	MPC · JPL
636122	2014 OW_{186}	—	June 24, 2014	Mount Lemmon	Mount Lemmon Survey	·	1.7 km	MPC · JPL
636123	2014 OT_{191}	—	September 17, 2003	Kitt Peak	Spacewatch	·	2.3 km	MPC · JPL
636124	2014 OG_{192}	—	September 23, 2000	Anderson Mesa	LONEOS	·	2.7 km	MPC · JPL
636125	2014 OJ_{193}	—	August 30, 2005	Kitt Peak	Spacewatch	·	1.9 km	MPC · JPL
636126	2014 OQ_{212}	—	September 14, 2002	Palomar	NEAT	MAR	1.1 km	MPC · JPL
636127	2014 OQ_{217}	—	November 16, 2006	Kitt Peak	Spacewatch	·	1.5 km	MPC · JPL
636128	2014 OD_{235}	—	October 6, 2008	Kitt Peak	Spacewatch	HNS	1.2 km	MPC · JPL
636129	2014 OH_{236}	—	November 30, 2000	Apache Point	SDSS Collaboration	·	1.3 km	MPC · JPL
636130	2014 OH_{239}	—	July 29, 2014	Haleakala	Pan-STARRS 1	·	960 m	MPC · JPL
636131	2014 OQ_{250}	—	July 29, 2014	Haleakala	Pan-STARRS 1	·	830 m	MPC · JPL
636132	2014 OH_{257}	—	September 25, 2006	Kitt Peak	Spacewatch	·	1.4 km	MPC · JPL
636133	2014 OG_{259}	—	February 11, 2004	Kitt Peak	Spacewatch	·	1.7 km	MPC · JPL
636134	2014 OB_{260}	—	July 10, 2005	Siding Spring	SSS	EUN	1.2 km	MPC · JPL
636135	2014 OO_{261}	—	December 17, 2007	Mount Lemmon	Mount Lemmon Survey	·	1.4 km	MPC · JPL
636136	2014 OF_{271}	—	April 29, 2009	Kitt Peak	Spacewatch	JUN	1.1 km	MPC · JPL
636137	2014 OZ_{271}	—	September 7, 2004	Kitt Peak	Spacewatch	·	2.8 km	MPC · JPL
636138	2014 OB_{275}	—	January 20, 2012	Kitt Peak	Spacewatch	·	1.6 km	MPC · JPL
636139	2014 OY_{288}	—	March 4, 2005	Catalina	CSS	·	1.2 km	MPC · JPL
636140	2014 OK_{295}	—	June 12, 2004	Apache Point	SDSS Collaboration	·	2.3 km	MPC · JPL
636141	2014 OL_{296}	—	April 13, 2001	Kitt Peak	Spacewatch	·	1.8 km	MPC · JPL
636142	2014 ON_{299}	—	January 28, 2007	Mount Lemmon	Mount Lemmon Survey	·	1.9 km	MPC · JPL
636143	2014 OS_{307}	—	October 12, 2010	Mount Lemmon	Mount Lemmon Survey	KOR	1.0 km	MPC · JPL
636144	2014 OT_{311}	—	July 27, 2014	Haleakala	Pan-STARRS 1	·	1.4 km	MPC · JPL
636145	2014 OY_{316}	—	October 19, 2006	Kitt Peak	Spacewatch	·	1.1 km	MPC · JPL
636146	2014 OT_{321}	—	December 26, 2011	Mount Lemmon	Mount Lemmon Survey	·	1.5 km	MPC · JPL
636147	2014 OB_{329}	—	June 27, 2014	Haleakala	Pan-STARRS 1	EUN	880 m	MPC · JPL
636148	2014 OJ_{329}	—	November 22, 2011	Mount Lemmon	Mount Lemmon Survey	·	1.1 km	MPC · JPL
636149	2014 OT_{334}	—	July 30, 2014	Haleakala	Pan-STARRS 1	(17392)	1.2 km	MPC · JPL
636150	2014 ON_{336}	—	November 26, 2006	Kitt Peak	Spacewatch	·	2.6 km	MPC · JPL
636151	2014 OR_{337}	—	June 4, 2014	Haleakala	Pan-STARRS 1	·	1.4 km	MPC · JPL
636152	2014 OR_{349}	—	August 22, 2009	Dauban	C. Rinner, Kugel, F.	·	3.9 km	MPC · JPL
636153	2014 OJ_{353}	—	October 1, 2010	Kitt Peak	Spacewatch	·	1.7 km	MPC · JPL
636154	2014 OB_{355}	—	April 30, 2009	Kitt Peak	Spacewatch	·	1.1 km	MPC · JPL
636155	2014 OU_{355}	—	April 7, 2013	Mount Lemmon	Mount Lemmon Survey	·	1.2 km	MPC · JPL
636156	2014 OR_{360}	—	April 9, 2013	Haleakala	Pan-STARRS 1	·	1.1 km	MPC · JPL
636157	2014 OG_{371}	—	July 30, 2014	Haleakala	Pan-STARRS 1	3:2	4.9 km	MPC · JPL
636158	2014 OT_{373}	—	May 15, 2005	Mount Lemmon	Mount Lemmon Survey	·	1.4 km	MPC · JPL
636159	2014 OA_{375}	—	April 1, 2003	Apache Point	SDSS	·	2.1 km	MPC · JPL
636160	2014 OC_{375}	—	July 15, 2005	Mount Lemmon	Mount Lemmon Survey	·	1.6 km	MPC · JPL
636161	2014 OP_{375}	—	May 4, 2009	Mount Lemmon	Mount Lemmon Survey	·	1.3 km	MPC · JPL
636162	2014 OV_{375}	—	March 15, 2013	Mount Lemmon	Mount Lemmon Survey	·	1.5 km	MPC · JPL
636163	2014 OH_{377}	—	September 29, 2010	Mount Lemmon	Mount Lemmon Survey	·	1.5 km	MPC · JPL
636164	2014 OE_{379}	—	January 10, 2006	Mount Lemmon	Mount Lemmon Survey	THM	3.3 km	MPC · JPL
636165	2014 OA_{383}	—	May 1, 2009	Cerro Burek	I. de la Cueva	EUN	1.0 km	MPC · JPL
636166	2014 OR_{383}	—	September 19, 2001	Kitt Peak	Spacewatch	NEM	2.0 km	MPC · JPL
636167	2014 OG_{386}	—	October 1, 2010	Mount Lemmon	Mount Lemmon Survey	NEM	1.9 km	MPC · JPL
636168	2014 OA_{388}	—	April 3, 2013	Mount Lemmon	Mount Lemmon Survey	·	1.7 km	MPC · JPL
636169	2014 OD_{389}	—	March 13, 2013	Mount Lemmon	Mount Lemmon Survey	·	1.1 km	MPC · JPL
636170	2014 OE_{389}	—	August 20, 2003	Haleakala	NEAT	MAS	840 m	MPC · JPL
636171	2014 OF_{390}	—	March 14, 2012	Haleakala	Pan-STARRS 1	·	3.5 km	MPC · JPL
636172	2014 OA_{400}	—	March 22, 2012	Mount Lemmon	Mount Lemmon Survey	EOS	1.6 km	MPC · JPL
636173	2014 OO_{401}	—	October 2, 2010	Kitt Peak	Spacewatch	·	1.2 km	MPC · JPL
636174	2014 OT_{402}	—	July 25, 2014	Haleakala	Pan-STARRS 1	MIS	2.0 km	MPC · JPL
636175	2014 OO_{403}	—	September 29, 2010	Mount Lemmon	Mount Lemmon Survey	·	1.4 km	MPC · JPL
636176	2014 OU_{403}	—	March 1, 2008	Kitt Peak	Spacewatch	·	1.8 km	MPC · JPL
636177	2014 OV_{403}	—	September 12, 2001	Kitt Peak	Spacewatch	·	1.1 km	MPC · JPL
636178	2014 OC_{410}	—	July 4, 2014	Haleakala	Pan-STARRS 1	·	1.4 km	MPC · JPL
636179	2014 OP_{411}	—	January 14, 2012	Kitt Peak	Spacewatch	·	1.4 km	MPC · JPL
636180	2014 OR_{411}	—	October 17, 2010	Mount Lemmon	Mount Lemmon Survey	HOF	1.9 km	MPC · JPL
636181	2014 OO_{413}	—	September 1, 2005	Palomar	NEAT	·	1.6 km	MPC · JPL
636182	2014 OV_{414}	—	May 15, 2013	Haleakala	Pan-STARRS 1	·	1.9 km	MPC · JPL
636183	2014 OF_{415}	—	July 31, 2014	Haleakala	Pan-STARRS 1	·	1.6 km	MPC · JPL
636184	2014 OB_{432}	—	July 25, 2014	Haleakala	Pan-STARRS 1	(5)	960 m	MPC · JPL
636185	2014 PK	—	October 10, 2010	Kitt Peak	Spacewatch	·	1.6 km	MPC · JPL
636186	2014 PA_{2}	—	February 12, 2000	Apache Point	SDSS Collaboration	·	1.6 km	MPC · JPL
636187	2014 PH_{6}	—	June 24, 2014	Kitt Peak	Spacewatch	·	1.5 km	MPC · JPL
636188	2014 PL_{7}	—	August 22, 2006	Cerro Tololo	Deep Ecliptic Survey	·	1.8 km	MPC · JPL
636189	2014 PO_{16}	—	October 8, 2004	Kitt Peak	Spacewatch	·	2.4 km	MPC · JPL
636190	2014 PQ_{16}	—	January 27, 2007	Kitt Peak	Spacewatch	KOR	1.3 km	MPC · JPL
636191	2014 PC_{24}	—	March 13, 2007	Mount Lemmon	Mount Lemmon Survey	·	2.0 km	MPC · JPL
636192	2014 PC_{26}	—	October 28, 2010	Mount Lemmon	Mount Lemmon Survey	·	1.5 km	MPC · JPL
636193	2014 PA_{29}	—	April 30, 2009	Kitt Peak	Spacewatch	·	1.2 km	MPC · JPL
636194	2014 PQ_{35}	—	December 22, 2006	Kitt Peak	Spacewatch	·	1.3 km	MPC · JPL
636195	2014 PN_{41}	—	March 27, 2008	Mount Lemmon	Mount Lemmon Survey	·	1.6 km	MPC · JPL
636196	2014 PM_{42}	—	July 28, 2014	Haleakala	Pan-STARRS 1	GEF	1.1 km	MPC · JPL
636197	2014 PS_{43}	—	May 15, 2013	Haleakala	Pan-STARRS 1	·	1.6 km	MPC · JPL
636198	2014 PU_{48}	—	August 31, 2005	Palomar	NEAT	·	2.5 km	MPC · JPL
636199	2014 PQ_{54}	—	November 12, 2001	Apache Point	SDSS Collaboration	·	1.6 km	MPC · JPL
636200	2014 PY_{54}	—	February 19, 2002	Kitt Peak	Spacewatch	·	2.2 km	MPC · JPL

== 636201–636300 ==
back to top

Designation			Discovery			Properties		Ref
Permanent	Provisional	Named after	Date	Site	Discoverer(s)	Category	Diam.	Ref
636201	2014 PP_{66}	—	October 16, 2002	Palomar	NEAT	·	1.0 km	MPC · JPL
636202	2014 PQ_{67}	—	September 25, 2006	Kitt Peak	Spacewatch	·	1.3 km	MPC · JPL
636203	2014 PL_{69}	—	September 30, 2005	Mauna Kea	A. Boattini	·	3.0 km	MPC · JPL
636204	2014 PU_{72}	—	August 15, 2014	Haleakala	Pan-STARRS 1	·	1.1 km	MPC · JPL
636205	2014 PE_{76}	—	April 12, 2013	Haleakala	Pan-STARRS 1	·	1.2 km	MPC · JPL
636206	2014 PS_{77}	—	January 19, 2012	Haleakala	Pan-STARRS 1	·	1.7 km	MPC · JPL
636207	2014 PR_{79}	—	March 15, 2004	Kitt Peak	Spacewatch	·	1.4 km	MPC · JPL
636208	2014 PY_{79}	—	February 24, 2008	Kitt Peak	Spacewatch	·	1.8 km	MPC · JPL
636209	2014 PC_{81}	—	March 18, 2009	Kitt Peak	Spacewatch	·	1.3 km	MPC · JPL
636210	2014 QP_{1}	—	May 15, 2005	Palomar	NEAT	·	1.5 km	MPC · JPL
636211	2014 QA_{12}	—	September 18, 2009	Catalina	CSS	·	2.9 km	MPC · JPL
636212	2014 QB_{12}	—	June 22, 2014	Mount Lemmon	Mount Lemmon Survey	JUN	860 m	MPC · JPL
636213	2014 QG_{23}	—	May 26, 2009	Kitt Peak	Spacewatch	·	1.3 km	MPC · JPL
636214	2014 QX_{24}	—	July 5, 2002	Palomar	NEAT	·	1.9 km	MPC · JPL
636215	2014 QK_{26}	—	October 13, 2010	Mount Lemmon	Mount Lemmon Survey	·	1.4 km	MPC · JPL
636216	2014 QV_{27}	—	August 18, 2014	Haleakala	Pan-STARRS 1	(11882)	1.4 km	MPC · JPL
636217	2014 QY_{29}	—	August 18, 2014	Haleakala	Pan-STARRS 1	AGN	1.0 km	MPC · JPL
636218	2014 QR_{30}	—	August 27, 2005	Palomar	NEAT	·	2.0 km	MPC · JPL
636219	2014 QN_{31}	—	September 21, 2004	Socorro	LINEAR	·	2.3 km	MPC · JPL
636220	2014 QR_{35}	—	March 7, 2013	Mount Lemmon	Mount Lemmon Survey	MAR	780 m	MPC · JPL
636221	2014 QJ_{42}	—	August 31, 2005	Kitt Peak	Spacewatch	·	1.4 km	MPC · JPL
636222	2014 QC_{45}	—	October 16, 2006	Kitt Peak	Spacewatch	·	1.4 km	MPC · JPL
636223	2014 QO_{46}	—	August 10, 2010	Kitt Peak	Spacewatch	·	1.2 km	MPC · JPL
636224	2014 QH_{50}	—	March 17, 2013	Mount Lemmon	Mount Lemmon Survey	·	1.5 km	MPC · JPL
636225	2014 QD_{53}	—	July 28, 2014	Haleakala	Pan-STARRS 1	·	1.4 km	MPC · JPL
636226	2014 QL_{60}	—	February 8, 2013	Haleakala	Pan-STARRS 1	·	1.4 km	MPC · JPL
636227	2014 QC_{64}	—	August 3, 2014	Haleakala	Pan-STARRS 1	·	1.4 km	MPC · JPL
636228	2014 QB_{69}	—	April 3, 2009	Mount Lemmon	Mount Lemmon Survey	·	1.1 km	MPC · JPL
636229	2014 QP_{71}	—	March 17, 2004	Kitt Peak	Spacewatch	·	1.4 km	MPC · JPL
636230	2014 QQ_{78}	—	August 20, 2014	Haleakala	Pan-STARRS 1	·	1.5 km	MPC · JPL
636231	2014 QP_{85}	—	September 28, 2006	Kitt Peak	Spacewatch	·	1.1 km	MPC · JPL
636232	2014 QO_{86}	—	March 6, 2013	Haleakala	Pan-STARRS 1	EUN	990 m	MPC · JPL
636233	2014 QO_{89}	—	July 30, 2014	Kitt Peak	Spacewatch	·	1.6 km	MPC · JPL
636234	2014 QT_{89}	—	July 30, 2014	Kitt Peak	Spacewatch	EUN	840 m	MPC · JPL
636235	2014 QZ_{90}	—	May 3, 2013	Mount Lemmon	Mount Lemmon Survey	·	2.1 km	MPC · JPL
636236	2014 QQ_{91}	—	August 8, 2005	Cerro Tololo	Deep Ecliptic Survey	DOR	1.9 km	MPC · JPL
636237	2014 QQ_{99}	—	November 19, 2006	Kitt Peak	Spacewatch	WIT	780 m	MPC · JPL
636238	2014 QQ_{100}	—	October 11, 2010	Mount Lemmon	Mount Lemmon Survey	·	1.5 km	MPC · JPL
636239	2014 QU_{104}	—	September 7, 2010	Piszkés-tető	K. Sárneczky, Z. Kuli	·	1.8 km	MPC · JPL
636240	2014 QN_{108}	—	September 29, 2010	Mount Lemmon	Mount Lemmon Survey	·	1.3 km	MPC · JPL
636241	2014 QZ_{110}	—	October 6, 2005	Mount Lemmon	Mount Lemmon Survey	·	1.7 km	MPC · JPL
636242	2014 QK_{113}	—	September 28, 2006	Kitt Peak	Spacewatch	(5)	850 m	MPC · JPL
636243	2014 QP_{113}	—	April 10, 2013	Haleakala	Pan-STARRS 1	·	1.7 km	MPC · JPL
636244	2014 QV_{116}	—	February 10, 2008	Mount Lemmon	Mount Lemmon Survey	·	1.4 km	MPC · JPL
636245	2014 QD_{122}	—	August 20, 2014	Haleakala	Pan-STARRS 1	·	880 m	MPC · JPL
636246	2014 QF_{125}	—	November 8, 2010	Mount Lemmon	Mount Lemmon Survey	NEM	1.9 km	MPC · JPL
636247	2014 QF_{126}	—	August 29, 2005	Kitt Peak	Spacewatch	·	1.4 km	MPC · JPL
636248	2014 QO_{130}	—	January 19, 2012	Haleakala	Pan-STARRS 1	·	1.4 km	MPC · JPL
636249	2014 QO_{134}	—	February 1, 2012	Mount Lemmon	Mount Lemmon Survey	·	1.4 km	MPC · JPL
636250	2014 QN_{135}	—	October 30, 2010	Mount Lemmon	Mount Lemmon Survey	·	2.2 km	MPC · JPL
636251	2014 QO_{138}	—	August 20, 2014	Haleakala	Pan-STARRS 1	·	1.6 km	MPC · JPL
636252	2014 QR_{141}	—	October 26, 2001	Palomar Mountain	NEAT	ADE	1.8 km	MPC · JPL
636253	2014 QL_{142}	—	March 31, 2008	Mount Lemmon	Mount Lemmon Survey	AGN	1.1 km	MPC · JPL
636254	2014 QG_{145}	—	September 18, 2010	Mount Lemmon	Mount Lemmon Survey	·	1.4 km	MPC · JPL
636255	2014 QP_{147}	—	August 27, 2005	Kitt Peak	Spacewatch	AGN	1.0 km	MPC · JPL
636256	2014 QR_{151}	—	August 20, 2014	Haleakala	Pan-STARRS 1	·	1.7 km	MPC · JPL
636257	2014 QS_{156}	—	November 24, 2003	Kitt Peak	Deep Ecliptic Survey	·	1.1 km	MPC · JPL
636258	2014 QC_{161}	—	March 24, 2003	Kitt Peak	Spacewatch	·	2.7 km	MPC · JPL
636259	2014 QO_{172}	—	April 2, 2013	Mount Lemmon	Mount Lemmon Survey	·	1.1 km	MPC · JPL
636260	2014 QT_{174}	—	February 12, 2012	Mount Lemmon	Mount Lemmon Survey	·	1.4 km	MPC · JPL
636261	2014 QD_{176}	—	August 24, 2003	Cerro Tololo	Deep Ecliptic Survey	·	1.9 km	MPC · JPL
636262	2014 QN_{178}	—	January 19, 2012	Mount Lemmon	Mount Lemmon Survey	·	1.1 km	MPC · JPL
636263	2014 QW_{179}	—	September 12, 2001	Socorro	LINEAR	·	1.8 km	MPC · JPL
636264	2014 QU_{182}	—	October 11, 2001	Palomar	NEAT	·	1.9 km	MPC · JPL
636265	2014 QJ_{183}	—	September 18, 2010	Mount Lemmon	Mount Lemmon Survey	·	1.2 km	MPC · JPL
636266	2014 QD_{193}	—	November 16, 2006	Mount Lemmon	Mount Lemmon Survey	·	1.5 km	MPC · JPL
636267	2014 QP_{194}	—	April 16, 2013	Haleakala	Pan-STARRS 1	WIT	880 m	MPC · JPL
636268	2014 QZ_{196}	—	April 22, 2009	Kitt Peak	Spacewatch	EUN	880 m	MPC · JPL
636269	2014 QE_{198}	—	October 12, 2010	Mount Lemmon	Mount Lemmon Survey	·	1.8 km	MPC · JPL
636270	2014 QX_{198}	—	August 22, 2014	Haleakala	Pan-STARRS 1	·	1.1 km	MPC · JPL
636271	2014 QQ_{199}	—	March 16, 2008	Kitt Peak	Spacewatch	·	1.7 km	MPC · JPL
636272	2014 QG_{204}	—	March 12, 2005	Kitt Peak	Spacewatch	·	1.8 km	MPC · JPL
636273	2014 QL_{210}	—	January 10, 2008	Kitt Peak	Spacewatch	·	2.0 km	MPC · JPL
636274	2014 QE_{219}	—	February 2, 2008	Kitt Peak	Spacewatch	·	1.6 km	MPC · JPL
636275	2014 QH_{226}	—	August 20, 2014	Haleakala	Pan-STARRS 1	·	1.4 km	MPC · JPL
636276	2014 QJ_{231}	—	August 20, 2014	Haleakala	Pan-STARRS 1	PAD	1.3 km	MPC · JPL
636277	2014 QT_{234}	—	August 27, 2005	Palomar	NEAT	·	1.7 km	MPC · JPL
636278	2014 QQ_{237}	—	April 7, 2013	Mount Lemmon	Mount Lemmon Survey	·	1.3 km	MPC · JPL
636279	2014 QS_{238}	—	November 10, 2010	Mount Lemmon	Mount Lemmon Survey	·	1.4 km	MPC · JPL
636280	2014 QV_{239}	—	July 28, 2014	Haleakala	Pan-STARRS 1	·	1.7 km	MPC · JPL
636281	2014 QL_{255}	—	October 21, 2003	Kitt Peak	Spacewatch	·	3.4 km	MPC · JPL
636282	2014 QM_{267}	—	April 10, 2013	Haleakala	Pan-STARRS 1	EUN	1.1 km	MPC · JPL
636283	2014 QP_{270}	—	February 3, 2012	Haleakala	Pan-STARRS 1	NEM	2.1 km	MPC · JPL
636284	2014 QP_{280}	—	December 31, 2011	Kitt Peak	Spacewatch	·	1.5 km	MPC · JPL
636285	2014 QU_{281}	—	August 14, 2010	Kitt Peak	Spacewatch	·	1.2 km	MPC · JPL
636286	2014 QP_{291}	—	October 3, 2006	Mount Lemmon	Mount Lemmon Survey	·	1.3 km	MPC · JPL
636287	2014 QU_{299}	—	September 13, 2005	Kitt Peak	Spacewatch	·	1.4 km	MPC · JPL
636288	2014 QQ_{301}	—	July 3, 2005	Palomar	NEAT	·	1.3 km	MPC · JPL
636289	2014 QQ_{306}	—	October 3, 2010	Kitt Peak	Spacewatch	·	1.1 km	MPC · JPL
636290	2014 QC_{310}	—	October 31, 2006	Kitt Peak	Spacewatch	EUN	1.3 km	MPC · JPL
636291	2014 QD_{313}	—	February 2, 1995	Kitt Peak	Spacewatch	·	1.5 km	MPC · JPL
636292	2014 QV_{313}	—	December 2, 2010	Mount Lemmon	Mount Lemmon Survey	·	1.4 km	MPC · JPL
636293	2014 QQ_{326}	—	November 18, 1996	Kitt Peak	Spacewatch	·	1.9 km	MPC · JPL
636294	2014 QC_{330}	—	January 19, 2012	Haleakala	Pan-STARRS 1	·	1.7 km	MPC · JPL
636295	2014 QV_{332}	—	April 19, 2013	Haleakala	Pan-STARRS 1	·	1.5 km	MPC · JPL
636296	2014 QG_{335}	—	February 13, 2008	Kitt Peak	Spacewatch	·	1.6 km	MPC · JPL
636297	2014 QF_{337}	—	August 20, 2006	Kitt Peak	Spacewatch	·	980 m	MPC · JPL
636298	2014 QL_{338}	—	July 21, 2006	Mount Lemmon	Mount Lemmon Survey	·	1.3 km	MPC · JPL
636299	2014 QA_{344}	—	January 18, 2008	Kitt Peak	Spacewatch	·	1.3 km	MPC · JPL
636300	2014 QE_{344}	—	October 12, 2010	Mount Lemmon	Mount Lemmon Survey	·	1.5 km	MPC · JPL

== 636301–636400 ==
back to top

Designation			Discovery			Properties		Ref
Permanent	Provisional	Named after	Date	Site	Discoverer(s)	Category	Diam.	Ref
636301	2014 QZ_{346}	—	August 15, 2014	Haleakala	Pan-STARRS 1	·	1.7 km	MPC · JPL
636302	2014 QY_{349}	—	March 12, 2007	Mount Lemmon	Mount Lemmon Survey	·	2.1 km	MPC · JPL
636303	2014 QE_{351}	—	February 28, 2008	Kitt Peak	Spacewatch	·	1.5 km	MPC · JPL
636304	2014 QH_{351}	—	September 18, 2001	Apache Point	SDSS Collaboration	·	1.3 km	MPC · JPL
636305	2014 QF_{354}	—	August 27, 2014	Haleakala	Pan-STARRS 1	·	1.4 km	MPC · JPL
636306	2014 QX_{358}	—	August 26, 2003	Cerro Tololo	Deep Ecliptic Survey	·	2.6 km	MPC · JPL
636307	2014 QV_{360}	—	August 27, 2014	Haleakala	Pan-STARRS 1	HOF	2.1 km	MPC · JPL
636308	2014 QE_{369}	—	March 13, 2013	Mount Lemmon	Mount Lemmon Survey	LEO	1.4 km	MPC · JPL
636309	2014 QD_{372}	—	August 27, 2014	Haleakala	Pan-STARRS 1	·	1.6 km	MPC · JPL
636310	2014 QG_{381}	—	January 27, 2012	Mount Lemmon	Mount Lemmon Survey	·	1.4 km	MPC · JPL
636311	2014 QX_{393}	—	October 28, 2010	Mount Lemmon	Mount Lemmon Survey	·	1.0 km	MPC · JPL
636312	2014 QK_{401}	—	August 28, 2014	Haleakala	Pan-STARRS 1	PAD	1.2 km	MPC · JPL
636313	2014 QW_{404}	—	July 23, 2009	Siding Spring	SSS	·	2.3 km	MPC · JPL
636314	2014 QF_{405}	—	August 28, 2014	Haleakala	Pan-STARRS 1	MAR	930 m	MPC · JPL
636315	2014 QW_{412}	—	January 2, 2012	Kitt Peak	Spacewatch	PAD	1.6 km	MPC · JPL
636316	2014 QV_{416}	—	September 17, 2001	Kitt Peak	Spacewatch	·	1.4 km	MPC · JPL
636317	2014 QN_{418}	—	November 14, 2010	Kitt Peak	Spacewatch	·	2.0 km	MPC · JPL
636318	2014 QM_{419}	—	August 30, 2014	Mount Lemmon	Mount Lemmon Survey	EOS	2.1 km	MPC · JPL
636319	2014 QO_{429}	—	September 12, 2005	Kitt Peak	Spacewatch	·	1.7 km	MPC · JPL
636320	2014 QE_{432}	—	March 17, 2012	Mount Lemmon	Mount Lemmon Survey	·	1.9 km	MPC · JPL
636321	2014 QR_{435}	—	September 30, 2005	Anderson Mesa	LONEOS	·	1.7 km	MPC · JPL
636322	2014 QW_{440}	—	October 27, 2009	Mount Lemmon	Mount Lemmon Survey	·	3.6 km	MPC · JPL
636323	2014 QC_{448}	—	July 31, 2014	Haleakala	Pan-STARRS 1	KOR	1.0 km	MPC · JPL
636324	2014 QS_{448}	—	January 7, 2006	Mount Lemmon	Mount Lemmon Survey	EOS	1.9 km	MPC · JPL
636325	2014 QT_{448}	—	January 19, 2012	Haleakala	Pan-STARRS 1	·	1.6 km	MPC · JPL
636326	2014 QU_{448}	—	August 31, 2014	Haleakala	Pan-STARRS 1	·	1.8 km	MPC · JPL
636327	2014 QW_{453}	—	August 23, 2014	Haleakala	Pan-STARRS 1	EOS	2.0 km	MPC · JPL
636328	2014 QN_{455}	—	February 21, 2007	Mount Lemmon	Mount Lemmon Survey	·	1.7 km	MPC · JPL
636329	2014 QV_{455}	—	April 30, 2013	Mount Lemmon	Mount Lemmon Survey	·	1.3 km	MPC · JPL
636330	2014 QC_{456}	—	April 11, 2013	ESA OGS	ESA OGS	·	1.6 km	MPC · JPL
636331	2014 QS_{458}	—	August 19, 2014	Haleakala	Pan-STARRS 1	·	1.8 km	MPC · JPL
636332	2014 QT_{458}	—	August 19, 2014	Haleakala	Pan-STARRS 1	(12739)	1.2 km	MPC · JPL
636333	2014 QY_{458}	—	August 19, 2014	Haleakala	Pan-STARRS 1	·	1.2 km	MPC · JPL
636334	2014 QC_{461}	—	January 19, 2012	Haleakala	Pan-STARRS 1	WIT	870 m	MPC · JPL
636335	2014 QA_{466}	—	August 25, 2014	Haleakala	Pan-STARRS 1	·	1.4 km	MPC · JPL
636336	2014 QQ_{468}	—	March 1, 2008	Kitt Peak	Spacewatch	·	1.3 km	MPC · JPL
636337	2014 QW_{469}	—	August 28, 2014	Haleakala	Pan-STARRS 1	·	1.9 km	MPC · JPL
636338	2014 QJ_{472}	—	August 31, 2014	Kitt Peak	Spacewatch	·	1.6 km	MPC · JPL
636339	2014 QN_{477}	—	April 18, 2009	Mount Lemmon	Mount Lemmon Survey	·	1.0 km	MPC · JPL
636340	2014 QW_{477}	—	January 26, 2003	Kitt Peak	Spacewatch	·	2.2 km	MPC · JPL
636341	2014 QC_{481}	—	January 19, 2012	Mount Lemmon	Mount Lemmon Survey	·	1.4 km	MPC · JPL
636342	2014 QV_{481}	—	March 28, 2008	Mount Lemmon	Mount Lemmon Survey	MRX	900 m	MPC · JPL
636343	2014 QH_{485}	—	August 21, 2001	Kitt Peak	Spacewatch	·	1.1 km	MPC · JPL
636344	2014 QV_{485}	—	January 30, 2006	Kitt Peak	Spacewatch	EOS	2.0 km	MPC · JPL
636345	2014 QZ_{485}	—	April 1, 2008	Mount Lemmon	Mount Lemmon Survey	·	1.9 km	MPC · JPL
636346	2014 QF_{486}	—	February 2, 2006	Kitt Peak	Spacewatch	·	2.9 km	MPC · JPL
636347	2014 QL_{490}	—	July 20, 2007	Lulin	LUSS	·	780 m	MPC · JPL
636348	2014 QF_{492}	—	August 24, 2005	Palomar	NEAT	·	1.7 km	MPC · JPL
636349	2014 QH_{493}	—	March 28, 2009	Catalina	CSS	·	1.8 km	MPC · JPL
636350	2014 QR_{493}	—	September 12, 2005	Kitt Peak	Spacewatch	·	1.3 km	MPC · JPL
636351	2014 QF_{519}	—	August 22, 2014	Haleakala	Pan-STARRS 1	·	1.1 km	MPC · JPL
636352	2014 QL_{528}	—	August 25, 2014	Haleakala	Pan-STARRS 1	·	1.3 km	MPC · JPL
636353	2014 QN_{547}	—	December 29, 2011	Mount Lemmon	Mount Lemmon Survey	KON	2.1 km	MPC · JPL
636354	2014 QA_{548}	—	August 27, 2014	Haleakala	Pan-STARRS 1	EUN	970 m	MPC · JPL
636355	2014 QO_{554}	—	August 22, 2014	Haleakala	Pan-STARRS 1	·	1.2 km	MPC · JPL
636356	2014 QM_{556}	—	August 20, 2014	Haleakala	Pan-STARRS 1	·	1.2 km	MPC · JPL
636357	2014 QG_{568}	—	August 18, 2014	Haleakala	Pan-STARRS 1	PHO	900 m	MPC · JPL
636358	2014 QD_{578}	—	October 30, 2005	Sacramento Peak	SDSS Collaboration	·	1.4 km	MPC · JPL
636359	2014 RO_{1}	—	October 17, 2009	Catalina	CSS	·	4.3 km	MPC · JPL
636360	2014 RQ_{2}	—	July 7, 2014	Haleakala	Pan-STARRS 1	·	1.0 km	MPC · JPL
636361	2014 RA_{6}	—	October 1, 2005	Catalina	CSS	·	1.8 km	MPC · JPL
636362	2014 RV_{7}	—	October 22, 2006	Mount Lemmon	Mount Lemmon Survey	·	1.2 km	MPC · JPL
636363	2014 RE_{10}	—	December 21, 2006	Kitt Peak	L. H. Wasserman, M. W. Buie	HOF	2.4 km	MPC · JPL
636364	2014 RV_{10}	—	August 28, 2003	Palomar	NEAT	·	2.3 km	MPC · JPL
636365	2014 RX_{14}	—	August 19, 2014	Haleakala	Pan-STARRS 1	·	1.8 km	MPC · JPL
636366	2014 RL_{20}	—	September 18, 2009	Kitt Peak	Spacewatch	EOS	2.3 km	MPC · JPL
636367	2014 RT_{21}	—	October 23, 2003	Apache Point	SDSS Collaboration	VER	2.9 km	MPC · JPL
636368	2014 RD_{25}	—	March 6, 2013	Haleakala	Pan-STARRS 1	·	1.6 km	MPC · JPL
636369	2014 RK_{28}	—	October 17, 2010	Mount Lemmon	Mount Lemmon Survey	·	1.3 km	MPC · JPL
636370	2014 RM_{28}	—	November 16, 1995	Kitt Peak	Spacewatch	·	1.7 km	MPC · JPL
636371	2014 RF_{32}	—	January 19, 2012	Haleakala	Pan-STARRS 1	·	1.5 km	MPC · JPL
636372	2014 RC_{36}	—	October 17, 2010	Mount Lemmon	Mount Lemmon Survey	·	1.4 km	MPC · JPL
636373	2014 RO_{38}	—	August 31, 2005	Kitt Peak	Spacewatch	PAD	1.6 km	MPC · JPL
636374	2014 RX_{38}	—	November 25, 2005	Kitt Peak	Spacewatch	·	2.4 km	MPC · JPL
636375	2014 RV_{39}	—	November 12, 2010	Mount Lemmon	Mount Lemmon Survey	·	1.4 km	MPC · JPL
636376	2014 RK_{51}	—	July 3, 2014	Haleakala	Pan-STARRS 1	·	890 m	MPC · JPL
636377	2014 RM_{56}	—	October 4, 2005	Mount Lemmon	Mount Lemmon Survey	AGN	1.1 km	MPC · JPL
636378	2014 RW_{57}	—	September 15, 2014	Mount Lemmon	Mount Lemmon Survey	·	2.2 km	MPC · JPL
636379	2014 RM_{58}	—	September 15, 2014	Mount Lemmon	Mount Lemmon Survey	AST	1.2 km	MPC · JPL
636380	2014 RP_{59}	—	February 8, 2008	Mount Lemmon	Mount Lemmon Survey	·	1.5 km	MPC · JPL
636381	2014 RY_{62}	—	January 7, 2006	Kitt Peak	Spacewatch	·	3.3 km	MPC · JPL
636382	2014 RY_{64}	—	February 16, 2007	7300	W. K. Y. Yeung	AGN	980 m	MPC · JPL
636383	2014 RD_{65}	—	April 17, 2013	Haleakala	Pan-STARRS 1	·	1.5 km	MPC · JPL
636384	2014 RO_{65}	—	January 30, 2011	Haleakala	Pan-STARRS 1	EOS	1.4 km	MPC · JPL
636385	2014 RN_{67}	—	June 15, 2009	Mount Lemmon	Mount Lemmon Survey	·	1.4 km	MPC · JPL
636386	2014 RO_{67}	—	September 2, 2014	Haleakala	Pan-STARRS 1	·	1.3 km	MPC · JPL
636387	2014 RR_{78}	—	September 4, 2014	Haleakala	Pan-STARRS 1	L5	6.3 km	MPC · JPL
636388	2014 SS	—	September 6, 2008	Siding Spring	SSS	T_{j} (2.98) · EUP	3.9 km	MPC · JPL
636389	2014 SK_{6}	—	February 28, 2008	Kitt Peak	Spacewatch	·	1.4 km	MPC · JPL
636390	2014 SR_{8}	—	October 15, 2004	Mount Lemmon	Mount Lemmon Survey	·	2.1 km	MPC · JPL
636391	2014 SB_{9}	—	March 13, 2008	Kitt Peak	Spacewatch	·	1.4 km	MPC · JPL
636392	2014 SB_{10}	—	March 13, 2008	Mount Lemmon	Mount Lemmon Survey	·	1.3 km	MPC · JPL
636393	2014 SC_{18}	—	April 26, 2008	Mount Lemmon	Mount Lemmon Survey	·	1.4 km	MPC · JPL
636394	2014 SS_{19}	—	November 28, 2010	Mount Lemmon	Mount Lemmon Survey	·	1.4 km	MPC · JPL
636395	2014 SU_{19}	—	June 18, 2005	Mount Lemmon	Mount Lemmon Survey	·	1.5 km	MPC · JPL
636396	2014 SY_{19}	—	August 27, 2009	Kitt Peak	Spacewatch	·	2.0 km	MPC · JPL
636397	2014 ST_{21}	—	September 26, 2005	Kitt Peak	Spacewatch	·	1.7 km	MPC · JPL
636398	2014 SR_{22}	—	September 29, 2005	Mount Lemmon	Mount Lemmon Survey	HOF	2.2 km	MPC · JPL
636399	2014 SV_{35}	—	April 8, 2002	Cerro Tololo	Deep Ecliptic Survey	·	1.8 km	MPC · JPL
636400	2014 SF_{38}	—	September 17, 2014	Haleakala	Pan-STARRS 1	·	1.7 km	MPC · JPL

== 636401–636500 ==
back to top

Designation			Discovery			Properties		Ref
Permanent	Provisional	Named after	Date	Site	Discoverer(s)	Category	Diam.	Ref
636401	2014 ST_{46}	—	September 18, 2003	Palomar	NEAT	·	3.2 km	MPC · JPL
636402	2014 SZ_{46}	—	October 31, 2010	Mount Lemmon	Mount Lemmon Survey	·	1.6 km	MPC · JPL
636403	2014 SC_{49}	—	April 15, 2013	Haleakala	Pan-STARRS 1	·	1.3 km	MPC · JPL
636404	2014 SE_{50}	—	August 22, 2014	Haleakala	Pan-STARRS 1	·	1.6 km	MPC · JPL
636405	2014 SM_{53}	—	October 1, 2010	Mount Lemmon	Mount Lemmon Survey	·	970 m	MPC · JPL
636406	2014 SS_{54}	—	October 17, 2010	Mount Lemmon	Mount Lemmon Survey	·	1.4 km	MPC · JPL
636407	2014 SL_{57}	—	July 7, 2014	Haleakala	Pan-STARRS 1	·	1.9 km	MPC · JPL
636408	2014 SM_{57}	—	November 8, 2010	Kitt Peak	Spacewatch	·	1.7 km	MPC · JPL
636409	2014 SR_{60}	—	February 3, 2012	Mount Lemmon	Mount Lemmon Survey	·	1.6 km	MPC · JPL
636410	2014 SR_{63}	—	October 17, 2010	Mount Lemmon	Mount Lemmon Survey	·	1.3 km	MPC · JPL
636411	2014 SZ_{63}	—	September 30, 2010	Mount Lemmon	Mount Lemmon Survey	·	1.5 km	MPC · JPL
636412	2014 SE_{65}	—	August 20, 2001	Cerro Tololo	Deep Ecliptic Survey	·	1.3 km	MPC · JPL
636413	2014 SC_{68}	—	July 30, 2014	Haleakala	Pan-STARRS 1	·	1.5 km	MPC · JPL
636414	2014 ST_{68}	—	August 4, 2014	Haleakala	Pan-STARRS 1	·	1.4 km	MPC · JPL
636415	2014 SB_{69}	—	February 28, 2008	Kitt Peak	Spacewatch	·	1.8 km	MPC · JPL
636416	2014 SC_{71}	—	February 20, 2012	Haleakala	Pan-STARRS 1	·	2.8 km	MPC · JPL
636417	2014 SU_{76}	—	September 5, 2010	Mount Lemmon	Mount Lemmon Survey	TRE	3.1 km	MPC · JPL
636418	2014 SQ_{80}	—	October 28, 2010	Mount Lemmon	Mount Lemmon Survey	·	1.7 km	MPC · JPL
636419	2014 SC_{81}	—	October 19, 2010	Mount Lemmon	Mount Lemmon Survey	·	1.6 km	MPC · JPL
636420	2014 SK_{81}	—	July 30, 2005	Palomar	NEAT	AEO	1.2 km	MPC · JPL
636421	2014 SU_{81}	—	July 7, 2005	Mauna Kea	Veillet, C.	·	1.0 km	MPC · JPL
636422	2014 SZ_{82}	—	August 9, 2005	Cerro Tololo	Deep Ecliptic Survey	·	1.3 km	MPC · JPL
636423	2014 SL_{84}	—	September 27, 2005	Kitt Peak	Spacewatch	·	1.4 km	MPC · JPL
636424	2014 SL_{85}	—	June 13, 2005	Mount Lemmon	Mount Lemmon Survey	MIS	2.1 km	MPC · JPL
636425	2014 SZ_{86}	—	June 12, 2013	Haleakala	Pan-STARRS 1	MRX	850 m	MPC · JPL
636426	2014 SX_{91}	—	September 18, 2014	Haleakala	Pan-STARRS 1	·	1.3 km	MPC · JPL
636427	2014 SE_{92}	—	March 31, 2008	Mount Lemmon	Mount Lemmon Survey	·	1.6 km	MPC · JPL
636428	2014 SJ_{92}	—	April 12, 2002	Kitt Peak	Spacewatch	·	1.7 km	MPC · JPL
636429	2014 SN_{95}	—	November 13, 2010	Mount Lemmon	Mount Lemmon Survey	MRX	980 m	MPC · JPL
636430	2014 SZ_{95}	—	August 29, 2014	Kitt Peak	Spacewatch	·	1.8 km	MPC · JPL
636431	2014 SH_{97}	—	March 10, 2008	Kitt Peak	Spacewatch	·	1.4 km	MPC · JPL
636432	2014 SN_{97}	—	August 31, 2005	Kitt Peak	Spacewatch	·	1.6 km	MPC · JPL
636433	2014 SS_{97}	—	September 18, 2014	Haleakala	Pan-STARRS 1	·	1.4 km	MPC · JPL
636434	2014 ST_{98}	—	January 30, 2006	Kitt Peak	Spacewatch	·	2.4 km	MPC · JPL
636435	2014 SM_{100}	—	January 18, 2008	Kitt Peak	Spacewatch	·	1.0 km	MPC · JPL
636436	2014 SU_{100}	—	September 18, 2014	Haleakala	Pan-STARRS 1	·	1.4 km	MPC · JPL
636437	2014 SG_{102}	—	September 27, 2003	Kitt Peak	Spacewatch	THM	2.1 km	MPC · JPL
636438	2014 SL_{105}	—	December 6, 2005	Kitt Peak	Spacewatch	·	2.0 km	MPC · JPL
636439	2014 SM_{111}	—	August 28, 2000	Cerro Tololo	Deep Ecliptic Survey	·	1.4 km	MPC · JPL
636440	2014 SM_{113}	—	February 25, 2012	Mount Lemmon	Mount Lemmon Survey	·	1.7 km	MPC · JPL
636441	2014 SM_{115}	—	January 13, 2005	Kitt Peak	Spacewatch	·	2.9 km	MPC · JPL
636442	2014 SD_{117}	—	September 18, 2014	Haleakala	Pan-STARRS 1	·	1.6 km	MPC · JPL
636443	2014 SR_{119}	—	October 1, 2005	Mount Lemmon	Mount Lemmon Survey	·	1.5 km	MPC · JPL
636444	2014 SX_{120}	—	March 6, 2002	Palomar	NEAT	·	1.7 km	MPC · JPL
636445	2014 SG_{124}	—	August 12, 2004	Cerro Tololo	Deep Ecliptic Survey	KOR	1.4 km	MPC · JPL
636446	2014 ST_{132}	—	October 1, 2005	Mount Lemmon	Mount Lemmon Survey	·	1.5 km	MPC · JPL
636447	2014 SN_{133}	—	February 26, 2012	Mount Lemmon	Mount Lemmon Survey	HOF	2.1 km	MPC · JPL
636448	2014 SG_{140}	—	November 10, 2004	Kitt Peak	Spacewatch	·	1.5 km	MPC · JPL
636449	2014 SG_{146}	—	June 4, 2013	Mount Lemmon	Mount Lemmon Survey	·	1.4 km	MPC · JPL
636450	2014 SB_{148}	—	September 18, 2003	Palomar	NEAT	EOS	2.3 km	MPC · JPL
636451	2014 SU_{149}	—	December 21, 2006	Mount Lemmon	Mount Lemmon Survey	PAD	1.4 km	MPC · JPL
636452	2014 SN_{150}	—	January 22, 2012	Haleakala	Pan-STARRS 1	(5)	1.1 km	MPC · JPL
636453	2014 SF_{153}	—	February 12, 2002	Kitt Peak	Spacewatch	·	1.6 km	MPC · JPL
636454	2014 SF_{154}	—	November 1, 2005	Mount Lemmon	Mount Lemmon Survey	·	1.7 km	MPC · JPL
636455	2014 SM_{155}	—	September 24, 2009	Mount Lemmon	Mount Lemmon Survey	·	2.0 km	MPC · JPL
636456	2014 SX_{156}	—	November 12, 2010	Mount Lemmon	Mount Lemmon Survey	JUN	930 m	MPC · JPL
636457	2014 SM_{159}	—	September 19, 2014	Haleakala	Pan-STARRS 1	·	1.8 km	MPC · JPL
636458	2014 SZ_{161}	—	November 13, 2010	ESA OGS	ESA OGS	·	1.6 km	MPC · JPL
636459	2014 SF_{162}	—	September 11, 2010	Mount Lemmon	Mount Lemmon Survey	·	1.4 km	MPC · JPL
636460	2014 SP_{163}	—	September 26, 2003	Apache Point	SDSS	·	3.0 km	MPC · JPL
636461	2014 SY_{165}	—	November 10, 2009	Mount Lemmon	Mount Lemmon Survey	EOS	2.1 km	MPC · JPL
636462	2014 SY_{171}	—	August 27, 2014	Haleakala	Pan-STARRS 1	·	1.1 km	MPC · JPL
636463	2014 SR_{176}	—	November 6, 2010	Kitt Peak	Spacewatch	·	1.8 km	MPC · JPL
636464	2014 SH_{179}	—	September 16, 2009	Kitt Peak	Spacewatch	·	1.3 km	MPC · JPL
636465	2014 SE_{180}	—	September 1, 2005	Kitt Peak	Spacewatch	·	1.2 km	MPC · JPL
636466	2014 SH_{182}	—	September 5, 2000	Kitt Peak	Spacewatch	·	1.9 km	MPC · JPL
636467	2014 SH_{184}	—	September 5, 2010	Mount Lemmon	Mount Lemmon Survey	·	1.3 km	MPC · JPL
636468	2014 ST_{187}	—	October 22, 2003	Apache Point	SDSS	VER	2.7 km	MPC · JPL
636469	2014 SJ_{193}	—	May 3, 2008	Mount Lemmon	Mount Lemmon Survey	·	1.7 km	MPC · JPL
636470	2014 SY_{195}	—	April 1, 2008	Mount Lemmon	Mount Lemmon Survey	·	1.6 km	MPC · JPL
636471	2014 SF_{198}	—	February 16, 2012	Haleakala	Pan-STARRS 1	·	1.8 km	MPC · JPL
636472	2014 SB_{206}	—	January 27, 2011	Mount Lemmon	Mount Lemmon Survey	·	2.7 km	MPC · JPL
636473	2014 SU_{212}	—	September 25, 2003	Palomar	NEAT	·	3.3 km	MPC · JPL
636474	2014 SK_{221}	—	August 6, 2005	Palomar	NEAT	·	1.7 km	MPC · JPL
636475	2014 SE_{228}	—	November 25, 2005	Kitt Peak	Spacewatch	KOR	1.1 km	MPC · JPL
636476	2014 SZ_{228}	—	December 19, 2004	Mount Lemmon	Mount Lemmon Survey	·	2.6 km	MPC · JPL
636477	2014 SK_{232}	—	September 19, 2014	Haleakala	Pan-STARRS 1	·	2.9 km	MPC · JPL
636478	2014 ST_{236}	—	January 19, 2012	Haleakala	Pan-STARRS 1	·	1.3 km	MPC · JPL
636479	2014 SD_{237}	—	September 20, 2014	Haleakala	Pan-STARRS 1	·	1.4 km	MPC · JPL
636480	2014 SR_{239}	—	September 16, 2006	Catalina	CSS	·	1.5 km	MPC · JPL
636481	2014 SB_{244}	—	July 31, 2014	Haleakala	Pan-STARRS 1	·	1.5 km	MPC · JPL
636482	2014 SJ_{250}	—	May 29, 2013	Mount Lemmon	Mount Lemmon Survey	DOR	2.2 km	MPC · JPL
636483	2014 SO_{257}	—	August 20, 2009	Kitt Peak	Spacewatch	KOR	1.4 km	MPC · JPL
636484	2014 SE_{266}	—	November 7, 2010	Mount Lemmon	Mount Lemmon Survey	EOS	2.5 km	MPC · JPL
636485	2014 ST_{271}	—	January 27, 2012	Mount Lemmon	Mount Lemmon Survey	·	1.3 km	MPC · JPL
636486	2014 SL_{274}	—	March 13, 2008	Kitt Peak	Spacewatch	·	1.3 km	MPC · JPL
636487	2014 SO_{279}	—	September 22, 2014	Kitt Peak	Spacewatch	·	1.7 km	MPC · JPL
636488	2014 SG_{288}	—	October 22, 2005	Kitt Peak	Spacewatch	·	1.9 km	MPC · JPL
636489	2014 SH_{289}	—	September 14, 2014	Mount Lemmon	Mount Lemmon Survey	·	3.1 km	MPC · JPL
636490	2014 SJ_{293}	—	November 4, 2004	Kitt Peak	Spacewatch	·	3.6 km	MPC · JPL
636491	2014 SG_{295}	—	May 28, 2014	Haleakala	Pan-STARRS 1	·	3.4 km	MPC · JPL
636492	2014 SV_{299}	—	June 9, 2012	Mount Lemmon	Mount Lemmon Survey	·	3.5 km	MPC · JPL
636493	2014 SO_{304}	—	March 20, 2002	Kitt Peak	Deep Ecliptic Survey	·	2.0 km	MPC · JPL
636494	2014 SU_{307}	—	March 5, 2006	Kitt Peak	Spacewatch	EOS	1.7 km	MPC · JPL
636495	2014 SE_{308}	—	September 20, 2009	Kitt Peak	Spacewatch	AGN	1.1 km	MPC · JPL
636496	2014 SF_{308}	—	October 22, 2005	Kitt Peak	Spacewatch	·	1.8 km	MPC · JPL
636497	2014 SV_{310}	—	August 30, 2014	Haleakala	Pan-STARRS 1	·	3.2 km	MPC · JPL
636498	2014 SA_{312}	—	September 21, 2009	Mount Lemmon	Mount Lemmon Survey	EOS	1.7 km	MPC · JPL
636499	2014 SY_{315}	—	September 26, 2014	Kitt Peak	Spacewatch	·	1.5 km	MPC · JPL
636500	2014 SW_{321}	—	September 6, 2014	Mount Lemmon	Mount Lemmon Survey	·	1.7 km	MPC · JPL

== 636501–636600 ==
back to top

Designation			Discovery			Properties		Ref
Permanent	Provisional	Named after	Date	Site	Discoverer(s)	Category	Diam.	Ref
636501	2014 SZ_{324}	—	May 8, 2013	Haleakala	Pan-STARRS 1	·	1.5 km	MPC · JPL
636502	2014 SK_{325}	—	January 30, 2006	Kitt Peak	Spacewatch	·	2.2 km	MPC · JPL
636503	2014 SK_{326}	—	September 26, 2008	La Cañada	Lacruz, J.	·	2.9 km	MPC · JPL
636504	2014 SV_{326}	—	June 12, 2013	Haleakala	Pan-STARRS 1	HOF	2.1 km	MPC · JPL
636505	2014 SC_{331}	—	October 1, 1995	Kitt Peak	Spacewatch	KOR	1.1 km	MPC · JPL
636506	2014 SE_{331}	—	April 5, 2011	Mount Lemmon	Mount Lemmon Survey	·	2.5 km	MPC · JPL
636507	2014 SG_{331}	—	September 29, 2014	Haleakala	Pan-STARRS 1	·	1.4 km	MPC · JPL
636508	2014 SH_{334}	—	April 13, 2008	Mount Lemmon	Mount Lemmon Survey	(13314)	2.0 km	MPC · JPL
636509	2014 SL_{336}	—	September 24, 2009	Mount Lemmon	Mount Lemmon Survey	KOR	1.3 km	MPC · JPL
636510	2014 SP_{341}	—	September 19, 2014	Haleakala	Pan-STARRS 1	·	1.5 km	MPC · JPL
636511	2014 SF_{342}	—	February 28, 2008	Kitt Peak	Spacewatch	·	1.6 km	MPC · JPL
636512	2014 SV_{343}	—	March 12, 2007	Kitt Peak	Spacewatch	·	2.1 km	MPC · JPL
636513	2014 SH_{344}	—	November 15, 1998	Kitt Peak	Spacewatch	·	2.6 km	MPC · JPL
636514	2014 SW_{346}	—	September 24, 2005	Kitt Peak	Spacewatch	·	1.4 km	MPC · JPL
636515	2014 SC_{353}	—	September 27, 2003	Kitt Peak	Spacewatch	HYG	2.5 km	MPC · JPL
636516	2014 SR_{353}	—	September 25, 2014	Kitt Peak	Spacewatch	HOF	1.9 km	MPC · JPL
636517	2014 ST_{354}	—	March 8, 2008	Mount Lemmon	Mount Lemmon Survey	·	1.7 km	MPC · JPL
636518	2014 SL_{355}	—	April 16, 2013	Calar Alto	F. Hormuth	·	1.1 km	MPC · JPL
636519	2014 SG_{356}	—	May 26, 2007	Mount Lemmon	Mount Lemmon Survey	HYG	2.7 km	MPC · JPL
636520	2014 SH_{356}	—	September 20, 2014	Haleakala	Pan-STARRS 1	·	2.0 km	MPC · JPL
636521	2014 SZ_{357}	—	September 14, 2014	Mount Lemmon	Mount Lemmon Survey	AGN	1.1 km	MPC · JPL
636522	2014 SW_{358}	—	October 1, 2005	Mount Lemmon	Mount Lemmon Survey	·	1.7 km	MPC · JPL
636523	2014 SS_{361}	—	September 23, 2014	ESA OGS	ESA OGS	·	1.6 km	MPC · JPL
636524	2014 SX_{379}	—	September 23, 2014	Haleakala	Pan-STARRS 1	HOF	2.1 km	MPC · JPL
636525	2014 SZ_{379}	—	September 19, 2014	Haleakala	Pan-STARRS 1	VER	1.9 km	MPC · JPL
636526	2014 SJ_{380}	—	September 18, 2014	Haleakala	Pan-STARRS 1	·	1.3 km	MPC · JPL
636527	2014 SR_{384}	—	October 2, 2013	Haleakala	Pan-STARRS 1	L5	7.4 km	MPC · JPL
636528	2014 SN_{395}	—	September 19, 2014	Haleakala	Pan-STARRS 1	(29841)	1.2 km	MPC · JPL
636529	2014 SY_{408}	—	September 20, 2014	Haleakala	Pan-STARRS 1	·	1.3 km	MPC · JPL
636530	2014 SL_{416}	—	May 12, 2013	Mount Lemmon	Mount Lemmon Survey	·	1.4 km	MPC · JPL
636531	2014 TL_{2}	—	October 5, 2003	Kitt Peak	Spacewatch	·	3.4 km	MPC · JPL
636532	2014 TH_{11}	—	September 12, 2002	Palomar	NEAT	·	3.8 km	MPC · JPL
636533	2014 TS_{12}	—	September 19, 2009	Kitt Peak	Spacewatch	·	1.5 km	MPC · JPL
636534	2014 TV_{14}	—	February 8, 2011	Dauban	C. Rinner, Kugel, F.	EOS	1.7 km	MPC · JPL
636535	2014 TV_{15}	—	October 17, 2003	Apache Point	SDSS	EOS	2.1 km	MPC · JPL
636536	2014 TV_{21}	—	December 27, 2006	Mount Lemmon	Mount Lemmon Survey	·	1.3 km	MPC · JPL
636537	2014 TO_{29}	—	October 18, 2009	Mount Lemmon	Mount Lemmon Survey	·	1.8 km	MPC · JPL
636538	2014 TZ_{31}	—	April 14, 2008	Kitt Peak	Spacewatch	·	1.5 km	MPC · JPL
636539	2014 TD_{32}	—	December 3, 2010	Mount Lemmon	Mount Lemmon Survey	·	1.6 km	MPC · JPL
636540	2014 TL_{32}	—	March 13, 2012	Mount Lemmon	Mount Lemmon Survey	·	940 m	MPC · JPL
636541	2014 TG_{36}	—	September 23, 2014	Mount Lemmon	Mount Lemmon Survey	·	2.8 km	MPC · JPL
636542	2014 TC_{39}	—	October 25, 2003	Socorro	LINEAR	TIR	3.0 km	MPC · JPL
636543	2014 TA_{43}	—	March 30, 2008	Kitt Peak	Spacewatch	·	2.2 km	MPC · JPL
636544	2014 TP_{44}	—	September 19, 2009	Mount Lemmon	Mount Lemmon Survey	HOF	2.0 km	MPC · JPL
636545	2014 TH_{45}	—	September 30, 2003	Kitt Peak	Spacewatch	·	1.1 km	MPC · JPL
636546	2014 TA_{46}	—	September 27, 2009	Mount Lemmon	Mount Lemmon Survey	·	1.9 km	MPC · JPL
636547	2014 TY_{49}	—	September 19, 2014	Haleakala	Pan-STARRS 1	·	1.3 km	MPC · JPL
636548	2014 TU_{63}	—	January 28, 2011	Mount Lemmon	Mount Lemmon Survey	·	1.5 km	MPC · JPL
636549	2014 TY_{63}	—	March 8, 2008	Kitt Peak	Spacewatch	·	2.3 km	MPC · JPL
636550	2014 TV_{66}	—	September 18, 2009	Kitt Peak	Spacewatch	·	2.1 km	MPC · JPL
636551	2014 TC_{76}	—	October 14, 2014	Mount Lemmon	Mount Lemmon Survey	·	2.1 km	MPC · JPL
636552	2014 TL_{79}	—	January 31, 2008	Mount Lemmon	Mount Lemmon Survey	·	2.4 km	MPC · JPL
636553	2014 TS_{79}	—	December 26, 2006	Kitt Peak	Spacewatch	·	1.2 km	MPC · JPL
636554	2014 TN_{80}	—	July 3, 2008	Mount Lemmon	Mount Lemmon Survey	EOS	2.4 km	MPC · JPL
636555	2014 TN_{81}	—	November 10, 2009	Mount Lemmon	Mount Lemmon Survey	EOS	1.5 km	MPC · JPL
636556	2014 TR_{87}	—	August 16, 2009	La Sagra	OAM	·	2.1 km	MPC · JPL
636557	2014 TT_{87}	—	September 30, 2003	Kitt Peak	Spacewatch	·	2.5 km	MPC · JPL
636558	2014 TB_{88}	—	February 7, 2006	Kitt Peak	Spacewatch	·	3.5 km	MPC · JPL
636559	2014 TM_{90}	—	October 1, 2014	Haleakala	Pan-STARRS 1	·	1.6 km	MPC · JPL
636560	2014 TO_{91}	—	August 27, 2009	Catalina	CSS	DOR	2.2 km	MPC · JPL
636561	2014 TR_{92}	—	September 30, 2003	Kitt Peak	Spacewatch	·	2.1 km	MPC · JPL
636562	2014 TS_{92}	—	October 2, 2014	Haleakala	Pan-STARRS 1	·	1.6 km	MPC · JPL
636563	2014 TD_{94}	—	February 5, 2011	Haleakala	Pan-STARRS 1	·	2.9 km	MPC · JPL
636564	2014 TB_{103}	—	October 1, 2014	Haleakala	Pan-STARRS 1	·	1.7 km	MPC · JPL
636565	2014 UC_{1}	—	August 8, 2008	La Sagra	OAM	·	1.7 km	MPC · JPL
636566	2014 UB_{3}	—	October 3, 2014	Mount Lemmon	Mount Lemmon Survey	·	3.4 km	MPC · JPL
636567	2014 UE_{5}	—	May 21, 2006	Mount Lemmon	Mount Lemmon Survey	V	620 m	MPC · JPL
636568	2014 UR_{12}	—	February 26, 2012	La Palma	La Palma	·	1.7 km	MPC · JPL
636569	2014 UT_{12}	—	July 8, 2003	Palomar	NEAT	·	2.3 km	MPC · JPL
636570	2014 UY_{18}	—	October 4, 2008	La Sagra	OAM	·	3.2 km	MPC · JPL
636571	2014 UV_{20}	—	November 19, 2003	Palomar	NEAT	·	3.6 km	MPC · JPL
636572	2014 UJ_{21}	—	July 20, 2004	Siding Spring	SSS	·	2.1 km	MPC · JPL
636573	2014 UB_{22}	—	September 20, 2003	Kitt Peak	Spacewatch	V	550 m	MPC · JPL
636574	2014 UF_{39}	—	February 1, 2006	Kitt Peak	Spacewatch	·	2.3 km	MPC · JPL
636575	2014 UP_{41}	—	February 27, 2006	Kitt Peak	Spacewatch	L5	8.0 km	MPC · JPL
636576	2014 UW_{44}	—	May 24, 2007	Mount Lemmon	Mount Lemmon Survey	·	2.3 km	MPC · JPL
636577	2014 UB_{45}	—	September 21, 2003	Palomar	NEAT	·	1.0 km	MPC · JPL
636578	2014 UT_{45}	—	October 1, 2003	Kitt Peak	Spacewatch	·	2.7 km	MPC · JPL
636579	2014 UM_{61}	—	March 13, 2012	Kitt Peak	Spacewatch	AGN	1 km	MPC · JPL
636580	2014 UJ_{63}	—	April 1, 2012	Mount Lemmon	Mount Lemmon Survey	KOR	1.1 km	MPC · JPL
636581	2014 UQ_{63}	—	November 23, 2009	Mount Lemmon	Mount Lemmon Survey	·	2.3 km	MPC · JPL
636582	2014 UA_{64}	—	March 27, 2003	Anderson Mesa	LONEOS	(13314)	2.6 km	MPC · JPL
636583	2014 UJ_{65}	—	February 22, 2007	Kitt Peak	Spacewatch	HOF	2.3 km	MPC · JPL
636584	2014 UP_{66}	—	November 19, 2001	Socorro	LINEAR	·	1.4 km	MPC · JPL
636585	2014 UG_{70}	—	April 20, 2012	Mount Lemmon	Mount Lemmon Survey	·	1.6 km	MPC · JPL
636586	2014 UX_{71}	—	September 23, 2008	Mount Lemmon	Mount Lemmon Survey	HYG	2.9 km	MPC · JPL
636587	2014 UF_{72}	—	September 9, 2008	Mount Lemmon	Mount Lemmon Survey	·	2.3 km	MPC · JPL
636588	2014 UV_{72}	—	September 25, 2009	Kitt Peak	Spacewatch	·	1.9 km	MPC · JPL
636589	2014 UN_{73}	—	March 1, 2012	Mount Lemmon	Mount Lemmon Survey	·	1.2 km	MPC · JPL
636590	2014 UW_{73}	—	September 24, 2014	Kitt Peak	Spacewatch	·	2.0 km	MPC · JPL
636591	2014 UU_{74}	—	March 28, 2012	Mount Lemmon	Mount Lemmon Survey	KOR	1.0 km	MPC · JPL
636592	2014 UV_{74}	—	March 15, 2012	Mount Lemmon	Mount Lemmon Survey	·	1.4 km	MPC · JPL
636593	2014 US_{77}	—	October 21, 2014	Mount Lemmon	Mount Lemmon Survey	·	1.5 km	MPC · JPL
636594	2014 UD_{79}	—	October 25, 2005	Mount Lemmon	Mount Lemmon Survey	·	1.7 km	MPC · JPL
636595	2014 UB_{85}	—	December 1, 2005	Mount Lemmon	Mount Lemmon Survey	·	980 m	MPC · JPL
636596	2014 UM_{88}	—	March 23, 2002	Socorro	LINEAR	(2076)	990 m	MPC · JPL
636597	2014 UO_{89}	—	October 19, 2003	Kitt Peak	Spacewatch	·	2.6 km	MPC · JPL
636598	2014 UG_{97}	—	February 9, 2007	Kitt Peak	Spacewatch	·	1.3 km	MPC · JPL
636599	2014 UW_{104}	—	April 22, 2004	Kitt Peak	Spacewatch	·	1.6 km	MPC · JPL
636600	2014 UF_{113}	—	September 22, 1995	Kitt Peak	Spacewatch	·	1.6 km	MPC · JPL

== 636601–636700 ==
back to top

Designation			Discovery			Properties		Ref
Permanent	Provisional	Named after	Date	Site	Discoverer(s)	Category	Diam.	Ref
636601	2014 US_{119}	—	October 7, 2004	Kitt Peak	Spacewatch	KOR	1.4 km	MPC · JPL
636602	2014 UG_{128}	—	July 20, 2002	Palomar	NEAT	·	3.3 km	MPC · JPL
636603	2014 UX_{129}	—	February 25, 2007	Mount Lemmon	Mount Lemmon Survey	·	1.6 km	MPC · JPL
636604	2014 UU_{133}	—	August 27, 2009	Kitt Peak	Spacewatch	MRX	940 m	MPC · JPL
636605	2014 UM_{139}	—	October 25, 2014	Kitt Peak	Spacewatch	·	1.9 km	MPC · JPL
636606	2014 UZ_{140}	—	November 25, 2005	Mount Lemmon	Mount Lemmon Survey	·	1.7 km	MPC · JPL
636607	2014 UP_{141}	—	March 29, 2012	Kitt Peak	Spacewatch	JUN	920 m	MPC · JPL
636608	2014 UR_{141}	—	February 20, 2002	Kitt Peak	Spacewatch	·	800 m	MPC · JPL
636609	2014 UK_{150}	—	October 25, 2014	Mount Lemmon	Mount Lemmon Survey	·	1.5 km	MPC · JPL
636610	2014 UV_{151}	—	March 9, 2000	Kitt Peak	Spacewatch	VER	2.8 km	MPC · JPL
636611	2014 UZ_{152}	—	December 29, 2005	Mount Lemmon	Mount Lemmon Survey	AGN	960 m	MPC · JPL
636612	2014 UN_{153}	—	September 16, 2003	Kitt Peak	Spacewatch	·	3.2 km	MPC · JPL
636613	2014 UY_{153}	—	May 2, 2008	Kitt Peak	Spacewatch	·	2.1 km	MPC · JPL
636614	2014 UL_{154}	—	September 18, 2003	Kitt Peak	Spacewatch	EOS	1.6 km	MPC · JPL
636615	2014 UK_{155}	—	November 2, 2010	Kitt Peak	Spacewatch	·	1.9 km	MPC · JPL
636616	2014 UB_{158}	—	July 29, 2008	Mount Lemmon	Mount Lemmon Survey	·	2.4 km	MPC · JPL
636617	2014 UY_{161}	—	April 1, 2008	Kitt Peak	Spacewatch	·	1.9 km	MPC · JPL
636618	2014 UA_{162}	—	January 25, 2006	Kitt Peak	Spacewatch	KOR	1.3 km	MPC · JPL
636619	2014 UZ_{163}	—	October 21, 2014	Kitt Peak	Spacewatch	·	1.9 km	MPC · JPL
636620	2014 UQ_{165}	—	October 26, 2014	Mount Lemmon	Mount Lemmon Survey	·	2.2 km	MPC · JPL
636621	2014 UO_{169}	—	June 9, 2012	Mount Lemmon	Mount Lemmon Survey	EOS	2.2 km	MPC · JPL
636622	2014 UO_{172}	—	February 28, 2006	Mount Lemmon	Mount Lemmon Survey	·	2.9 km	MPC · JPL
636623	2014 UH_{180}	—	March 26, 2007	Kitt Peak	Spacewatch	·	1.8 km	MPC · JPL
636624	2014 UK_{186}	—	July 16, 2013	Haleakala	Pan-STARRS 1	ADE	1.9 km	MPC · JPL
636625	2014 UM_{190}	—	April 9, 2005	Mount Lemmon	Mount Lemmon Survey	·	2.4 km	MPC · JPL
636626	2014 UA_{198}	—	September 28, 2003	Kitt Peak	Spacewatch	·	2.7 km	MPC · JPL
636627	2014 UA_{201}	—	September 11, 2010	Kitt Peak	Spacewatch	PHO	840 m	MPC · JPL
636628	2014 UG_{202}	—	October 29, 2005	Mount Lemmon	Mount Lemmon Survey	HOF	2.0 km	MPC · JPL
636629	2014 UN_{202}	—	August 28, 2009	La Sagra	OAM	·	1.9 km	MPC · JPL
636630	2014 UA_{208}	—	March 24, 2012	Catalina	CSS	·	2.2 km	MPC · JPL
636631	2014 UL_{208}	—	September 29, 2001	Palomar	NEAT	·	2.2 km	MPC · JPL
636632	2014 UB_{212}	—	April 20, 2012	Mount Lemmon	Mount Lemmon Survey	·	3.1 km	MPC · JPL
636633	2014 UU_{212}	—	March 13, 2008	Kitt Peak	Spacewatch	·	2.1 km	MPC · JPL
636634	2014 UF_{214}	—	February 8, 2011	Mount Lemmon	Mount Lemmon Survey	·	2.2 km	MPC · JPL
636635	2014 UW_{214}	—	April 26, 2007	Mount Lemmon	Mount Lemmon Survey	LIX	3.6 km	MPC · JPL
636636	2014 UT_{220}	—	December 5, 2010	Mount Lemmon	Mount Lemmon Survey	·	2.9 km	MPC · JPL
636637	2014 UN_{222}	—	March 16, 2012	Haleakala	Pan-STARRS 1	·	1.7 km	MPC · JPL
636638	2014 UQ_{225}	—	April 24, 2009	Cerro Burek	Burek, Cerro	L5	7.6 km	MPC · JPL
636639	2014 UD_{230}	—	September 25, 2009	Kitt Peak	Spacewatch	AGN	980 m	MPC · JPL
636640	2014 UN_{230}	—	October 25, 2014	Haleakala	Pan-STARRS 1	·	1.6 km	MPC · JPL
636641	2014 UR_{230}	—	October 18, 2014	Mount Lemmon	Mount Lemmon Survey	MRX	1.1 km	MPC · JPL
636642	2014 US_{231}	—	September 28, 2009	Mount Lemmon	Mount Lemmon Survey	·	1.4 km	MPC · JPL
636643	2014 UT_{231}	—	October 16, 2009	Mount Lemmon	Mount Lemmon Survey	·	1.7 km	MPC · JPL
636644	2014 UX_{232}	—	October 13, 2014	Mount Lemmon	Mount Lemmon Survey	·	2.5 km	MPC · JPL
636645	2014 UJ_{233}	—	February 7, 2011	Mount Lemmon	Mount Lemmon Survey	·	1.6 km	MPC · JPL
636646	2014 UA_{237}	—	November 18, 2009	Kitt Peak	Spacewatch	TEL	1.4 km	MPC · JPL
636647	2014 UD_{255}	—	October 21, 2014	Mount Lemmon	Mount Lemmon Survey	·	1.3 km	MPC · JPL
636648	2014 UU_{257}	—	October 2, 2014	Kitt Peak	Spacewatch	·	1.5 km	MPC · JPL
636649	2014 VQ_{3}	—	July 21, 2002	Palomar	NEAT	VER	3.5 km	MPC · JPL
636650	2014 VK_{13}	—	October 16, 1977	Palomar	C. J. van Houten, I. van Houten-Groeneveld, T. Gehrels	·	2.3 km	MPC · JPL
636651	2014 VK_{16}	—	November 14, 2014	Kitt Peak	Spacewatch	·	1.8 km	MPC · JPL
636652	2014 VJ_{19}	—	August 27, 2009	Kitt Peak	Spacewatch	·	1.6 km	MPC · JPL
636653	2014 VB_{26}	—	September 17, 2012	Nogales	M. Schwartz, P. R. Holvorcem	L5	10 km	MPC · JPL
636654	2014 VR_{29}	—	September 18, 2009	Kitt Peak	Spacewatch	·	1.4 km	MPC · JPL
636655	2014 VR_{30}	—	April 7, 2007	Mount Lemmon	Mount Lemmon Survey	·	1.6 km	MPC · JPL
636656	2014 VK_{35}	—	October 8, 2004	Kitt Peak	Spacewatch	KOR	1.2 km	MPC · JPL
636657	2014 VL_{36}	—	April 4, 2007	Palomar	NEAT	·	2.3 km	MPC · JPL
636658	2014 WB	—	February 9, 2005	La Silla	A. Boattini	L5	10 km	MPC · JPL
636659	2014 WV	—	November 16, 2014	Mount Lemmon	Mount Lemmon Survey	·	1.5 km	MPC · JPL
636660	2014 WH_{2}	—	October 22, 2014	Mount Lemmon	Mount Lemmon Survey	·	1.5 km	MPC · JPL
636661	2014 WJ_{9}	—	September 12, 2009	Kitt Peak	Spacewatch	AGN	1.3 km	MPC · JPL
636662	2014 WZ_{10}	—	October 24, 2014	Kitt Peak	Spacewatch	·	590 m	MPC · JPL
636663	2014 WV_{12}	—	March 10, 2007	Mount Lemmon	Mount Lemmon Survey	·	1.9 km	MPC · JPL
636664	2014 WK_{15}	—	March 15, 2012	Mount Lemmon	Mount Lemmon Survey	·	1.5 km	MPC · JPL
636665	2014 WD_{17}	—	October 24, 2009	Kitt Peak	Spacewatch	AGN	1.2 km	MPC · JPL
636666	2014 WX_{19}	—	October 30, 2005	Kitt Peak	Spacewatch	·	1.3 km	MPC · JPL
636667	2014 WM_{24}	—	April 8, 2008	Kitt Peak	Spacewatch	L5	8.3 km	MPC · JPL
636668	2014 WQ_{24}	—	December 22, 2008	Mount Lemmon	Mount Lemmon Survey	·	950 m	MPC · JPL
636669	2014 WR_{26}	—	September 26, 2009	Kitt Peak	Spacewatch	·	1.8 km	MPC · JPL
636670	2014 WZ_{27}	—	January 9, 2002	Socorro	LINEAR	·	860 m	MPC · JPL
636671	2014 WG_{28}	—	October 15, 1991	Kitt Peak	Spacewatch	·	1.3 km	MPC · JPL
636672	2014 WO_{30}	—	July 1, 2013	Haleakala	Pan-STARRS 1	KOR	1.2 km	MPC · JPL
636673	2014 WY_{35}	—	January 27, 2006	Kitt Peak	Spacewatch	·	1.6 km	MPC · JPL
636674	2014 WS_{44}	—	March 20, 2001	Kitt Peak	Spacewatch	EOS	2.6 km	MPC · JPL
636675	2014 WY_{48}	—	April 27, 2006	Cerro Tololo	Deep Ecliptic Survey	·	2.5 km	MPC · JPL
636676	2014 WZ_{48}	—	August 21, 2008	Kitt Peak	Spacewatch	·	2.7 km	MPC · JPL
636677	2014 WM_{49}	—	October 18, 2014	Mount Lemmon	Mount Lemmon Survey	·	950 m	MPC · JPL
636678	2014 WJ_{58}	—	November 17, 2014	Mount Lemmon	Mount Lemmon Survey	·	1.6 km	MPC · JPL
636679	2014 WQ_{58}	—	January 21, 2006	Kitt Peak	Spacewatch	KOR	1.4 km	MPC · JPL
636680 Lisaloring	2014 WE_{59}	Lisaloring	October 27, 2009	Mount Lemmon	Mount Lemmon Survey	·	1.7 km	MPC · JPL
636681	2014 WL_{63}	—	April 22, 2007	Mount Lemmon	Mount Lemmon Survey	·	2.0 km	MPC · JPL
636682	2014 WA_{69}	—	October 26, 2005	Kitt Peak	Spacewatch	·	1.7 km	MPC · JPL
636683	2014 WU_{76}	—	September 29, 2003	Kitt Peak	Spacewatch	·	990 m	MPC · JPL
636684	2014 WG_{80}	—	March 31, 2008	Kitt Peak	Spacewatch	·	1.8 km	MPC · JPL
636685	2014 WL_{81}	—	March 13, 2011	Mount Lemmon	Mount Lemmon Survey	·	2.6 km	MPC · JPL
636686	2014 WW_{88}	—	November 17, 2014	Mount Lemmon	Mount Lemmon Survey	PAD	1.2 km	MPC · JPL
636687	2014 WB_{102}	—	November 17, 2014	Mount Lemmon	Mount Lemmon Survey	·	1.3 km	MPC · JPL
636688	2014 WJ_{103}	—	April 20, 2012	Mount Lemmon	Mount Lemmon Survey	·	2.9 km	MPC · JPL
636689	2014 WN_{106}	—	April 21, 2006	Kitt Peak	Spacewatch	·	2.6 km	MPC · JPL
636690	2014 WV_{108}	—	February 7, 2011	Mount Lemmon	Mount Lemmon Survey	KOR	1.0 km	MPC · JPL
636691	2014 WL_{111}	—	October 25, 2014	Haleakala	Pan-STARRS 1	HOF	1.9 km	MPC · JPL
636692	2014 WJ_{112}	—	October 31, 2005	Mount Lemmon	Mount Lemmon Survey	AGN	860 m	MPC · JPL
636693	2014 WP_{112}	—	September 17, 2009	Kitt Peak	Spacewatch	·	1.4 km	MPC · JPL
636694	2014 WX_{118}	—	October 12, 2001	Haleakala	NEAT	·	1.4 km	MPC · JPL
636695	2014 WN_{120}	—	November 21, 2014	Mount Lemmon	Mount Lemmon Survey	L5	9.0 km	MPC · JPL
636696	2014 WB_{121}	—	September 20, 2009	Kitt Peak	Spacewatch	KOR	1.1 km	MPC · JPL
636697	2014 WW_{126}	—	April 15, 2012	Haleakala	Pan-STARRS 1	·	1.5 km	MPC · JPL
636698	2014 WO_{130}	—	October 21, 2014	Mount Lemmon	Mount Lemmon Survey	L5	9.5 km	MPC · JPL
636699	2014 WG_{131}	—	July 14, 2013	Haleakala	Pan-STARRS 1	KOR	1.1 km	MPC · JPL
636700	2014 WE_{132}	—	November 17, 2014	Haleakala	Pan-STARRS 1	L5	7.7 km	MPC · JPL

== 636701–636800 ==
back to top

Designation			Discovery			Properties		Ref
Permanent	Provisional	Named after	Date	Site	Discoverer(s)	Category	Diam.	Ref
636701	2014 WD_{139}	—	November 17, 2014	Haleakala	Pan-STARRS 1	·	2.0 km	MPC · JPL
636702	2014 WP_{140}	—	October 15, 2004	Mount Lemmon	Mount Lemmon Survey	KOR	1.1 km	MPC · JPL
636703	2014 WE_{141}	—	November 17, 2014	Haleakala	Pan-STARRS 1	·	1.3 km	MPC · JPL
636704	2014 WP_{144}	—	November 17, 2014	Haleakala	Pan-STARRS 1	·	610 m	MPC · JPL
636705	2014 WD_{148}	—	September 23, 2009	Mount Lemmon	Mount Lemmon Survey	·	2.1 km	MPC · JPL
636706	2014 WE_{153}	—	March 31, 2011	Haleakala	Pan-STARRS 1	VER	2.5 km	MPC · JPL
636707	2014 WJ_{153}	—	October 28, 2014	Haleakala	Pan-STARRS 1	·	1.6 km	MPC · JPL
636708	2014 WK_{157}	—	November 16, 2009	Mount Lemmon	Mount Lemmon Survey	·	1.8 km	MPC · JPL
636709	2014 WP_{157}	—	December 4, 2005	Mount Lemmon	Mount Lemmon Survey	·	1.5 km	MPC · JPL
636710	2014 WD_{159}	—	October 25, 2005	Mount Lemmon	Mount Lemmon Survey	AGN	1.1 km	MPC · JPL
636711	2014 WG_{161}	—	March 10, 2005	Mount Lemmon	Mount Lemmon Survey	·	1.9 km	MPC · JPL
636712	2014 WL_{162}	—	November 8, 2009	Mount Lemmon	Mount Lemmon Survey	·	1.5 km	MPC · JPL
636713	2014 WK_{168}	—	November 24, 2009	Kitt Peak	Spacewatch	EOS	2.0 km	MPC · JPL
636714	2014 WJ_{169}	—	October 19, 2006	Mount Lemmon	Mount Lemmon Survey	·	1.5 km	MPC · JPL
636715	2014 WN_{170}	—	January 28, 2007	Kitt Peak	Spacewatch	·	1.9 km	MPC · JPL
636716	2014 WL_{173}	—	January 31, 2006	Mount Lemmon	Mount Lemmon Survey	·	2.6 km	MPC · JPL
636717	2014 WR_{174}	—	October 1, 2005	Kitt Peak	Spacewatch	·	1.7 km	MPC · JPL
636718	2014 WX_{174}	—	November 27, 2009	Mount Lemmon	Mount Lemmon Survey	·	2.7 km	MPC · JPL
636719	2014 WW_{178}	—	August 31, 2013	Haleakala	Pan-STARRS 1	·	1.6 km	MPC · JPL
636720	2014 WX_{178}	—	February 8, 2011	Mount Lemmon	Mount Lemmon Survey	·	1.6 km	MPC · JPL
636721	2014 WU_{179}	—	October 22, 2003	Kitt Peak	Spacewatch	·	3.0 km	MPC · JPL
636722	2014 WG_{181}	—	February 28, 2012	Haleakala	Pan-STARRS 1	KOR	1.1 km	MPC · JPL
636723	2014 WY_{181}	—	May 11, 2007	Mount Lemmon	Mount Lemmon Survey	·	3.3 km	MPC · JPL
636724	2014 WP_{182}	—	April 14, 2007	Kitt Peak	Spacewatch	THM	2.5 km	MPC · JPL
636725	2014 WA_{187}	—	September 19, 2009	Mount Lemmon	Mount Lemmon Survey	·	1.4 km	MPC · JPL
636726	2014 WW_{189}	—	September 6, 2008	Mount Lemmon	Mount Lemmon Survey	·	2.3 km	MPC · JPL
636727	2014 WP_{195}	—	August 28, 2002	Palomar	NEAT	·	3.8 km	MPC · JPL
636728	2014 WS_{205}	—	September 21, 2009	Mount Lemmon	Mount Lemmon Survey	KOR	1.2 km	MPC · JPL
636729	2014 WY_{211}	—	October 25, 2014	Mount Lemmon	Mount Lemmon Survey	·	1.7 km	MPC · JPL
636730	2014 WZ_{213}	—	October 28, 2014	Haleakala	Pan-STARRS 1	·	1.7 km	MPC · JPL
636731	2014 WG_{215}	—	October 28, 2014	Haleakala	Pan-STARRS 1	AGN	950 m	MPC · JPL
636732	2014 WY_{215}	—	November 10, 2009	Kitt Peak	Spacewatch	·	3.5 km	MPC · JPL
636733	2014 WB_{218}	—	September 15, 2009	Kitt Peak	Spacewatch	(21344)	1.6 km	MPC · JPL
636734	2014 WU_{219}	—	December 24, 2005	Kitt Peak	Spacewatch	·	1.9 km	MPC · JPL
636735	2014 WJ_{220}	—	October 1, 2005	Mount Lemmon	Mount Lemmon Survey	·	1.8 km	MPC · JPL
636736	2014 WZ_{221}	—	November 12, 2005	Kitt Peak	Spacewatch	·	1.4 km	MPC · JPL
636737	2014 WY_{222}	—	July 14, 2013	Haleakala	Pan-STARRS 1	·	1.5 km	MPC · JPL
636738	2014 WA_{224}	—	February 3, 2009	Kitt Peak	Spacewatch	·	520 m	MPC · JPL
636739	2014 WK_{225}	—	October 3, 2013	Mount Lemmon	Mount Lemmon Survey	L5	7.0 km	MPC · JPL
636740	2014 WK_{228}	—	March 16, 2007	Mount Lemmon	Mount Lemmon Survey	·	1.3 km	MPC · JPL
636741	2014 WO_{228}	—	November 3, 2005	Kitt Peak	Spacewatch	·	990 m	MPC · JPL
636742	2014 WW_{228}	—	January 27, 2011	Mount Lemmon	Mount Lemmon Survey	AGN	870 m	MPC · JPL
636743	2014 WX_{228}	—	January 7, 2006	Mount Lemmon	Mount Lemmon Survey	KOR	1.3 km	MPC · JPL
636744	2014 WA_{229}	—	June 19, 2010	Mount Lemmon	Mount Lemmon Survey	·	630 m	MPC · JPL
636745	2014 WH_{229}	—	September 18, 2003	Anderson Mesa	LONEOS	·	1.3 km	MPC · JPL
636746	2014 WR_{242}	—	September 1, 2005	Palomar	NEAT	GEF	1.2 km	MPC · JPL
636747	2014 WD_{251}	—	April 15, 1996	Kitt Peak	Spacewatch	·	3.1 km	MPC · JPL
636748	2014 WM_{253}	—	February 21, 2007	Kitt Peak	Spacewatch	·	1.8 km	MPC · JPL
636749	2014 WO_{255}	—	December 19, 2004	Mount Lemmon	Mount Lemmon Survey	·	3.1 km	MPC · JPL
636750	2014 WF_{257}	—	March 27, 2012	Mount Lemmon	Mount Lemmon Survey	·	2.1 km	MPC · JPL
636751	2014 WK_{259}	—	January 8, 2011	Mount Lemmon	Mount Lemmon Survey	·	1.4 km	MPC · JPL
636752	2014 WR_{259}	—	September 21, 2009	Kitt Peak	Spacewatch	AGN	920 m	MPC · JPL
636753	2014 WV_{260}	—	July 30, 2008	Mount Lemmon	Mount Lemmon Survey	·	1.6 km	MPC · JPL
636754	2014 WE_{263}	—	March 5, 2011	Dauban	C. Rinner, Kugel, F.	·	2.4 km	MPC · JPL
636755	2014 WN_{263}	—	September 29, 2003	Kitt Peak	Spacewatch	·	1.6 km	MPC · JPL
636756	2014 WW_{266}	—	February 8, 2011	Mount Lemmon	Mount Lemmon Survey	·	1.6 km	MPC · JPL
636757	2014 WS_{268}	—	February 10, 2011	Mount Lemmon	Mount Lemmon Survey	·	1.6 km	MPC · JPL
636758	2014 WH_{271}	—	September 23, 2008	Kitt Peak	Spacewatch	·	2.8 km	MPC · JPL
636759	2014 WL_{273}	—	November 21, 2014	Haleakala	Pan-STARRS 1	·	1.4 km	MPC · JPL
636760	2014 WO_{273}	—	March 13, 2011	Kitt Peak	Spacewatch	·	2.5 km	MPC · JPL
636761	2014 WB_{275}	—	October 8, 2008	Kitt Peak	Spacewatch	·	2.6 km	MPC · JPL
636762	2014 WY_{275}	—	July 29, 2008	Mount Lemmon	Mount Lemmon Survey	·	1.5 km	MPC · JPL
636763	2014 WW_{278}	—	April 19, 2006	Mount Lemmon	Mount Lemmon Survey	·	2.3 km	MPC · JPL
636764	2014 WC_{283}	—	October 8, 2008	Kitt Peak	Spacewatch	·	2.1 km	MPC · JPL
636765	2014 WX_{284}	—	May 22, 2003	Kitt Peak	Spacewatch	·	2.0 km	MPC · JPL
636766	2014 WZ_{285}	—	July 14, 2013	Haleakala	Pan-STARRS 1	·	1.6 km	MPC · JPL
636767	2014 WA_{286}	—	November 21, 2014	Haleakala	Pan-STARRS 1	·	1.6 km	MPC · JPL
636768	2014 WE_{286}	—	December 10, 2009	Mount Lemmon	Mount Lemmon Survey	·	3.1 km	MPC · JPL
636769	2014 WY_{291}	—	January 28, 2011	Mount Lemmon	Mount Lemmon Survey	·	2.3 km	MPC · JPL
636770	2014 WJ_{295}	—	February 19, 2010	Mount Lemmon	Mount Lemmon Survey	·	3.6 km	MPC · JPL
636771	2014 WN_{297}	—	June 1, 2012	Mount Lemmon	Mount Lemmon Survey	·	1.8 km	MPC · JPL
636772	2014 WG_{300}	—	October 23, 2009	Mount Lemmon	Mount Lemmon Survey	VER	3.4 km	MPC · JPL
636773	2014 WC_{305}	—	February 22, 2006	Mount Lemmon	Mount Lemmon Survey	·	2.7 km	MPC · JPL
636774	2014 WH_{321}	—	August 31, 2014	Haleakala	Pan-STARRS 1	EOS	1.6 km	MPC · JPL
636775	2014 WB_{324}	—	September 21, 2009	Kitt Peak	Spacewatch	·	1.3 km	MPC · JPL
636776	2014 WH_{324}	—	December 17, 2007	Lulin	LUSS	V	800 m	MPC · JPL
636777	2014 WN_{324}	—	March 9, 2011	Mount Lemmon	Mount Lemmon Survey	·	2.7 km	MPC · JPL
636778	2014 WT_{326}	—	July 26, 2003	Palomar	NEAT	·	2.3 km	MPC · JPL
636779	2014 WD_{331}	—	October 20, 2003	Kitt Peak	Spacewatch	·	2.3 km	MPC · JPL
636780	2014 WN_{333}	—	June 3, 2008	Kitt Peak	Spacewatch	GEF	1.2 km	MPC · JPL
636781	2014 WG_{335}	—	April 2, 2005	Mount Lemmon	Mount Lemmon Survey	·	2.9 km	MPC · JPL
636782	2014 WE_{340}	—	January 23, 2006	Kitt Peak	Spacewatch	EOS	1.9 km	MPC · JPL
636783	2014 WD_{344}	—	February 10, 2011	Mount Lemmon	Mount Lemmon Survey	EOS	1.9 km	MPC · JPL
636784	2014 WV_{344}	—	September 1, 2007	Siding Spring	K. Sárneczky, L. Kiss	·	3.2 km	MPC · JPL
636785	2014 WA_{358}	—	December 6, 2011	Haleakala	Pan-STARRS 1	·	2.6 km	MPC · JPL
636786	2014 WO_{359}	—	April 24, 2007	Mount Lemmon	Mount Lemmon Survey	·	2.9 km	MPC · JPL
636787	2014 WY_{368}	—	September 25, 2014	Kitt Peak	Spacewatch	BAR	970 m	MPC · JPL
636788	2014 WD_{373}	—	August 8, 2013	Haleakala	Pan-STARRS 1	·	1.5 km	MPC · JPL
636789	2014 WA_{376}	—	March 31, 2009	Catalina	CSS	3:2	5.6 km	MPC · JPL
636790	2014 WY_{382}	—	April 13, 1996	Kitt Peak	Spacewatch	EOS	1.9 km	MPC · JPL
636791	2014 WP_{383}	—	January 31, 2006	Kitt Peak	Spacewatch	·	2.7 km	MPC · JPL
636792	2014 WR_{384}	—	November 23, 2014	Mount Lemmon	Mount Lemmon Survey	·	1.5 km	MPC · JPL
636793	2014 WO_{385}	—	November 23, 2014	Haleakala	Pan-STARRS 1	·	1.2 km	MPC · JPL
636794	2014 WW_{386}	—	August 24, 2012	Kitt Peak	Spacewatch	L5	6.5 km	MPC · JPL
636795	2014 WL_{388}	—	November 23, 2014	Haleakala	Pan-STARRS 1	·	2.4 km	MPC · JPL
636796	2014 WU_{398}	—	January 28, 2000	Kitt Peak	Spacewatch	EOS	2.0 km	MPC · JPL
636797	2014 WF_{400}	—	October 22, 2003	Kitt Peak	Spacewatch	EOS	1.9 km	MPC · JPL
636798	2014 WM_{400}	—	April 14, 2007	Kitt Peak	Spacewatch	·	1.8 km	MPC · JPL
636799	2014 WC_{405}	—	November 26, 2014	Haleakala	Pan-STARRS 1	(12739)	1.2 km	MPC · JPL
636800	2014 WZ_{405}	—	November 26, 2009	Kitt Peak	Spacewatch	KOR	1.3 km	MPC · JPL

== 636801–636900 ==
back to top

Designation			Discovery			Properties		Ref
Permanent	Provisional	Named after	Date	Site	Discoverer(s)	Category	Diam.	Ref
636801	2014 WJ_{411}	—	January 26, 2011	Mount Lemmon	Mount Lemmon Survey	·	1.3 km	MPC · JPL
636802	2014 WN_{414}	—	April 27, 2012	Haleakala	Pan-STARRS 1	·	1.4 km	MPC · JPL
636803	2014 WY_{414}	—	November 26, 2014	Haleakala	Pan-STARRS 1	·	1.5 km	MPC · JPL
636804	2014 WO_{416}	—	September 1, 2013	Haleakala	Pan-STARRS 1	·	1.5 km	MPC · JPL
636805	2014 WK_{418}	—	December 17, 2009	Mount Lemmon	Mount Lemmon Survey	·	2.5 km	MPC · JPL
636806	2014 WQ_{420}	—	May 29, 2012	Bergisch Gladbach	W. Bickel	EOS	1.4 km	MPC · JPL
636807	2014 WW_{420}	—	April 6, 2011	Mount Lemmon	Mount Lemmon Survey	·	2.6 km	MPC · JPL
636808	2014 WO_{423}	—	February 1, 2005	Kitt Peak	Spacewatch	·	2.6 km	MPC · JPL
636809	2014 WE_{424}	—	March 14, 2012	Catalina	CSS	·	780 m	MPC · JPL
636810	2014 WR_{427}	—	December 4, 2007	Mount Lemmon	Mount Lemmon Survey	·	840 m	MPC · JPL
636811	2014 WZ_{430}	—	March 10, 2007	Mount Lemmon	Mount Lemmon Survey	·	1.9 km	MPC · JPL
636812	2014 WK_{442}	—	November 9, 2009	Mount Lemmon	Mount Lemmon Survey	·	1.4 km	MPC · JPL
636813	2014 WL_{458}	—	October 14, 2009	Mount Lemmon	Mount Lemmon Survey	·	1.4 km	MPC · JPL
636814	2014 WT_{459}	—	November 17, 2014	Haleakala	Pan-STARRS 1	·	700 m	MPC · JPL
636815	2014 WA_{460}	—	January 12, 2000	Kitt Peak	Spacewatch	·	2.4 km	MPC · JPL
636816	2014 WZ_{462}	—	November 17, 2009	Mount Lemmon	Mount Lemmon Survey	KOR	1.1 km	MPC · JPL
636817	2014 WW_{463}	—	November 27, 2014	Haleakala	Pan-STARRS 1	·	1.3 km	MPC · JPL
636818	2014 WS_{465}	—	October 20, 2014	Mount Lemmon	Mount Lemmon Survey	L5	8.0 km	MPC · JPL
636819	2014 WR_{466}	—	September 16, 2009	Kitt Peak	Spacewatch	·	1.5 km	MPC · JPL
636820	2014 WK_{468}	—	December 14, 2003	Palomar	NEAT	·	900 m	MPC · JPL
636821	2014 WX_{468}	—	November 18, 2009	Mount Lemmon	Mount Lemmon Survey	·	2.2 km	MPC · JPL
636822	2014 WL_{471}	—	April 2, 2006	Kitt Peak	Spacewatch	THM	2.4 km	MPC · JPL
636823	2014 WJ_{472}	—	January 28, 2011	Mount Lemmon	Mount Lemmon Survey	·	1.5 km	MPC · JPL
636824	2014 WD_{473}	—	May 21, 2012	Haleakala	Pan-STARRS 1	EOS	1.5 km	MPC · JPL
636825	2014 WT_{478}	—	October 6, 2013	Kitt Peak	Spacewatch	·	2.7 km	MPC · JPL
636826	2014 WM_{481}	—	February 18, 2002	Cerro Tololo	Deep Lens Survey	·	2.2 km	MPC · JPL
636827	2014 WH_{482}	—	January 29, 2012	Kitt Peak	Spacewatch	·	1.4 km	MPC · JPL
636828	2014 WJ_{484}	—	March 24, 2009	Mount Lemmon	Mount Lemmon Survey	·	1.5 km	MPC · JPL
636829	2014 WC_{485}	—	October 21, 2001	Socorro	LINEAR	·	1.4 km	MPC · JPL
636830	2014 WB_{488}	—	September 18, 2003	Kitt Peak	Spacewatch	EOS	1.9 km	MPC · JPL
636831	2014 WW_{498}	—	August 24, 2008	Siding Spring	SSS	·	4.3 km	MPC · JPL
636832	2014 WL_{499}	—	November 16, 2014	Mount Lemmon	Mount Lemmon Survey	·	1.4 km	MPC · JPL
636833	2014 WH_{500}	—	January 31, 2006	Kitt Peak	Spacewatch	EOS	2.0 km	MPC · JPL
636834	2014 WN_{503}	—	December 13, 2010	Mount Lemmon	Mount Lemmon Survey	·	2.0 km	MPC · JPL
636835	2014 WJ_{511}	—	November 22, 2014	Haleakala	Pan-STARRS 1	L5	6.9 km	MPC · JPL
636836	2014 WQ_{517}	—	November 16, 2014	Haleakala	Pan-STARRS 1	·	1.8 km	MPC · JPL
636837	2014 WC_{518}	—	March 2, 2009	Mount Lemmon	Mount Lemmon Survey	·	660 m	MPC · JPL
636838	2014 WT_{518}	—	November 17, 2014	Haleakala	Pan-STARRS 1	·	1.9 km	MPC · JPL
636839	2014 WZ_{521}	—	November 21, 2009	Mount Lemmon	Mount Lemmon Survey	·	2.8 km	MPC · JPL
636840	2014 WL_{522}	—	August 15, 2013	Haleakala	Pan-STARRS 1	EOS	1.8 km	MPC · JPL
636841	2014 WF_{525}	—	February 5, 2011	Mount Lemmon	Mount Lemmon Survey	·	2.0 km	MPC · JPL
636842	2014 WJ_{531}	—	September 13, 2013	Kitt Peak	Spacewatch	·	1.6 km	MPC · JPL
636843	2014 WH_{565}	—	November 17, 2014	Mount Lemmon	Mount Lemmon Survey	KOR	970 m	MPC · JPL
636844	2014 WE_{567}	—	November 17, 2014	Haleakala	Pan-STARRS 1	·	1.4 km	MPC · JPL
636845	2014 WN_{567}	—	November 26, 2014	Haleakala	Pan-STARRS 1	HOF	2.1 km	MPC · JPL
636846	2014 WQ_{574}	—	November 24, 2014	Haleakala	Pan-STARRS 1	L5	6.8 km	MPC · JPL
636847	2014 WN_{575}	—	November 17, 2014	Haleakala	Pan-STARRS 1	·	1.4 km	MPC · JPL
636848	2014 WC_{576}	—	November 17, 2014	Haleakala	Pan-STARRS 1	L5	6.5 km	MPC · JPL
636849	2014 WC_{580}	—	November 17, 2014	Haleakala	Pan-STARRS 1	L5	6.6 km	MPC · JPL
636850	2014 WP_{602}	—	December 16, 2007	Bergisch Gladbach	W. Bickel	3:2	4.3 km	MPC · JPL
636851	2014 WY_{614}	—	November 22, 2014	Haleakala	Pan-STARRS 1	·	1.5 km	MPC · JPL
636852	2014 XR_{2}	—	December 20, 2004	Mount Lemmon	Mount Lemmon Survey	·	3.3 km	MPC · JPL
636853	2014 XO_{4}	—	February 9, 2010	Mount Lemmon	Mount Lemmon Survey	THM	2.1 km	MPC · JPL
636854	2014 XV_{10}	—	September 30, 2003	Kitt Peak	Spacewatch	EMA	3.0 km	MPC · JPL
636855	2014 XF_{11}	—	October 26, 2009	Kitt Peak	Spacewatch	·	1.9 km	MPC · JPL
636856	2014 XH_{16}	—	November 16, 2014	Mount Lemmon	Mount Lemmon Survey	L5	8.2 km	MPC · JPL
636857	2014 XG_{17}	—	July 13, 2013	Haleakala	Pan-STARRS 1	·	1.2 km	MPC · JPL
636858	2014 XL_{24}	—	August 14, 2013	Haleakala	Pan-STARRS 1	·	1.6 km	MPC · JPL
636859	2014 XP_{30}	—	November 4, 2014	Mount Lemmon	Mount Lemmon Survey	·	1.7 km	MPC · JPL
636860	2014 XD_{33}	—	January 19, 2012	Haleakala	Pan-STARRS 1	·	1.0 km	MPC · JPL
636861	2014 XH_{33}	—	January 19, 2012	Haleakala	Pan-STARRS 1	·	1.1 km	MPC · JPL
636862	2014 XN_{44}	—	December 30, 2005	Mount Lemmon	Mount Lemmon Survey	·	1.7 km	MPC · JPL
636863	2014 YA_{13}	—	October 15, 2007	Mount Lemmon	Mount Lemmon Survey	·	550 m	MPC · JPL
636864	2014 YH_{13}	—	November 21, 2008	Kitt Peak	Spacewatch	VER	2.8 km	MPC · JPL
636865	2014 YY_{18}	—	December 20, 2014	Haleakala	Pan-STARRS 1	·	2.4 km	MPC · JPL
636866	2014 YB_{21}	—	November 20, 2014	Mount Lemmon	Mount Lemmon Survey	·	3.9 km	MPC · JPL
636867	2014 YM_{28}	—	May 6, 2006	Mount Lemmon	Mount Lemmon Survey	·	2.7 km	MPC · JPL
636868	2014 YZ_{30}	—	October 27, 2008	Mount Lemmon	Mount Lemmon Survey	EOS	1.6 km	MPC · JPL
636869	2014 YT_{44}	—	December 24, 2014	Mayhill-ISON	L. Elenin	KON	2.8 km	MPC · JPL
636870	2014 YR_{45}	—	January 13, 1999	Kitt Peak	Spacewatch	(5)	1.2 km	MPC · JPL
636871	2014 YL_{47}	—	October 16, 2001	Palomar	NEAT	MAR	1.4 km	MPC · JPL
636872	2014 YX_{49}	—	November 21, 2006	Mount Lemmon	Mount Lemmon Survey	centaur	100 km	MPC · JPL
636873	2014 YX_{57}	—	July 24, 2007	Lulin	LUSS	·	3.3 km	MPC · JPL
636874	2014 YT_{58}	—	December 21, 2014	Mount Lemmon	Mount Lemmon Survey	·	1.8 km	MPC · JPL
636875	2014 YB_{59}	—	February 14, 2010	Mount Lemmon	Mount Lemmon Survey	HYG	2.4 km	MPC · JPL
636876	2014 YW_{63}	—	December 16, 2014	Haleakala	Pan-STARRS 1	·	2.4 km	MPC · JPL
636877	2014 YL_{64}	—	December 29, 2014	Haleakala	Pan-STARRS 1	·	2.7 km	MPC · JPL
636878	2014 YL_{83}	—	December 21, 2014	Haleakala	Pan-STARRS 1	·	1.6 km	MPC · JPL
636879	2014 YC_{87}	—	December 29, 2014	Haleakala	Pan-STARRS 1	·	2.7 km	MPC · JPL
636880	2014 YQ_{88}	—	December 21, 2014	Haleakala	Pan-STARRS 1	KOR	940 m	MPC · JPL
636881	2015 AK	—	April 27, 2012	Haleakala	Pan-STARRS 1	·	2.0 km	MPC · JPL
636882	2015 AH_{1}	—	July 18, 2001	Palomar	NEAT	·	1.6 km	MPC · JPL
636883	2015 AQ_{30}	—	November 12, 2005	Kitt Peak	Spacewatch	3:2	5.5 km	MPC · JPL
636884	2015 AC_{32}	—	December 21, 2014	Haleakala	Pan-STARRS 1	·	1.5 km	MPC · JPL
636885	2015 AQ_{35}	—	September 22, 2009	Kitt Peak	Spacewatch	·	940 m	MPC · JPL
636886	2015 AL_{36}	—	December 26, 1998	Kitt Peak	Spacewatch	·	2.8 km	MPC · JPL
636887	2015 AS_{39}	—	October 9, 2007	Mount Lemmon	Mount Lemmon Survey	·	590 m	MPC · JPL
636888	2015 AH_{43}	—	January 14, 2015	Haleakala	Pan-STARRS 1	·	500 m	MPC · JPL
636889	2015 AQ_{46}	—	March 31, 2003	Apache Point	SDSS Collaboration	·	1.8 km	MPC · JPL
636890	2015 AT_{50}	—	September 14, 2007	Kitt Peak	Spacewatch	·	2.5 km	MPC · JPL
636891	2015 AV_{51}	—	January 3, 2012	Mount Lemmon	Mount Lemmon Survey	·	670 m	MPC · JPL
636892	2015 AM_{56}	—	January 13, 2015	Haleakala	Pan-STARRS 1	·	490 m	MPC · JPL
636893	2015 AC_{57}	—	November 20, 2008	Kitt Peak	Spacewatch	·	2.7 km	MPC · JPL
636894	2015 AX_{57}	—	October 5, 2013	Haleakala	Pan-STARRS 1	·	2.0 km	MPC · JPL
636895	2015 AD_{60}	—	October 24, 2009	Mount Lemmon	Mount Lemmon Survey	·	1.6 km	MPC · JPL
636896	2015 AQ_{60}	—	October 15, 2007	Mount Lemmon	Mount Lemmon Survey	·	3.6 km	MPC · JPL
636897	2015 AS_{64}	—	October 16, 2010	Charleston	R. Holmes	·	740 m	MPC · JPL
636898	2015 AZ_{66}	—	November 13, 2010	Mount Lemmon	Mount Lemmon Survey	·	790 m	MPC · JPL
636899	2015 AN_{68}	—	January 13, 2015	Haleakala	Pan-STARRS 1	·	1.3 km	MPC · JPL
636900	2015 AH_{70}	—	December 18, 2004	Mount Lemmon	Mount Lemmon Survey	·	1.8 km	MPC · JPL

== 636901–637000 ==
back to top

Designation			Discovery			Properties		Ref
Permanent	Provisional	Named after	Date	Site	Discoverer(s)	Category	Diam.	Ref
636901	2015 AU_{83}	—	February 14, 2010	Mount Lemmon	Mount Lemmon Survey	·	1.6 km	MPC · JPL
636902	2015 AV_{86}	—	March 3, 2009	Kitt Peak	Spacewatch	·	550 m	MPC · JPL
636903	2015 AY_{91}	—	May 1, 2006	Kitt Peak	Deep Ecliptic Survey	KOR	990 m	MPC · JPL
636904	2015 AL_{98}	—	April 29, 2011	Mount Lemmon	Mount Lemmon Survey	·	1.9 km	MPC · JPL
636905	2015 AD_{110}	—	December 21, 2014	Haleakala	Pan-STARRS 1	·	600 m	MPC · JPL
636906	2015 AH_{113}	—	November 1, 2013	Mount Lemmon	Mount Lemmon Survey	KOR	1.1 km	MPC · JPL
636907	2015 AD_{120}	—	August 9, 2002	Cerro Tololo	Deep Ecliptic Survey	V	620 m	MPC · JPL
636908	2015 AC_{123}	—	October 18, 2009	Mount Lemmon	Mount Lemmon Survey	·	1.3 km	MPC · JPL
636909	2015 AK_{127}	—	January 14, 2015	Haleakala	Pan-STARRS 1	·	2.2 km	MPC · JPL
636910	2015 AS_{127}	—	January 14, 2015	Haleakala	Pan-STARRS 1	VER	3.0 km	MPC · JPL
636911	2015 AM_{135}	—	January 30, 2009	Calar Alto	F. Hormuth	·	760 m	MPC · JPL
636912	2015 AZ_{137}	—	March 4, 2012	Mount Lemmon	Mount Lemmon Survey	·	500 m	MPC · JPL
636913	2015 AO_{142}	—	September 4, 2013	Mount Lemmon	Mount Lemmon Survey	·	1.3 km	MPC · JPL
636914	2015 AN_{147}	—	April 14, 2008	Mount Lemmon	Mount Lemmon Survey	MAS	780 m	MPC · JPL
636915	2015 AW_{159}	—	October 22, 2005	Kitt Peak	Spacewatch	(5)	1.4 km	MPC · JPL
636916	2015 AR_{162}	—	February 27, 2012	Haleakala	Pan-STARRS 1	·	690 m	MPC · JPL
636917	2015 AL_{173}	—	March 7, 1997	Kitt Peak	Spacewatch	·	2.0 km	MPC · JPL
636918	2015 AD_{175}	—	January 14, 2015	Haleakala	Pan-STARRS 1	KOR	1.1 km	MPC · JPL
636919	2015 AF_{179}	—	January 14, 2015	Haleakala	Pan-STARRS 1	·	2.8 km	MPC · JPL
636920	2015 AR_{186}	—	January 14, 2015	Haleakala	Pan-STARRS 1	·	1.4 km	MPC · JPL
636921	2015 AT_{191}	—	November 20, 2003	Kitt Peak	Spacewatch	·	790 m	MPC · JPL
636922	2015 AV_{195}	—	January 14, 2015	Haleakala	Pan-STARRS 1	·	640 m	MPC · JPL
636923	2015 AA_{196}	—	October 31, 2010	Piszkés-tető	K. Sárneczky, Z. Kuli	·	690 m	MPC · JPL
636924	2015 AE_{196}	—	January 14, 2015	Haleakala	Pan-STARRS 1	·	1.5 km	MPC · JPL
636925	2015 AG_{198}	—	November 20, 2008	Kitt Peak	Spacewatch	·	2.9 km	MPC · JPL
636926	2015 AW_{200}	—	April 25, 2006	Mount Lemmon	Mount Lemmon Survey	·	650 m	MPC · JPL
636927	2015 AT_{201}	—	October 3, 2010	Kitt Peak	Spacewatch	·	600 m	MPC · JPL
636928	2015 AB_{202}	—	December 26, 2014	Haleakala	Pan-STARRS 1	EOS	1.6 km	MPC · JPL
636929	2015 AC_{205}	—	October 1, 2010	Mount Lemmon	Mount Lemmon Survey	·	610 m	MPC · JPL
636930	2015 AH_{210}	—	November 1, 2010	Mount Lemmon	Mount Lemmon Survey	·	650 m	MPC · JPL
636931	2015 AP_{214}	—	March 4, 2006	Kitt Peak	Spacewatch	·	1.7 km	MPC · JPL
636932	2015 AS_{229}	—	June 30, 2013	Haleakala	Pan-STARRS 1	·	940 m	MPC · JPL
636933	2015 AD_{238}	—	January 15, 2015	Haleakala	Pan-STARRS 1	NAE	1.7 km	MPC · JPL
636934	2015 AK_{248}	—	February 27, 2000	Kitt Peak	Spacewatch	3:2 · SHU	5.4 km	MPC · JPL
636935	2015 AS_{248}	—	September 26, 2006	Mount Lemmon	Mount Lemmon Survey	·	1.2 km	MPC · JPL
636936	2015 AY_{254}	—	March 19, 2007	Mount Lemmon	Mount Lemmon Survey	(1547)	1.5 km	MPC · JPL
636937	2015 AS_{259}	—	December 2, 2014	Haleakala	Pan-STARRS 1	L5	10 km	MPC · JPL
636938	2015 AV_{259}	—	September 21, 2012	Mount Lemmon	Mount Lemmon Survey	L5	7.1 km	MPC · JPL
636939	2015 AW_{261}	—	October 31, 2013	Mount Lemmon	Mount Lemmon Survey	·	650 m	MPC · JPL
636940	2015 AV_{262}	—	October 27, 2005	Catalina	CSS	·	1.3 km	MPC · JPL
636941	2015 AC_{263}	—	October 24, 2005	Mauna Kea	A. Boattini	·	2.7 km	MPC · JPL
636942	2015 AL_{266}	—	July 14, 2013	Haleakala	Pan-STARRS 1	·	570 m	MPC · JPL
636943	2015 AG_{268}	—	January 13, 2015	Haleakala	Pan-STARRS 1	(16286)	1.6 km	MPC · JPL
636944	2015 AY_{268}	—	August 24, 2001	Kitt Peak	Spacewatch	·	2.8 km	MPC · JPL
636945	2015 AZ_{270}	—	October 1, 2013	Mount Lemmon	Mount Lemmon Survey	·	1.4 km	MPC · JPL
636946	2015 AS_{272}	—	March 10, 2005	Mount Lemmon	Mount Lemmon Survey	THM	2.1 km	MPC · JPL
636947	2015 AM_{274}	—	December 26, 2014	Haleakala	Pan-STARRS 1	·	570 m	MPC · JPL
636948	2015 AN_{276}	—	August 26, 2003	Cerro Tololo	Deep Ecliptic Survey	·	2.8 km	MPC · JPL
636949	2015 AJ_{279}	—	October 1, 2003	Kitt Peak	Spacewatch	KOR	1.5 km	MPC · JPL
636950	2015 AF_{289}	—	January 13, 2015	Haleakala	Pan-STARRS 1	·	870 m	MPC · JPL
636951	2015 AL_{291}	—	October 27, 2008	Kitt Peak	Spacewatch	·	1.3 km	MPC · JPL
636952	2015 AH_{292}	—	January 15, 2015	Haleakala	Pan-STARRS 1	L5	7.2 km	MPC · JPL
636953	2015 AO_{304}	—	November 10, 2013	Mount Lemmon	Mount Lemmon Survey	·	2.5 km	MPC · JPL
636954	2015 BV	—	November 2, 2007	Kitt Peak	Spacewatch	·	700 m	MPC · JPL
636955	2015 BC_{1}	—	September 4, 2004	Palomar	NEAT	EUN	1.6 km	MPC · JPL
636956	2015 BG_{1}	—	January 30, 2011	Haleakala	Pan-STARRS 1	·	1.7 km	MPC · JPL
636957	2015 BG_{2}	—	December 20, 2014	Kitt Peak	Spacewatch	·	2.2 km	MPC · JPL
636958	2015 BF_{3}	—	April 4, 2005	Kitt Peak	Spacewatch	·	770 m	MPC · JPL
636959	2015 BW_{6}	—	March 9, 2005	Kitt Peak	Spacewatch	·	720 m	MPC · JPL
636960	2015 BT_{9}	—	January 10, 2006	Mount Lemmon	Mount Lemmon Survey	·	1.5 km	MPC · JPL
636961	2015 BG_{10}	—	March 12, 2011	Mount Lemmon	Mount Lemmon Survey	·	2.0 km	MPC · JPL
636962	2015 BA_{11}	—	September 10, 2004	Kitt Peak	Spacewatch	·	1.8 km	MPC · JPL
636963	2015 BB_{14}	—	February 16, 2010	Mount Lemmon	Mount Lemmon Survey	·	2.8 km	MPC · JPL
636964	2015 BM_{18}	—	September 29, 2013	Kitt Peak	Spacewatch	EOS	1.5 km	MPC · JPL
636965	2015 BW_{26}	—	September 15, 2006	Kitt Peak	Spacewatch	·	620 m	MPC · JPL
636966	2015 BX_{26}	—	August 27, 2001	Kitt Peak	Spacewatch	·	1.3 km	MPC · JPL
636967	2015 BG_{27}	—	December 3, 2005	Mauna Kea	A. Boattini	AGN	1.4 km	MPC · JPL
636968	2015 BV_{30}	—	January 26, 2001	Kitt Peak	Spacewatch	·	1.9 km	MPC · JPL
636969	2015 BB_{38}	—	April 7, 2005	Mount Lemmon	Mount Lemmon Survey	V	880 m	MPC · JPL
636970	2015 BM_{38}	—	March 30, 2011	Piszkés-tető	K. Sárneczky, Z. Kuli	EOS	1.6 km	MPC · JPL
636971	2015 BR_{45}	—	January 17, 2015	Mount Lemmon	Mount Lemmon Survey	EOS	1.3 km	MPC · JPL
636972	2015 BQ_{46}	—	May 15, 2008	Mount Lemmon	Mount Lemmon Survey	HNS	1.1 km	MPC · JPL
636973	2015 BQ_{47}	—	January 17, 2015	Haleakala	Pan-STARRS 1	URS	3.2 km	MPC · JPL
636974	2015 BL_{48}	—	July 20, 1999	Kitt Peak	Spacewatch	·	2.4 km	MPC · JPL
636975	2015 BO_{49}	—	February 23, 2011	Kitt Peak	Spacewatch	·	1.6 km	MPC · JPL
636976	2015 BQ_{49}	—	September 25, 2013	Mount Lemmon	Mount Lemmon Survey	·	1.8 km	MPC · JPL
636977	2015 BK_{57}	—	March 20, 2002	Kitt Peak	Spacewatch	·	670 m	MPC · JPL
636978	2015 BA_{60}	—	September 7, 2008	Mount Lemmon	Mount Lemmon Survey	NEM	2.3 km	MPC · JPL
636979	2015 BC_{68}	—	November 11, 2004	Kitt Peak	Spacewatch	GEF	1.3 km	MPC · JPL
636980	2015 BJ_{73}	—	October 4, 2013	Catalina	CSS	·	1.6 km	MPC · JPL
636981	2015 BT_{79}	—	April 6, 2011	Mount Lemmon	Mount Lemmon Survey	·	1.7 km	MPC · JPL
636982	2015 BV_{79}	—	September 12, 2007	Mount Lemmon	Mount Lemmon Survey	EOS	1.6 km	MPC · JPL
636983	2015 BY_{82}	—	September 10, 2007	Mount Lemmon	Mount Lemmon Survey	EOS	1.8 km	MPC · JPL
636984	2015 BY_{96}	—	August 24, 2007	Kitt Peak	Spacewatch	THM	2.3 km	MPC · JPL
636985	2015 BE_{101}	—	March 13, 2011	Mount Lemmon	Mount Lemmon Survey	THM	2.1 km	MPC · JPL
636986	2015 BF_{101}	—	March 10, 2007	Mount Lemmon	Mount Lemmon Survey	MIS	2.4 km	MPC · JPL
636987	2015 BG_{104}	—	September 16, 2010	Kitt Peak	Spacewatch	·	730 m	MPC · JPL
636988	2015 BY_{105}	—	October 24, 2013	Mount Lemmon	Mount Lemmon Survey	·	1.4 km	MPC · JPL
636989	2015 BX_{112}	—	January 17, 2015	Mount Lemmon	Mount Lemmon Survey	·	1.7 km	MPC · JPL
636990	2015 BD_{115}	—	May 28, 2012	Mount Lemmon	Mount Lemmon Survey	·	2.3 km	MPC · JPL
636991	2015 BM_{115}	—	February 14, 2005	Kitt Peak	Spacewatch	·	1.4 km	MPC · JPL
636992	2015 BN_{116}	—	January 17, 2015	Mount Lemmon	Mount Lemmon Survey	HYG	2.4 km	MPC · JPL
636993	2015 BW_{128}	—	September 17, 2006	Kitt Peak	Spacewatch	·	780 m	MPC · JPL
636994	2015 BE_{129}	—	January 29, 2011	Kitt Peak	Spacewatch	·	1.8 km	MPC · JPL
636995	2015 BW_{130}	—	February 26, 2012	Haleakala	Pan-STARRS 1	·	580 m	MPC · JPL
636996	2015 BZ_{134}	—	January 17, 2015	Haleakala	Pan-STARRS 1	·	2.3 km	MPC · JPL
636997	2015 BX_{135}	—	November 11, 2004	Kitt Peak	Spacewatch	·	1.9 km	MPC · JPL
636998	2015 BA_{137}	—	October 23, 2003	Kitt Peak	Spacewatch	·	550 m	MPC · JPL
636999	2015 BS_{140}	—	December 18, 2007	Kitt Peak	Spacewatch	·	3.5 km	MPC · JPL
637000	2015 BX_{140}	—	September 18, 2010	Mount Lemmon	Mount Lemmon Survey	·	760 m	MPC · JPL

back to top

== Meaning of names ==
As minor planet discoveries are confirmed, they are given a permanent number by the IAU's Minor Planet Center (MPC), and the discoverers can then submit names for them, following the IAU's naming conventions. The list below concerns those minor planets in the specified number-range that have received names, and explains the meanings of those names.

Official naming citations of newly named small Solar System bodies are approved and published in a bulletin by IAU's Working Group for Small Bodies Nomenclature (WGSBN). Before May 2021, citations were published in MPC's Minor Planet Circulars for many decades. Recent citations can also be found on the JPL Small-Body Database (SBDB). Until his death in 2016, German astronomer Lutz D. Schmadel compiled these citations into the Dictionary of Minor Planet Names (DMP) and regularly updated the collection.

Based on Paul Herget's The Names of the Minor Planets, Schmadel also researched the unclear origin of numerous asteroids, most of which had been named prior to World War II. This article incorporates text from this source, which is in the public domain: SBDB New namings may only be added to this list below after official publication as the preannouncement of names is condemned. The WGSBN publishes a comprehensive guideline for the naming rules of non-cometary small Solar System bodies.

Named minor planet	Provisional	This minor planet was named for...	Ref · Catalog
636680 Lisaloring	2014 WE_{59}	Lisa Loring, American actress.	IAU · 636680
