= 83982 Crantor =

Minor planet in the Solar System

Discovery
- Discovered by: NEAT
- Discovery site: Palomar Obs.
- Discovery date: 12 April 2002

Designations
- Pronunciation: /ˈkræntɔːr/
- Named after: Crantor (Greek mythology)
- Alternative designations: 2002 GO_{9}
- Minor planet category: Uranus co-orbital centaur · distant
- Symbol: (astrological)

Orbital characteristics
- Epoch 4 September 2017 (JD 2458000.5)
- Uncertainty parameter 3
- Observation arc: 13.37 yr (4,882 days)
- Aphelion: 24.862 AU
- Perihelion: 14.047 AU
- Semi-major axis: 19.454 AU
- Eccentricity: 0.2780
- Orbital period (sidereal): 85.81 yr (31,342 days)
- Mean anomaly: 63.889°
- Mean motion: 0° 0^{m} 41.4^{s} / day
- Inclination: 12.770°
- Longitude of ascending node: 117.40°
- Argument of perihelion: 93.203°

Physical characteristics
- Mean diameter: 59±12 km
- Synodic rotation period: 13.94 h
- Geometric albedo: 0.121±0.064
- Spectral type: RR; B–V = 1.105±0.042; V–R = 0.761±0.039
- Absolute magnitude (H): 8.26 · 8.693±0.057 (R) · 8.8 · 9.03±0.16 · 9.17

83982 Crantor (provisional designation 2002 GO_{9}) is a centaur in a 1:1 resonance with Uranus, approximately 60 kilometers (37 miles) in diameter. It was discovered on 12 April 2002, by astronomers of the Near-Earth Asteroid Tracking at the Palomar Observatory in California, United States. This minor planet was named after Crantor from Greek mythology.

== Orbit and classification ==
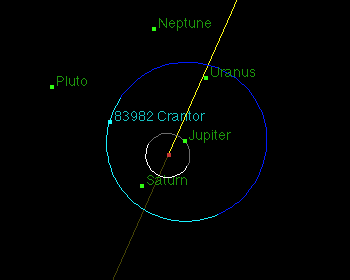
A diagram showing the orbits of Crantor and Jupiter

Crantor orbits the Sun at a distance of 14.0–24.9 AU once every 85 years and 10 months (31,342 days). Its orbit has a semi-major axis of 19.5 AU, a moderate eccentricity of 0.28, and an inclination of 13° with respect to the ecliptic.

The minor planet was first observed on a precovery taken by the Sloan Digital Sky Survey on 19 March 2001. One night later, the body's observation arc begins with an observation by the Air Force Maui Optical Station (AMOS) at Haleakala Observatory on the island of Hawaii, more than a year prior to its official discovery observation by NEAT.

=== Co-orbital with Uranus ===
Crantor was first suggested as a possible co-orbital of Uranus in 2006. The body follows a complex, transient horseshoe orbit around Uranus. Classical horseshoe orbits include the Lagrangian points L_{3}, L_{4}, and L_{5}, but Crantor's horseshoe orbit also brings it near Uranus. The motion of Crantor is mainly controlled by the influence of the Sun and Uranus, but Saturn has a significant destabilizing effect. The precession of the nodes of Crantor is accelerated by Saturn, controlling its evolution and short-term stability.

== Naming ==
This minor planet was named after Crantor, a Lapith from Greek mythology. He was killed in the battle between the Lapiths and the Centaurs by Demoleon, who tore off Crantor's chest and left shoulder with a tree trunk that he had thrown at Theseus, who ducked out of the way (centaur Demoleon is not to be confused with Trojan warrior Demoleon, see 18493 Demoleon). The official naming citation was published by the Minor Planet Center on 15 December 2005 (M.P.C. 55724).

== Physical characteristics ==
Water ice has been detected on Crantor with a confidence of more than 3σ (99.7%).

=== Rotation period ===
A fragmentary rotational lightcurve of Crantor was obtained from photometric observations at the Sierra Nevada Observatory in Granada, Spain. Lightcurve analysis gave a rotation period of 13.94 hours with a brightness amplitude of 0.14 magnitude (U=1).

=== Diameter and albedo ===
According to the observations by the Herschel Space Telescope with its PACS instrument, Crantor measures 59±12 kilometers in diameter and its surface has an albedo of 0.121. The Collaborative Asteroid Lightcurve Link assumes an albedo of 0.10 and derives a diameter of 61.59 kilometers based on an absolute magnitude of 9.17.

== See also ==
- (687170) 2011 QF99
- (636872) 2014 YX49
- (472651) 2015 DB216
- List of centaurs (small Solar System bodies) § 83982
