= (472651) 2015 DB216 =

Centaur and Uranus co-orbital

(472651) 2015 DB_{216}
Discovery
- Discovered by: Mount Lemmon Survey (G96)
- Discovery date: February 27, 2015

Designations
- Minor planet category: Uranus co-orbital centaur · distant

Orbital characteristics
- Epoch 4 September 2017 (JD 2458000.5)
- Uncertainty parameter 2
- Observation arc: 13.17 yr (4,812 days)
- Aphelion: 25.478 AU
- Perihelion: 12.944 AU
- Semi-major axis: 19.211 AU
- Eccentricity: 0.3262
- Orbital period (sidereal): 84.20 yr (30,755 days)
- Mean anomaly: 314.27°
- Mean motion: 0° 0^{m} 42.12^{s} / day
- Inclination: 37.709°
- Longitude of ascending node: 6.2797°
- Argument of perihelion: 237.99°
- Jupiter MOID: 8.37627 AU (1.253072 Tm)

Physical characteristics
- Dimensions: 44–160 km
- Apparent magnitude: 20.8 (2015); 20.7 (2016); 19.4 (2029; peak)
- Absolute magnitude (H): 8.4

(472651) 2015 DB_{216} is a centaur and Uranus co-orbital discovered on February 27, 2015, by the Mount Lemmon Survey. It is the second known centaur on a horseshoe orbit with Uranus, and the third Uranus co-orbital discovered after 2011 QF99 (a trojan) and 83982 Crantor (a horseshoe librator). A second Uranian trojan, 2014 YX49, was announced in 2017.

== Description ==
An early orbital calculation of the asteroid with an observation arc of 10 days suggested an extremely close MOID to Neptune, but further observations on March 27 refined the orbit to show that the asteroid passes no less than several astronomical units away from Neptune, and show the orbit instead being that of a typical centaur, with a perihelion near that of Saturn, and traveling near to Uranus and Neptune. Later, observations suggested a distant orbit traveling extremely distant from the Sun, but now this too has been shown to be incorrect with later observations. However, it does have a semi-major axis near that of Uranus, making it a Uranus co-orbital. However, it is not a trojan, as it stays near the opposite side of the Sun from Uranus.

A paper, submitted on July 27, 2015, analyzed 2015 DB_{216}'s orbital evolution, and suggested that it may be more stable than the other known Uranus co-orbitals due to its high inclination, and that many more undiscovered Uranus co-orbitals may exist.

Precovery images from 2003 were located soon after 2015 DB_{216}'s discovery, giving it an 11-year observation arc.

== See also ==
- (687170) 2011 QF99 – first Uranus trojan discovered
- 83982 Crantor – centaur in a co-orbital configuration with Uranus
- (636872) 2014 YX49 – centaur in a co-orbital configuration with Uranus and orbital resonance with Saturn

== Notes ==
1. Assuming an albedo from 0.05 (160 km) to 1 (40 km); 2015 DB_{216} is definitely somewhere within this range, and cannot be any smaller than 40 kilometers, assuming the absolute magnitude is correct.
