= Uranus trojan =

Asteroid with which Uranus shares its orbit around the Sun

A Uranus trojan is a small Solar System body that shares an orbit with Uranus and the Sun. Predicted in simulations earlier, two trojans have been discovered in Uranus’s Lagrangian point L_{4} (leading Uranus).

(687170) 2011 QF99 was the first body to be classified as such a trojan, in 2013. (636872) 2014 YX49 was the second, in 2017.

Several theories have come to be on how such trojans could orbit Uranus. Gravitational scattering is the most popular, stating that such asteroids (or comets) could have been gravitationally pulled by the other planets, leading them on a perfect trajectory towards Uranus, or somewhere where Uranus’s gravitational pull is neutral.

List of Uranus trojans
Designation	Cloud	Semimajor axis (AU)	Perihelion (AU)	Eccentricity	Inclination (°)	(H)	Diameter (km)
(687170) 2011 QF99	L_{4}	19.167	15.765	0.177	10.796	9.6	60
(636872) 2014 YX49	L_{4}	19.113	13.762	0.279	25.524	8.79	77

== See also ==
- Trojan (celestial body)
- Venus trojan
- Earth trojan
- Mars trojan
- Jupiter trojan
- Neptune trojan

== Sources ==
- Dvorak, R.; Bazsó, á.; Zhou, L.-Y. (2010). "Where are the Uranus Trojans?". Celestial Mechanics and Dynamical Astronomy. 107 (1–2): 51–62. arXiv:0911.2366. Bibcode:2010CeMDA.107...51D. doi:10.1007/s10569-010-9261-y. ISSN 0923-2958.
- Zhou, Lei; Zhou, Li-Yong; Dvorak, Rudolf; Li, Jian (2020). "Systematic survey of the dynamics of Uranus Trojans". Astronomy & Astrophysics. 633: A153. arXiv:1912.10273. Bibcode:2020A&A...633A.153Z. doi:10.1051/0004-6361/201936332. ISSN 0004-6361.
