= (636872) 2014 YX49 =

Minor planet co-orbital with Uranus

(636872) 2014 YX_{49}
- Animation of 2014 YX_{49} relative to Sun and Uranus 1600–2500; 2014 YX_{49} · Uranus · Sun

Discovery
- Discovered by: Mount Lemmon Survey
- Discovery site: Mount Lemmon Obs.
- Discovery date: November 21, 2006

Designations
- Minor planet category: Uranus trojan centaur · distant

Orbital characteristics
- Epoch February 16, 2017 (JD 2457800.5)
- Uncertainty parameter 1
- Observation arc: 4876 days (13.35 yr)
- Aphelion: 24.4207 AU (3.65328 Tm)
- Perihelion: 13.8401 AU (2.07045 Tm)
- Semi-major axis: 19.1304 AU (2.86187 Tm)
- Eccentricity: 0.276539
- Orbital period (sidereal): 83.67 yr (30562 d)
- Mean anomaly: 75.587°
- Inclination: 25.55097°
- Longitude of ascending node: 91.44425°
- Argument of perihelion: 280.584°
- Earth MOID: 12.9424 AU (1.93616 Tm)
- Jupiter MOID: 9.47006 AU (1.416701 Tm)

Physical characteristics
- Mean diameter: 77 km (est. at 0.09)
- Apparent magnitude: 21.6
- Absolute magnitude (H): 8.8

(636872) 2014 YX_{49} is a centaur and Uranus co-orbital, approximately 77 kilometers (48 miles) in diameter. Discovered by the Mount Lemmon Survey on November 21, 2006, it is the second known centaur on a tadpole orbit with Uranus, and the fourth Uranus co-orbital discovered after 83982 Crantor, (687170) 2011 QF99 and (472651) 2015 DB216.

== Description ==
2014 YX_{49} is a temporary L_{4} trojan of Uranus, the second one (2011 QF_{99} was identified first) to be confirmed as currently trapped in such a resonant state. This object may have remained as a L_{4} Uranian trojan for about 60,000 years and it can continue that way for another 80,000 years. Numerical integrations suggest that it may stay within Uranus's co-orbital zone for nearly one million years.

Besides being a L_{4} Uranian trojan, 2014 YX_{49} is trapped in the 7:20 mean motion resonance with Saturn as well; therefore, this minor body is currently subjected to a three-body resonance. The other known Uranian trojan, 2011 QF_{99}, is also in this resonant configuration.

== See also ==
- 83982 Crantor
- (472651) 2015 DB216
- (687170) 2011 QF99
- List of centaurs (small Solar System bodies) § 2014 YX49
