= (687170) 2011 QF99 =

Uranus trojan

(687170) 2011 QF_{99}
- Animation of 2011 QF_{99} relative to Sun and Uranus 1600–2500; 2011 QF_{99} · Uranus · Sun

Discovery
- Discovered by: M. Alexandersen
- Discovery site: Mauna Kea Obs.
- Discovery date: 29 August 2011 (first observation only)

Designations
- Minor planet category: Uranus trojan centaur · distant

Orbital characteristics
- Epoch 4 September 2017 (JD 2458000.5)
- Uncertainty parameter 3
- Observation arc: 3.97 yr (1,449 days)
- Aphelion: 22.422 AU
- Perihelion: 15.659 AU
- Semi-major axis: 19.040 AU
- Eccentricity: 0.1776
- Orbital period (sidereal): 83.08 yr (30,346 days)
- Mean anomaly: 283.84°
- Mean motion: 0° 0^{m} 42.84^{s} / day
- Inclination: 10.833°
- Longitude of ascending node: 222.52°
- Argument of perihelion: 288.25°

Physical characteristics
- Mean diameter: 60 km (calculated)
- Geometric albedo: 0.05 (assumed)
- Absolute magnitude (H): 9.6 (R-band); 9.7

(687170) 2011 QF_{99} is a minor planet from the outer Solar System and the first known Uranus trojan to be discovered. It measures approximately 60 kilometers (37 miles) in diameter, assuming an albedo of 0.05. It was first observed 29 August 2011 during a deep survey of trans-Neptunian objects conducted with the Canada–France–Hawaii Telescope, but its identification as a Uranian trojan was not announced until 2013.

2011 QF_{99} temporarily orbits near Uranus's L_{4} Lagrangian point (leading Uranus). It will continue to librate around L_{4} for at least 70,000 years and will remain a Uranus co-orbital for up to three million years. 2011 QF_{99} is thus a temporary Uranus trojan—a centaur captured some time ago.

Uranus trojans are generally expected to be unstable and none of them are thought to be of primordial origin. A simulation led to the conclusion that at any given time, 0.4% of the centaurs in the scattered population within 34 AU would be Uranus co-orbitals, of which 64% (0.256% of all centaurs) would be in horseshoe orbits, 10% (0.04%) would be quasi-satellites, and 26% (0.104%) would be trojans (evenly split between the L_{4} and L_{5} groups). A second Uranian trojan, (636872) 2014 YX49, was announced in 2017.
