= 2023 FW14 =

Mars trojan asteroid

2023 FW_{14}
Discovery
- Discovered by: Pan-STARRS 2
- Discovery site: Haleakala Observatory
- Discovery date: 18 March 2023

Designations
- Minor planet category: Martian L4

Orbital characteristics
- Epoch 13 September 2023 (JD 2460200.5)
- Uncertainty parameter 0
- Observation arc: 5503 days (15.07 yr)
- Aphelion: 1.764696353 AU (263.9948168 Gm)
- Perihelion: 1.2828435 AU (191.91066 Gm)
- Semi-major axis: 1.523769939 AU (227.9527383 Gm)
- Eccentricity: 0.15811207
- Orbital period (sidereal): 1.88099354 yr (687.032891 d)
- Mean anomaly: 26.03608°
- Mean motion: 0° 31^{m} 26.373^{s} / day
- Inclination: 13.272714°
- Longitude of ascending node: 21.84773°
- Argument of perihelion: 245.29506°
- Earth MOID: 0.331663 AU (49.6161 Gm)
- Jupiter MOID: 3.31104 AU (495.325 Gm)

Physical characteristics
- Dimensions: ~320 m
- Geometric albedo: 0.047
- Spectral type: X
- Absolute magnitude (H): 21.6

2023 FW_{14} is a small asteroid orbiting near the L_{4} point of Mars (60 degrees ahead of Mars on its orbit). As of March 2024, it is the second known asteroid to orbit the leading L_{4} point of Mars together with (121514) 1999 UJ7, although at least 15 other asteroids orbit Mars's trailing L_{5} point, including 5261 Eureka, (101429) 1998 VF31, and (311999) 2007 NS2. Not only does 2023 FW_{14} orbit on the other side of Mars from other similar asteroids, its spectrum is different as well, but close to that of (121514) 1999 UJ_{7}.

== Orbit ==
2023 FW_{14} orbits around the L_{4} point of Mars in a somewhat stable orbit and it may be affected by the Yarkovsky effect. It is far less stable than 1999 UJ_{7}. Its initial orbit was eventually improved when precovery images were found. Its current orbit is of the Amor type. Its orbital evolution into the past strongly suggests that it cannot be a primordial trojan like Eureka.

== Physical characteristics ==
Its spectrum suggests that it is an X-type asteroid, which is different from 5261 Eureka and 1998 VF_{31} but compatible with that of 1999 UJ_{7}, and this is somewhat puzzling since different mineral compositions suggest different origins for the two groups of asteroids. Asteroid 2023 FW_{14} might have been captured from the Mars-crossing near-Earth asteroid population; alternatively, it might be a fragment of 1999 UJ_{7} produced in situ nearly 1 Myr ago.

== See also ==
- 5261 Eureka (1990 MB)
- (101429) 1998 VF31
- (121514) 1999 UJ7
- (311999) 2007 NS2
- (385250) 2001 DH47
- (816688) 2011 SC191
- 2009 SE
- 2011 SL25
- 2011 SP189
- 2011 UB256
- 2011 UN63
- 2016 CP31
- 2018 EC4
- 2018 FC4
- 2020 VT1
