= Trojan (celestial body) =

Objects sharing the orbit of a larger one

The trojan points are located on the L_{4} and L_{5} Lagrange points, on the orbital path of the secondary object (blue), around the primary object (yellow). All of the Lagrange points are highlighted in red.

In astronomy, a trojan is a small celestial body (mostly asteroids) that shares the orbit of a larger body, remaining in a stable orbit approximately 60° ahead of or behind the main body near one of its Lagrangian points L_{4} and L_{5}. Trojans can share the orbits of planets or of large moons.

Trojans are one type of co-orbital object. In this arrangement, a star and a planet orbit about their common barycenter, which is close to the center of the star because it is usually much more massive than the orbiting planet. In turn, a much smaller mass than both the star and the planet, located at one of the Lagrangian points of the star–planet system, is subject to a combined gravitational force that acts through this barycenter. Hence the smallest object orbits around the barycenter with the same orbital period as the planet, and the arrangement can remain stable over time.

In the Solar System, most known trojans share the orbit of Jupiter. They are divided into the Greek camp at L_{4} (ahead of Jupiter) and the Trojan camp at L_{5} (trailing Jupiter). More than a million Jupiter trojans larger than one kilometer are thought to exist, of which more than 7,000 are currently catalogued. In other planetary orbits only nine Mars trojans, 31 Neptune trojans, two Uranus trojans, two Earth trojans, and one Saturn trojan have been found to date. A temporary Venus trojan is also known. Numerical orbital dynamics stability simulations indicate that Saturn probably does not have any primordial trojans.

The same arrangement can appear when the primary object is a planet and the secondary is one of its moons, whereby much smaller trojan moons can share its orbit. All known trojan moons are part of the Saturn system. Telesto and Calypso are trojans of Tethys, and Helene and Polydeuces of Dione.

== Trojan minor planets ==
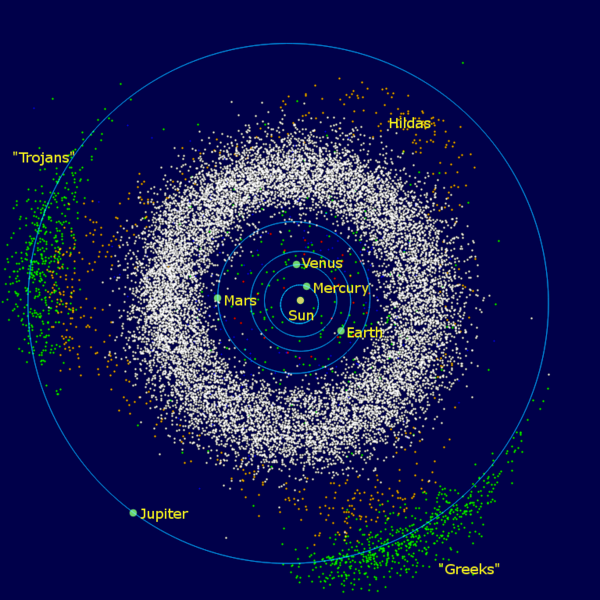
The Jupiter trojans are seen in this graphic as Greek camp at L_{4} ahead of Jupiter and as Trojan camp at L_{5} trailing Jupiter along its orbital path. It also shows the asteroid belt between Mars and Jupiter and the Hilda asteroids.: Jupiter trojans / Asteroid belt / Hilda asteroids

In 1772, the Italian–French mathematician and astronomer Joseph-Louis Lagrange obtained two constant-pattern solutions (collinear and equilateral) of the general three-body problem. In the restricted three-body problem, with one mass negligible (which Lagrange did not consider), the five possible positions of that mass are now termed Lagrange points. On February 12th, 1906, Max Wolf discovered the trojan asteroid 588 Achilles; His contemporary Carl Charlier noticed that the asteroid was caught in the L_{4} point of Jupiter, and thus 588 Achilles was the first discovered instance of Lagrange's theoretical calculations applying in practice.

The term trojan originally referred to the "trojan asteroids" (Jovian trojans) that orbit close to the Lagrangian points of Jupiter. These were long named for figures from the Trojan War of Greek mythology. By convention, the asteroids orbiting near the L_{4} point of Jupiter were named for the characters from the Greek side of the war, whereas those orbiting near the L_{5} of Jupiter were from the Trojan side. There are two early exceptions, named before the convention was adopted: 624 Hektor in the L_{4} group, and 617 Patroclus in the L_{5} group. The rule has since been loosened, with (As of 2026) 3 high-numbered trojans named after modern sports figures.

Astronomers estimate that the Jovian trojans are about as numerous as the asteroids of the asteroid belt.

Later on, objects were found orbiting near the Lagrangian points of Neptune, Mars, Earth, Uranus, and Venus. Minor planets at the Lagrangian points of planets other than Jupiter may be called Lagrangian minor planets.

- Four Martian trojans are known: 5261 Eureka, (101429) 1998 VF31, (311999) 2007 NS2, and (121514) 1999 UJ7 – the only trojan body in the leading L_{4} Lagrange point, There seem to be, also, (385250) 2001 DH47, (816688) 2011 SC191, and 2011 UN63, but these have not yet been accepted by the Minor Planet Center.
- There are 28 known Neptunian trojans, but the large Neptunian trojans are expected to outnumber the large Jovian trojans by an order of magnitude.
- (706765) 2010 TK7 was confirmed to be the first known Earth trojan in 2011. It is located in the L_{4} Lagrangian point, which lies ahead of the Earth. (614689) 2020 XL5 was found to be another Earth trojan in 2021. It is also at L_{4}.
- (687170) 2011 QF99 was identified as the first Uranus trojan in 2013. It is located at the L_{4} Lagrangian point. A second one, (636872) 2014 YX49, was announced in 2017.
- 2013 ND15 is a temporary Venusian trojan, the first one to be identified.
- The large asteroids Ceres and Vesta have temporary trojans.
- Saturn has 1 known trojan in the L_{4} Lagrangian point, 2019 UO_{14}.

=== Trojans by planet ===
Planet	Number in L_{4}	Number in L_{5}	List (L_{4})	List (L_{5})
Mercury	0	0	—	—
Venus	1	0	2013 ND15	—
Earth	2	0	(706765) 2010 TK7, (614689) 2020 XL5	—
Mars	2	13	(121514) 1999 UJ7, 2023 FW14	Many
Jupiter	7508	4044	Greek camp	Trojan camp
Saturn	1	0	2019 UO_{14}	—
Uranus	2	0	(687170) 2011 QF99, (636872) 2014 YX49	—
Neptune	28	7	Many	Many

== Stability ==
Whether or not a system of star, planet, and trojan is stable depends on how large the perturbations are to which it is subject. If, for example, the planet is the mass of Earth, and there is also a Jupiter-mass object orbiting that star, the trojan's orbit would be much less stable than if the second planet had the mass of Pluto.

As a rule of thumb, the system is likely to be long-lived if m_{1} > 100m_{2} > 10,000m_{3} (in which m_{1}, m_{2}, and m_{3} are the masses of the star, planet, and trojan).

More formally, in a three-body system with circular orbits, the stability condition is 27(m_{1}m_{2} + m_{2}m_{3} + m_{3}m_{1}) < (m_{1} + m_{2} + m_{3})^{2}. So the trojan being a mote of dust, m_{3}→0, imposes a lower bound on m_{1}/m_{2} of (25+√621)/2 ≈ 24.9599. And if the star were hyper-massive, m_{1}→+∞, then under Newtonian gravity, the system is stable whatever the planet and trojan masses. And if m_{1}/m_{2} = m_{2}/m_{3}, then both must exceed 13+√168 ≈ 25.9615. However, this all assumes a three-body system; once other bodies are introduced, even if distant and small, stability of the system requires even larger ratios.

== See also ==
- Lissajous orbit – Quasi-periodic orbital trajectory
- List of objects at Lagrange points
- Tadpole orbit – Type of co-orbital motion of a small orbiting body relative to a larger orbiting body
- Trojan wave packet – Wave packet that is nonstationary and nonspreading
