= 2019 UO14 =

First confirmed Saturnian trojan

2019 UO_{14}
Discovery
- Discovered by: Pan-STARRS 1
- Discovery site: Haleakala, Hawaii
- Discovery date: 23 October 2019

Designations
- Minor planet category: Saturn trojan (L_{4}); centaur

Orbital characteristics
- Epoch 17 October 2024 (JD 2458770.8)
- Uncertainty parameter 1
- Observation arc: 3205 days
- Aphelion: 12.110 AU
- Perihelion: 7.4846 AU
- Semi-major axis: 9.797 AU
- Eccentricity: 0.236
- Mean anomaly: 58.80761°
- Mean motion: 0.03214010°/day
- Inclination: 32.828°
- Earth MOID: 6.54192 AU
- Jupiter MOID: 2.69283 AU
- Saturn MOID: 1.20089 AU

Physical characteristics
- Mean diameter: ~7.5 km (full range 6–13 km)
- Absolute magnitude (H): 13.31–13.35

2019 UO_{14} is the first ever confirmed Saturnian trojan, a small Solar System body orbiting the Sun around the L_{4} Lagrangian point. It was discovered on 23 October 2019 by the Pan-STARRS 1 telescope at Haleakala, Hawaii. The object was captured probably a few thousand years ago, and will remain there for 1,000 more years until influences from other outer planets remove 2019 UO_{14} from its current trojan orbit.

== Orbit ==
Before Saturn captured 2019 UO_{14}, it was floating around the Solar System as a centaur. 2,000 years ago, Saturn trapped the centaur in its L_{4} point, making it into a trojan. However, due to continuous pulling from Jupiter and Uranus, eventually 2019 UO_{14} will be ejected from its trojan orbit. It is suggested that there will be more Saturnian trojans to be discovered, since Saturn has a large gravitational pull.

== See also ==
- 2013 VZ70 – First Saturn co-orbital discovered

== Sources ==
- Hui 許, Man-To 文韜; Wiegert, Paul A.; Weryk, Robert; Micheli, Marco; Tholen, David J.; Deen, Sam; Walker, Andrew J.; Wainscoat, Richard (2024-11-01). "2019 UO 14: A Transient Trojan of Saturn". The Astrophysical Journal Letters. 975 (1): L3. arXiv:2409.19725. doi:10.3847/2041-8213/ad84ef. ISSN 2041-8205.
- Pan, Nicolas; Gallardo, Tabaré (2025). "An attempt to build a dynamical catalog of present-day solar system co-orbitals". Celestial Mechanics and Dynamical Astronomy. 137 2. arXiv:2410.20015. doi:10.1007/s10569-024-10234-y.
