= 2016 AA165 =

Mars trojan

2016 AA165 is a Mars Trojan, it was discovered in 2016.

== Orbit ==
It is in the L5 Lagrange point, along with Eureka, it has a perihelion of 1.386 AU, and an aphelion of 1.622. It also has an eccentricity of 0.090.

== History ==
It was discovered in 2016 by the University of Arizona Mt Lemmon survey, but was rediscovered in 2024.
