= (706765) 2010 TK7 =

Near-Earth asteroid and Earth trojan

(706765) 2010 TK_{7}
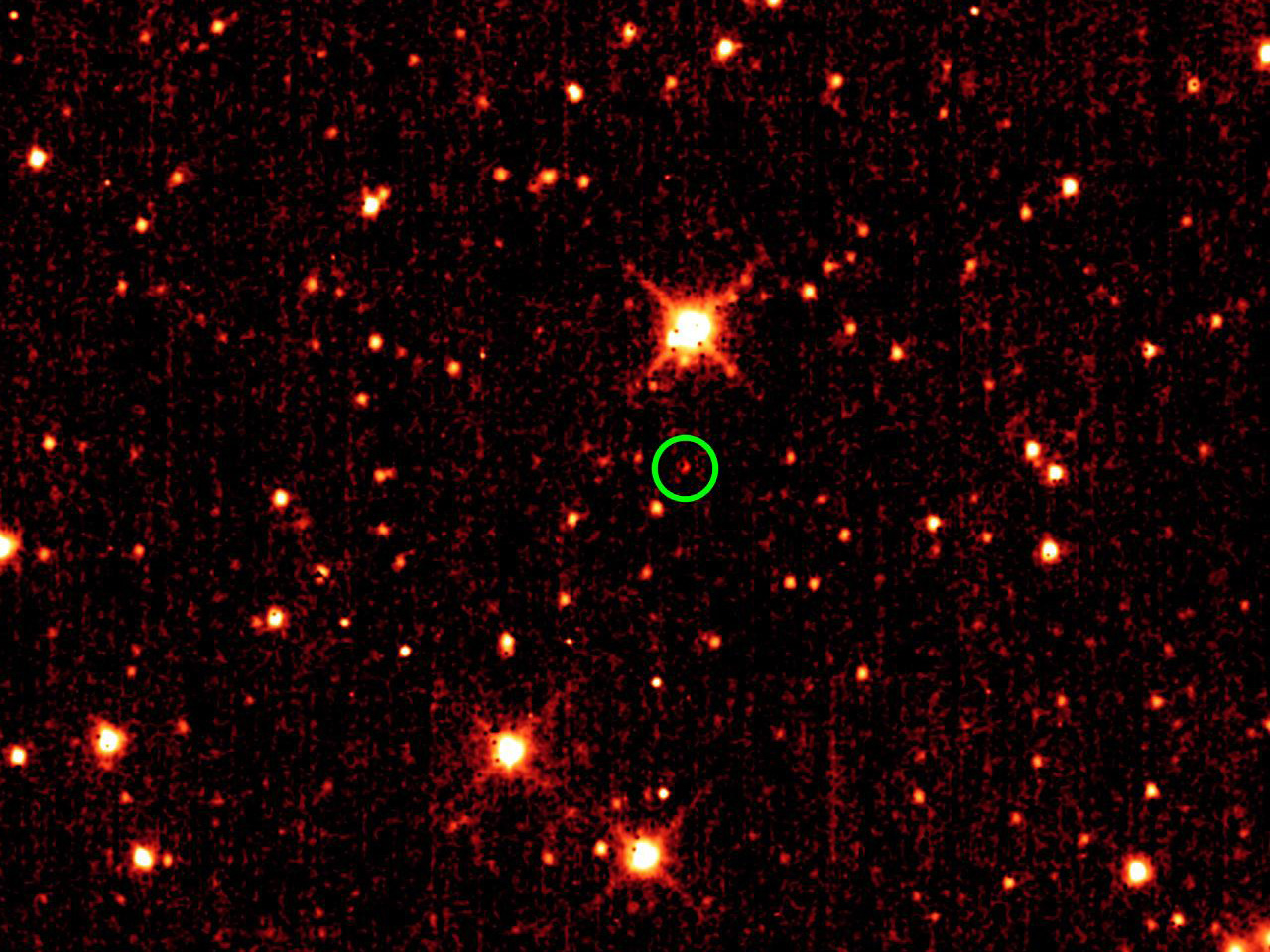
- Asteroid 2010 TK_{7} (circled in green) in image from the WISE spacecraft

Discovery
- Discovered by: WISE spacecraft
- Discovery site: LEO, polar orbit
- Discovery date: 1 October 2010

Designations
- Minor planet category: Earth trojan; Aten (2014); Apollo (2013)

Orbital characteristics
- Epoch 13 January 2016 (JD 2457400.5)
- Uncertainty parameter 0
- Observation arc: 768 days (2.10 yr)
- Aphelion: 1.1903 AU (178.07 Gm)
- Perihelion: 0.80918 AU (121.052 Gm)
- Semi-major axis: 0.99972 AU (149.556 Gm)
- Eccentricity: 0.19059
- Orbital period (sidereal): 1.00 yr (365.10 d)
- Average orbital speed: 29.8 km/s (Note: v = 42.1219 √1/0.9989 − 0.5/0.9989.)
- Mean anomaly: 354.14°
- Mean motion: 0° 59^{m} 9.672^{s} / day
- Inclination: 20.890°
- Longitude of ascending node: 96.498°
- Argument of perihelion: 45.927°
- Earth MOID: 0.0837911 AU (12.53497 Gm)

Physical characteristics
- Mean diameter: 379±123 m
- Geometric albedo: 0.059±0.049
- Apparent magnitude: 20.8 (when near Earth) to 23.6
- Absolute magnitude (H): 20.8

(706765) 2010 TK_{7} is a sub-kilometer near-Earth asteroid and the first Earth trojan discovered; it precedes Earth in its orbit around the Sun. Trojan objects are most easily conceived as orbiting at a Lagrangian point, a dynamically stable location (where the combined gravitational force acts through the Sun's and Earth's barycenter) 60 degrees ahead of or behind a massive orbiting body, in a type of 1:1 orbital resonance. In reality, they oscillate around such a point. Such objects had previously been observed in the orbits of Mars, Jupiter, Neptune, and the Saturnian moons Tethys and Dione.

2010 TK_{7} has a diameter of about 300 meters (1,000 ft). Its path oscillates about the Sun–Earth L_{4} Lagrangian point (60 degrees ahead of Earth), shuttling between its closest approach to Earth and its closest approach to the L_{3} point (180 degrees from Earth).

The asteroid was discovered in October 2010 by the NEOWISE team of astronomers using NASA's Wide-field Infrared Survey Explorer (WISE).

== Discovery ==
WISE, a space telescope launched into Earth orbit in December 2009, imaged 2010 TK_{7} in October 2010 while carrying out a program to scan the entire sky from January 2010 to February 2011. Spotting an asteroid sharing Earth's orbit is normally difficult from the ground, because their potential locations are generally in the daytime sky. After follow-up work at the University of Hawaii and the Canada–France–Hawaii Telescope, its orbit was evaluated on 21 May 2011 and the trojan character of its motion was published in July 2011. The orbital information was published in the journal Nature by Paul Wiegert of the University of Western Ontario, Martin Connors of Athabasca University and Christian Veillet, the executive director of the Canada–France–Hawaii Telescope.

== Physical and orbital characteristics ==
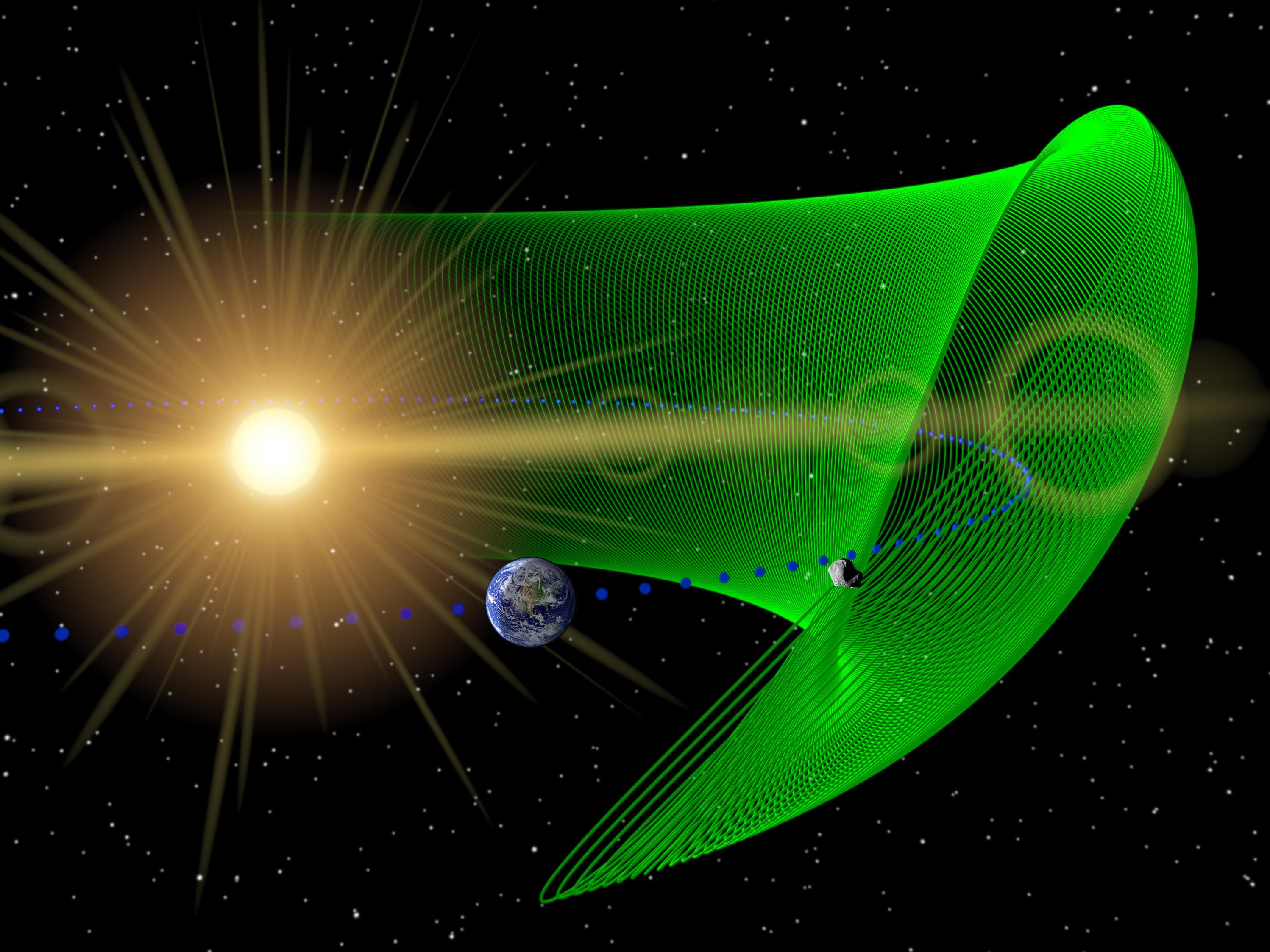
2010 TK_{7}'s spiraling path (green) relative to Earth and its orbit (blue dots) over the course of half a tadpole loop; each spiral turn represents a year's motion

2010 TK_{7} has an absolute magnitude of luminosity (determinable because of its known location) of about 20.8. Based on an assumed albedo of 0.1, its estimated diameter is about 300 meters. No spectral data are yet available to shed light on its composition. 2010 TK_{7} would exert a surface gravitational force of less than 1/20,000 that of Earth.

At the time of discovery, the asteroid orbited the Sun with a period of 365.389 days, close to Earth's 365.256 days. As long as it remains in 1:1 resonance with Earth, its average period over long time intervals will exactly equal that of Earth. On its eccentric (e = 0.191) orbit, 2010 TK_{7}'s distance from the Sun varies annually from 0.81 AU to 1.19 AU. It orbits in a plane inclined about 21 degrees to the plane of the ecliptic.

Trojans do not orbit right at Lagrangian points but oscillate in tadpole-shaped loops around them (as viewed in a corotating reference frame in which the planet and Lagrangian points are stationary); 2010 TK_{7} traverses its loop over a period of 395 years. (Note: Because of its orbital inclination and eccentricity, 2010 TK_{7}'s position relative to Earth is actually a complicated, tightly coiled spiral; however, if its average position relative to Earth over a year is represented by a single point, that point will follow the tadpole loop.) 2010 TK_{7}'s loop is so elongated that it sometimes travels nearly to the opposite side of the Sun with respect to Earth. Its movements do not bring it any closer to Earth than 20 million kilometers (12.4 million miles), which is more than 50 times the distance to the Moon. 2010 TK_{7} was at the near-Earth end of its tadpole in 2010–2011, which facilitated its discovery.

2010 TK_{7}'s orbit has a chaotic character, making long-range predictions difficult. Prior to 500 AD, it may have been oscillating about the L_{5} Lagrangian point (60 degrees behind Earth), before jumping to L_{4} via L_{3}. Short-term unstable libration about L_{3}, and transitions to horseshoe orbits are also possible. Newer calculations based on an improved orbit determination confirm these results.

Animation of 2010 TK_{7} orbit from 1600 to 2500

Relative to Sun and Earth

Around Earth (with Sun)

Around Sun (with Earth)

Sun · Earth · 2010 TK_{7}

== Accessibility from Earth ==
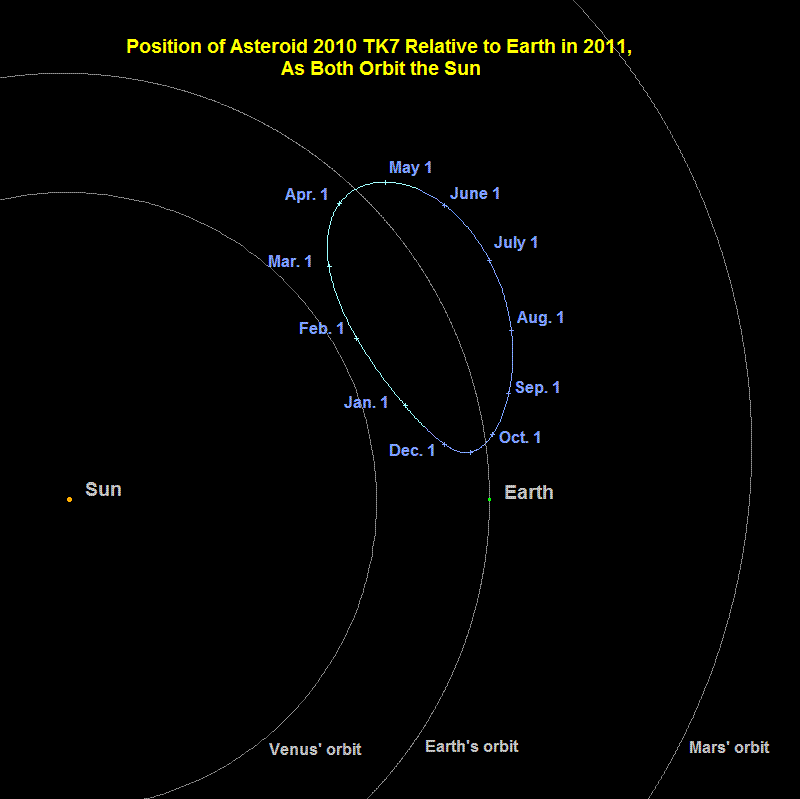
Position of 2010 TK_{7} relative to Earth in 2011

Effective potential plot showing Earth's Lagrangian points (not to scale); contours around L_{4} and L_{5} represent tadpole loop paths

Because Earth trojans share Earth's orbit and have little gravity of their own, less energy might be needed to reach them than the Moon, even though they are much more distant. However, 2010 TK_{7} is not an energetically attractive target for a space mission because of its orbital inclination: It moves so far above and below Earth's orbit that the required change in velocity for a spacecraft to match its trajectory coming from Earth's would be 9.4 km/s, whereas some other near-Earth asteroids require less than 4 km/s.

During the 5 December 2012 Earth close approach of 0.197 AU (29,500,000 km; 18,300,000 mi), the asteroid had an apparent magnitude of about 21.

== See also ==
- (614689) 2020 XL5, the second Earth trojan discovered
- Claimed moons of Earth
- Provisional designation in astronomy, the naming convention used for astronomical objects immediately following their discovery
