= 2011 SL25 =

Asteroid

2011 SL_{25}
Discovery
- Discovered by: Alianza S4
- Discovery site: Cerro Burek
- Discovery date: 21 September 2011

Designations
- Minor planet category: Martian L5

Orbital characteristics
- Epoch 13 January 2016 (JD 2457400.5)
- Uncertainty parameter 2
- Observation arc: 1637 days (4.48 yr)
- Aphelion: 1.698231 AU (254.0517 Gm)
- Perihelion: 1.349540 AU (201.8883 Gm)
- Semi-major axis: 1.523885 AU (227.9700 Gm)
- Eccentricity: 0.114409
- Orbital period (sidereal): 1.88 yr (687.11 d)
- Mean anomaly: 55.63918°
- Mean motion: 0° 31^{m} 26.159^{s} /day
- Inclination: 21.49603°
- Longitude of ascending node: 9.413048°
- Argument of perihelion: 53.31859°
- Earth MOID: 0.396438 AU (59.3063 Gm)
- Jupiter MOID: 3.52931 AU (527.977 Gm)

Physical characteristics
- Mean diameter: 550±230 m
- Geometric albedo: 0.5-0.05 (assumed)
- Absolute magnitude (H): 19.4

2011 SL_{25} is an asteroid and Mars trojan candidate that shares the orbit of the planet Mars at its L_{5} point.

== Discovery, orbit and physical properties ==
2011 SL_{25} was discovered on 21 September 2011 at the Alianza S4 Observatory (I08) on Cerro Burek in Argentina and classified as Mars-crosser by the Minor Planet Center. It follows a relatively eccentric orbit (0.11) with a semi-major axis of 1.52 AU. This object has noticeable orbital inclination (21.5°). Its orbit was initially poorly constrained, with only 76 observations over 42 days, but was recovered in January 2014. 2011 SL_{25} has an absolute magnitude of 19.5 which gives a characteristic diameter of 575 m.

== Mars trojan and orbital evolution ==
Recent calculations indicate that it is a stable L_{5} Mars Trojan with a libration period of 1400 yr and an amplitude of 18°. values as well as its short-term orbital evolution are similar to those of 5261 Eureka.

== Origin ==
Long-term numerical integrations show that its orbit is stable on Gyr time-scales (1 Gyr = 1 billion years). It appears to be stable at least for 4.5 Gyr but its current orbit indicates that it has not been a dynamical companion to Mars for the entire history of the Solar System.

== See also ==
- 5261 Eureka (1990 MB)
- (101429) 1998 VF31
- (121514) 1999 UJ7
- (311999) 2007 NS2
- (385250) 2001 DH47
- (816688) 2011 SC191
- 2009 SE
- 2011 SP189
- 2011 UB256
- 2011 UN63
- 2016 CP31
- 2018 EC4
- 2018 FC4
- 2020 VT1
