= 2018 EC4 =

Asteroid

2018 EC_{4}
Discovery
- Discovered by: Mt. Lemmon Survey
- Discovery date: 10 March 2018

Designations
- Minor planet category: Martian L5

Orbital characteristics
- Epoch 31 May 2020 (JD 2459000.5)
- Uncertainty parameter 0
- Observation arc: 3131 days (8.57 yr)
- Aphelion: 1.61579336 AU (241.719246 Gm)
- Perihelion: 1.43135923 AU (214.128293 Gm)
- Semi-major axis: 1.52357630 AU (227.923770 Gm)
- Eccentricity: 0.06052671
- Orbital period (sidereal): 1.88 yr (686.90193 d)
- Mean anomaly: 203.4934°
- Mean motion: 0° 31^{m} 26.732^{s} /day
- Inclination: 21.835796°
- Longitude of ascending node: 47.371564°
- Argument of perihelion: 344.1754°
- Earth MOID: 0.443437 AU (66.3372 Gm)
- Jupiter MOID: 3.54199 AU (529.874 Gm)

Physical characteristics
- Dimensions: 300 m
- Geometric albedo: 0.5-0.05 (assumed)
- Absolute magnitude (H): 20.1

2018 EC_{4} is a small asteroid and Mars trojan orbiting near the L_{5} point of Mars (60 degrees behind Mars on its orbit).

== Discovery, orbit and physical properties ==
2018 EC_{4} was first observed on 10 March 2018 by the Mt. Lemmon Survey, but it had already been imaged (but not identified as an asteroid) by the Pan-STARRS 1 telescope system at Haleakala on 29 October 2011. Its orbit is characterized by low eccentricity (0.061), moderate inclination (21.8°) and a semi-major axis of 1.52 AU. Upon discovery, it was classified as Mars-crosser by the Minor Planet Center. Its orbit is well determined as it is currently (January 2021) based on 70 observations with a data-arc span of 3,131 days. 2018 EC_{4} has an absolute magnitude of 20.1 which gives a characteristic diameter of 300 m.

== Mars trojan and orbital evolution ==
Recent calculations indicate that it is a stable L_{5} Mars trojan with a libration period of 1250 yr and an amplitude of 17°. These values are similar to those of 5261 Eureka and related objects and it may be a member of the so-called Eureka family.

== Mars trojan ==
L_{4} (leading):

- (121514) 1999 UJ7 †

L_{5} (trailing):

- 5261 Eureka (1990 MB) †
- (101429) 1998 VF31 †
- (311999) 2007 NS2 †
- (385250) 2001 DH47
- (816688) 2011 SC191
- 2009 SE
- 2011 SL25
- 2011 SP189
- 2011 UB256
- 2011 UN63
- 2016 CP31
- 2018 EC4
- 2018 FC4

== See also ==
- 2020 VT1
