= 2011 UB256 =

Asteroid

2011 UB_{256}
Discovery
- Discovered by: Pan-STARRS
- Discovery date: 29 October 2011

Designations
- Minor planet category: Martian L5

Orbital characteristics
- Epoch 31 May 2020 (JD 2459000.5)
- Uncertainty parameter 0
- Observation arc: 6265 days (17.15 yr)
- Aphelion: 1.631894031 AU (244.1278722 Gm)
- Perihelion: 1.4154896 AU (211.75423 Gm)
- Semi-major axis: 1.523691798 AU (227.9410486 Gm)
- Eccentricity: 0.0710132
- Orbital period (sidereal): 1.88 yr (686.980044 d)
- Mean anomaly: 180.60444°
- Mean motion: 0° 31^{m} 26.518^{s} /day
- Inclination: 24.30270°
- Longitude of ascending node: 58.781126°
- Argument of perihelion: 7.58178°
- Earth MOID: 0.428887 AU (64.1606 Gm)
- Jupiter MOID: 3.5641 AU (533.18 Gm)

Physical characteristics
- Mean diameter: 300 m
- Geometric albedo: 0.5-0.05 (assumed)
- Absolute magnitude (H): 19.9

2011 UB_{256} is a small asteroid and Mars trojan orbiting near the L_{5} point of Mars (60 degrees behind Mars on its orbit).

== Discovery, orbit and physical properties ==
2011 UB_{256} was first observed on 29 October 2011 by the Pan-STARRS 1 telescope system at Haleakala; the Apache Point-Sloan Digital Sky Survey had imaged this object on 31 March 2003 without identifying it as an asteroid. Its orbit is characterized by low eccentricity (0.071), moderate inclination (24.3°) and a semi-major axis of 1.52 AU. Upon discovery, it was classified as Mars-crosser by the Minor Planet Center. Its orbit is well determined as it is currently (January 2021) based on 64 observations with a data-arc span of 6265 days. 2011 UB_{256} has an absolute magnitude of 19.9 which gives a characteristic diameter of 300 m.

== Mars trojan and orbital evolution ==
Recent calculations indicate that it is a stable L_{5} Mars trojan. It may not be a member of the so-called Eureka family.

== Mars trojan ==
L_{4} (leading):

- (121514) 1999 UJ7 †

L_{5} (trailing):

- 5261 Eureka (1990 MB) †
- (101429) 1998 VF31 †
- (311999) 2007 NS2 †
- (385250) 2001 DH47
- (816688) 2011 SC191
- 2009 SE
- 2011 SL25
- 2011 SP189
- 2011 UB256
- 2011 UN63
- 2016 CP31
- 2018 EC4
- 2018 FC4

== See also ==
- 2020 VT1
