= 2018 FC4 =

Asteroid

2018 FC_{4}
Discovery
- Discovered by: Mt. Lemmon Survey
- Discovery date: 21 March 2018

Designations
- Minor planet category: Martian L5

Orbital characteristics
- Epoch 31 May 2020 (JD 2459000.5)
- Uncertainty parameter 0
- Observation arc: 790 days (2.16 yr)
- Aphelion: 1.5498684 AU (231.85701 Gm)
- Perihelion: 1.497823 AU (224.0711 Gm)
- Semi-major axis: 1.5238457 AU (227.96407 Gm)
- Eccentricity: 0.017077
- Orbital period (sidereal): 1.88 yr (687.0841 d)
- Mean anomaly: 4.660°
- Mean motion: 0° 31^{m} 26.232^{s} /day
- Inclination: 22.1437°
- Longitude of ascending node: 187.55390°
- Argument of perihelion: 52.009°
- Earth MOID: 0.507683 AU (75.9483 Gm)
- Jupiter MOID: 3.41333 AU (510.627 Gm)

Physical characteristics
- Dimensions: 200 m
- Geometric albedo: 0.5-0.05 (assumed)
- Absolute magnitude (H): 21.3

2018 FC_{4} is a small asteroid and Mars trojan orbiting near the L_{5} point of Mars (60 degrees behind Mars on its orbit).

== Discovery, orbit and physical properties ==
2018 FC_{4} was first observed on 21 March 2018 by the Mt. Lemmon Survey, but it had already been imaged (but not identified as an asteroid) by the Pan-STARRS 1 telescope system at Haleakala on the previous night. Its orbit is characterized by very low eccentricity (0.017), moderate inclination (22.1°) and a semi-major axis of 1.52 AU. Upon discovery, it was classified as Mars-crosser by the Minor Planet Center. Its orbit is reasonably well determined as it is currently (January 2021) based on 35 observations with a data-arc span of 790 days. 2018 FC_{4} has an absolute magnitude of 21.3 which gives a characteristic diameter of 200 m.

== Mars trojan and orbital evolution ==
Recent calculations indicate that it is a stable L_{5} Mars trojan with a libration period of 1300 yr and an amplitude of 20°. These values are similar to those of 5261 Eureka and related objects and it may be a member of the so-called Eureka family.

== Mars trojan ==
L_{4} (leading):

- (121514) 1999 UJ7 †

L_{5} (trailing):

- 5261 Eureka (1990 MB) †
- (101429) 1998 VF31 †
- (311999) 2007 NS2 †
- (385250) 2001 DH47
- (816688) 2011 SC191
- 2009 SE
- 2011 SL25
- 2011 SP189
- 2011 UB256
- 2011 UN63
- 2016 CP31
- 2018 EC4
- 2018 FC4

== See also ==
- 2020 VT1
