= (121514) 1999 UJ7 =

Mars trojan asteroid

(121514) 1999 UJ_{7}
Discovery
- Discovered by: 30 October 1999 by LINEAR
- Discovery site: Socorro
- Discovery date: 30 October 1999

Designations
- Alternative designations: 2002 AC_{180}
- Minor planet category: Martian L4

Orbital characteristics
- Epoch 13 January 2016 (JD 2457400.5)
- Uncertainty parameter 0
- Observation arc: 21861 days (59.85 yr)
- Aphelion: 1.5843517 AU (237.01564 Gm)
- Perihelion: 1.4644704 AU (219.08165 Gm)
- Semi-major axis: 1.5244110 AU (228.04864 Gm)
- Eccentricity: 0.0393206
- Orbital period (sidereal): 1.88 yr (687.47 d)
- Mean anomaly: 229.9277°
- Mean motion: 0° 31^{m} 25.183^{s} / day
- Inclination: 16.75044°
- Longitude of ascending node: 347.37714°
- Argument of perihelion: 48.35771°
- Earth MOID: 0.47372 AU (70.868 Gm)
- Jupiter MOID: 3.49473 AU (522.804 Gm)

Physical characteristics
- Dimensions: ~1 km
- Spectral type: X
- Absolute magnitude (H): 16.9

(121514) 1999 UJ_{7} is a small asteroid orbiting near the L_{4} point of Mars (60 degrees ahead Mars on its orbit). As of April 2024, it is one of only two known asteroids to orbit the leading L_{4} point of Mars—the other being 2023 FW14—although at least 15 other asteroids orbit Mars's trailing L_{5} point: The largest being 5261 Eureka, (101429) 1998 VF31, and 2007 NS2. Not only does (121514) 1999 UJ_{7} orbit on the other side of Mars from other similar asteroids, its spectrum is different as well, which is puzzling because all of the Martian trojans seem to be in very stable orbits.

== Orbit ==
Animation of 1999 UJ7 relative to Sun and Mars 1600-2500 Sun · 1999 UJ7 · Mars

(121514) 1999 UJ_{7} orbits around the L_{4} point of Mars. Its orbit is very stable and is large enough that the Yarkovsky effect will not affect its orbit.

== Physical characteristics ==
Due to similarity in the measured brightness of (121514) 1999 UJ_{7} with other Martian trojans, it is thought to be a small asteroid with an effective diameter on the order of 1 kilometer (0.62 mi). Its spectrum suggests that it is an X-type asteroid, which is different from 5261 Eureka and 1998 VF_{31}, and is somewhat puzzling since different mineral compositions suggest different origins for the two groups of asteroids. The long lifetime of the orbits for these asteroids makes the possibility of one or more of them being interlopers unlikely, however. This suggests that either one or more of the Martian trojans was captured in such a way as to give it a long-term stable orbit (and it is therefore not a primordial Martian asteroid), or that some fusion or combination of previous asteroids resulted in the presently observed ones. The Yarkovsky effect may provide a potential capture mechanism but not enough is known about the shapes of these objects to provide a useful Yarkovsky model.

== See also ==
- (385250) 2001 DH47
- (816688) 2011 SC191
- 2009 SE
- 2011 SL25
- 2011 SP189
- 2011 UB256
- 2011 UN63
- 2016 CP31
- 2018 EC4
- 2018 FC4
- 2020 VT1
