= 2011 SP189 =

Asteroid

2011 SP_{189}
Discovery
- Discovered by: Mt. Lemmon Survey
- Discovery date: 29 September 2011

Designations
- Minor planet category: Martian L5

Orbital characteristics
- Epoch 31 May 2020 (JD 2459000.5)
- Uncertainty parameter 0
- Observation arc: 2390 days (6.54 yr)
- Aphelion: 1.5852549 AU (237.15076 Gm)
- Perihelion: 1.462275 AU (218.7532 Gm)
- Semi-major axis: 1.5237649 AU (227.95198 Gm)
- Eccentricity: 0.040354
- Orbital period (sidereal): 1.88 yr (687.0295 d)
- Mean anomaly: 110.302°
- Mean motion: 0° 31^{m} 26.382^{s} /day
- Inclination: 19.89778°
- Longitude of ascending node: 0.663826°
- Argument of perihelion: 122.545°
- Earth MOID: 0.490971 AU (73.4482 Gm)
- Jupiter MOID: 3.40399 AU (509.230 Gm)

Physical characteristics
- Mean diameter: 300 m
- Geometric albedo: 0.5-0.05 (assumed)
- Absolute magnitude (H): 20.9

2011 SP_{189} is a small asteroid and Mars trojan orbiting near the L_{5} point of Mars (60 degrees behind Mars on its orbit).

== Discovery, orbit and physical properties ==
2011 SP_{189} was first observed on 29 September 2011 by the Mount Lemmon Survey. Its orbit is characterized by low eccentricity (0.040), moderate inclination (19.9°) and a semi-major axis of 1.52 AU. Upon discovery, it was classified as Mars-crosser by the Minor Planet Center. It is now classified as a Mars trojan. Its orbit is well determined as it is currently (January 2021) based on 45 observations with a data-arc span of 2390 days. 2011 SP_{189} has an absolute magnitude of 20.9 which gives a characteristic diameter of 300 m.

== Mars trojan and orbital evolution ==
Recent calculations indicate that it is a stable L_{5} Mars trojan with a libration period of 1300 yr and an amplitude of 20°. These values are similar to those of 5261 Eureka and related objects and it may be a member of the so-called Eureka family.

== Mars trojan ==
L_{4} (leading):

- (121514) 1999 UJ7 †

L_{5} (trailing):

- 5261 Eureka (1990 MB) †
- (101429) 1998 VF31 †
- (311999) 2007 NS2 †
- (385250) 2001 DH47
- (816688) 2011 SC191
- 2009 SE
- 2011 SL25
- 2011 SP189
- 2011 UB256
- 2011 UN63
- 2016 CP31
- 2018 EC4
- 2018 FC4

== See also ==
- 2020 VT1
