= (614689) 2020 XL5 =

Near-Earth Asteroid

(614689) 2020 XL_{5}
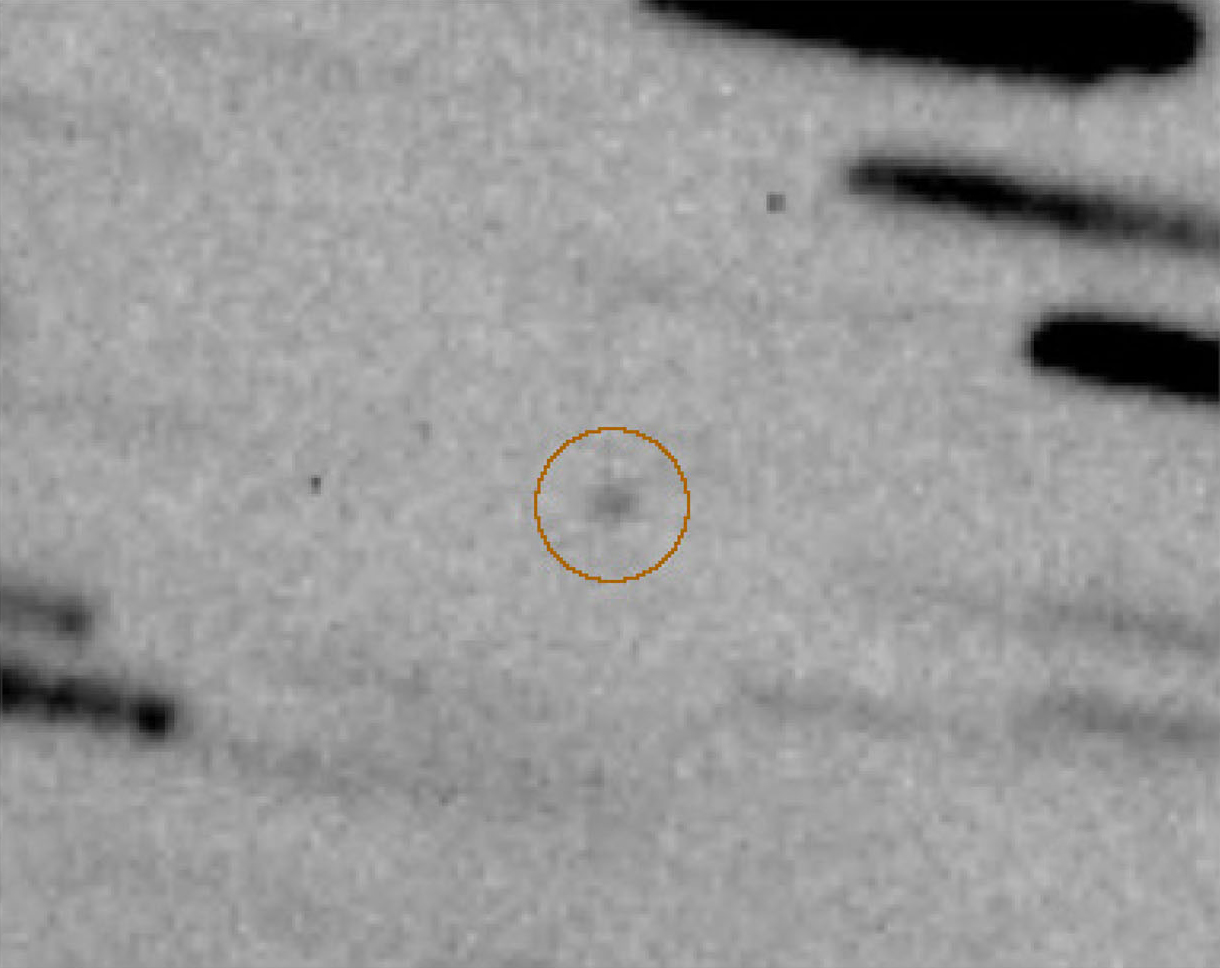
- 2020 XL_{5} imaged by the Lowell Discovery Telescope on 2 February 2021

Discovery
- Discovered by: Pan-STARRS 1
- Discovery site: Haleakala Obs.
- Discovery date: 12 December 2020

Designations
- Alternative designations: P11aRcq
- Minor planet category: Earth trojan · NEO; Apollo

Orbital characteristics
- Epoch 21 January 2022 (JD 2459600.5)
- Uncertainty parameter 0
- Observation arc: 8.88 yr (3,243 days)
- Earliest precovery date: 23 December 2012
- Aphelion: 1.388 AU
- Perihelion: 0.6133 AU
- Semi-major axis: 1.001 AU
- Eccentricity: 0.38713
- Orbital period (sidereal): 1.00 yr (365.7 d)
- Mean anomaly: 316.420°
- Mean motion: 0° 59^{m} 4.269^{s} / day
- Inclination: 13.847°
- Longitude of ascending node: 153.598°
- Argument of perihelion: 87.981°
- Earth MOID: 0.07571 AU (11,326,000 km)
- Venus MOID: 0.02726 AU (4,078,000 km)

Physical characteristics
- Mean diameter: 1.18±0.08 km
- Geometric albedo: 0.06±0.03
- Spectral type: C
- Apparent magnitude: 20–23
- Absolute magnitude (H): 18.58+0.16 −0.15 (r-band)

(614689) 2020 XL_{5} is a near-Earth asteroid and Earth trojan discovered by the Pan-STARRS 1 survey at Haleakala Observatory, Hawaii on 12 December 2020. It oscillates around the Sun–Earth L_{4} Lagrangian point (leading 60°), one of the dynamically stable locations where the combined gravitational force acts through the Sun's and Earth's barycenter. Analysis of 2020 XL_{5}'s trojan orbit stability suggests it will remain around Earth's L_{4} point for at least four thousand years until gravitational perturbations from repeated close encounters with Venus destabilize its trojan configuration. With a diameter of about 1.2 km (0.75 mi), 2020 XL_{5} is the second Earth trojan discovered, after (706765) 2010 TK7 (about 300 m (980 ft) in diameter), and is the largest of its kind known.

== Discovery ==
2020 XL_{5} was discovered by the Pan-STARRS 1 survey at Haleakala Observatory, Hawaii on 12 December 2020. It was first observed in the constellation Crater at an apparent magnitude of 21.4. The asteroid was moving at an on-sky rate of 3.02 arcseconds per minute, from a distance of 0.68 AU (102 million km; 63 million mi) from Earth.

The asteroid was subsequently listed on the Minor Planet Center's Near-Earth Object Confirmation Page (NEOCP) as P11aRcq. Over two days, follow-up observations were carried out by the Višnjan Observatory (L01), ESA Optical Ground Station (J04), and Cerro Tololo Observatory (807). The asteroid was identified in earlier Mount Lemmon Survey (G96) observations from 26 November 2020. The listing was confirmed and publicly announced as 2020 XL_{5} on 14 December 2020.

== Name and numbering ==
This minor planet was given the permanent number 614689 by the Minor Planet Center on 28 March 2022 and is now eligible for naming. In accordance with the International Astronomical Union's naming conventions for near-Earth objects, 2020 XL_{5} will be given a mythological name.

== Orbit and classification ==
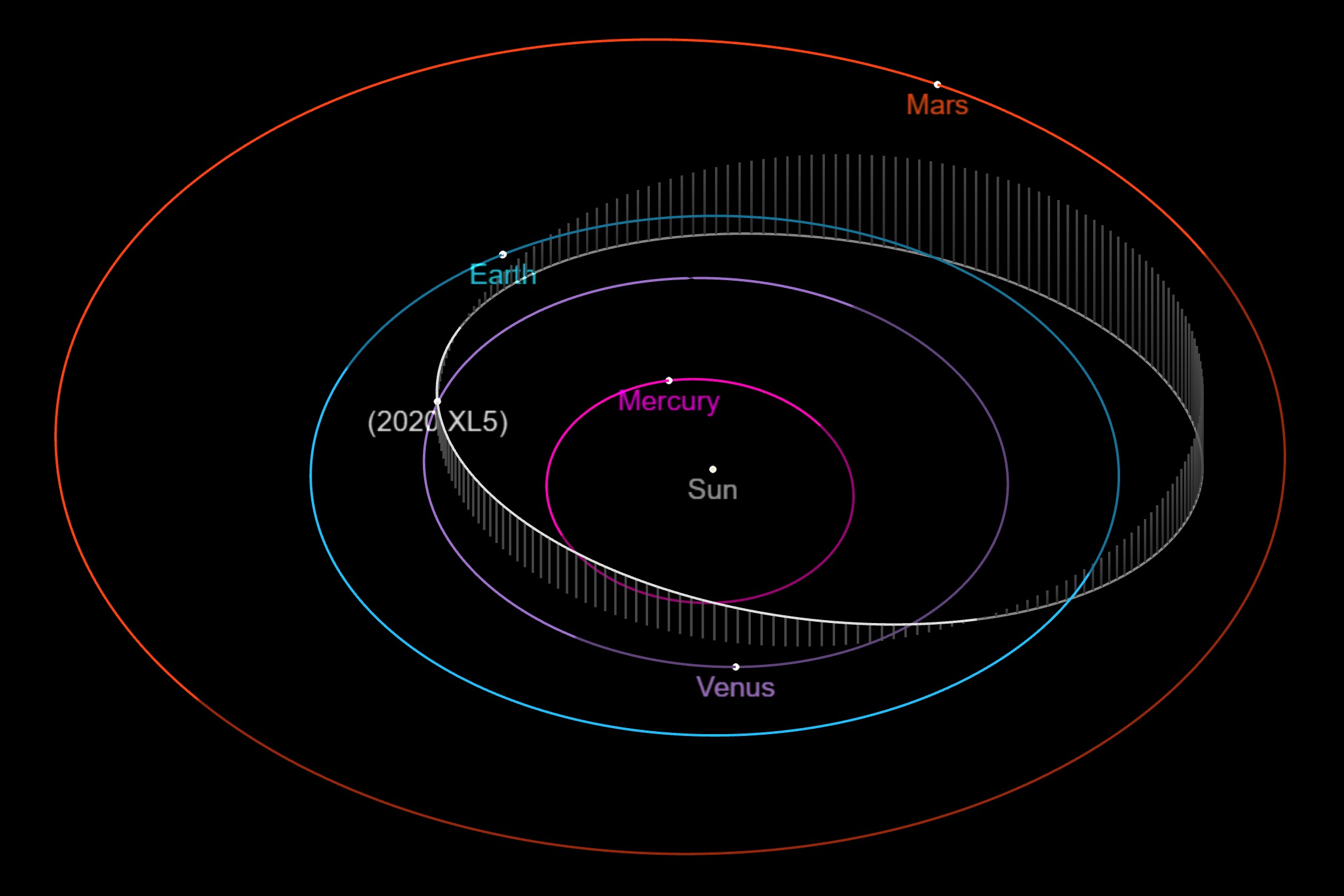
Heliocentric orbit diagram of 2020 XL_{5} along with the inner planets

The orbit of 2020 XL_{5} is well known with an uncertainty parameter of 0 and a long observation arc over 8 years. The asteroid has been identified in several precovery observations by various sky surveys, including Pan-STARRS, from dates as far back as December 2012.

2020 XL_{5} orbits the Sun at an average distance of 1.001 AU once every 365.8 days, or approximately 1 Earth year. Its orbit has a high eccentricity of 0.388 and an inclination of 13.8° with respect to the ecliptic plane. Over the course of its orbit, its distance from the Sun ranges from 0.61 AU at perihelion to 1.39 AU at aphelion, crossing the orbits of Venus and Earth. Since its orbit crosses Earth's while having a semi-major axis greater than 1 AU (by a small margin), 2020 XL_{5} is classified as an Apollo asteroid.

=== Trojan orbit ===
Effective potential plot showing Earth's Lagrangian points (not to scale); contours around L_{4} and L_{5} represent tadpole loop paths

Animation of 2020 XL_{5}'s orbit from 1600 to 2500 - relative to Sun and Earth Sun · Earth · 2020 XL_{5}

Trojan objects are most easily conceived as orbiting at a Lagrangian point, a dynamically stable location (where the combined gravitational force acts through the Sun's and Earth's barycenter) 60 degrees ahead of (L_{4}) or behind (L_{5}) a massive orbiting body, in a type of 1:1 orbital resonance. In reality, they oscillate around such a point.

On 26 January 2021, amateur astronomer Tony Dunn reported that 2020 XL_{5}'s nominal trajectory appears to be librating about Earth's leading L_{4} Lagrangian point, suspecting it to be an Earth trojan. Subsequent analysis confirmed modeling stability for at least several thousand years into the future based on existing orbital parameters. This would make 2020 XL_{5} more stable than the prototype L_{4} Earth trojan 2010 TK7, which is potentially unstable on timescales of less than 2,000 years. Additional follow-up observations and precoveries confirmed 2020 XL_{5}'s trojan nature, and showed that it will leave trojan orbit at least 4,000 years into the future. Numerical simulations indicate that 2020 XL_{5} has likely been captured into the L_{4} Langrangian point since the 15th century.

2020 XL_{5}'s high orbital eccentricity results in wide, tadpole-shaped oscillation paths in a corotating reference frame with Earth and its Lagrangian points. Although the asteroid crosses Venus's orbit with a minimum orbit intersection distance (MOID) of 0.0273 AU (4.1 million km; 2.5 million mi), perturbations by the planet are currently negligible since its nominal orbit brings it either too high or too low from the plane of Venus's orbit. Venus's influence on 2020 XL_{5}'s orbit will become greater over time as their longitudes of the ascending node precess over hundreds of years, lowering 2020 XL_{5}'s Venus MOID and eventually destabilizing its trojan orbit by sending it past Earth's L_{3} point in several thousand years.

== Physical characteristics ==
Photometric measurements of optical observations from 2020–2021 show that 2020 XL_{5} exhibits a color resembling that of carbonaceous C-type asteroids. Based on 2020 XL_{5}'s phase curve being similar to C-type asteroids, its absolute magnitude (H) of 18.6 corresponds to a mean diameter about 1.18 km (0.73 mi), calculated from a geometric albedo of 0.06 typical for C-type asteroids. This makes 2020 XL_{5} the largest Earth trojan asteroid known to date, being up to three times as large as (706765) 2010 TK_{7} whose size is 0.3 km (0.19 mi).

Because of its fixed position in Earth's sky, relative to the Sun, 2020 XL_{5} is only visible low on the horizon, during twilight. Accurate photometry of its light curve by terrestrial observers is made erratic by heavy atmospheric distortion and swamped by scattered light from the recently set Sun. Consequently, no information about its rotation has been determined.

== Exploration ==
Due to 2020 XL_{5}'s high orbital inclination, a rendezvous mission to the asteroid from low Earth orbit (LEO) would require a minimum total delta-v of 10.3 km/s (6.4 mi/s) – too high to be considered an ideal target for a low-energy trajectory. On the other hand, a flyby trajectory to 2020 XL_{5} from LEO could be more feasible with a minimum total delta-v of 3.3 km/s (2.1 mi/s).

== See also ==
- Co-orbital configuration
- Claimed moons of Earth
- Horseshoe orbit
- Quasi-satellite
