= 2016 CP31 =

Asteroid

2016 CP_{31}
Discovery
- Discovered by: Catalina Sky Survey
- Discovery date: 7 February 2016

Designations
- Minor planet category: Martian L5

Orbital characteristics
- Epoch 31 May 2020 (JD 2459000.5)
- Uncertainty parameter 0
- Observation arc: 1652 days (4.52 yr)
- Aphelion: 1.61311791 AU (241.319005 Gm)
- Perihelion: 1.4341118 AU (214.54007 Gm)
- Semi-major axis: 1.52361487 AU (227.929540 Gm)
- Eccentricity: 0.0587439
- Orbital period (sidereal): 1.88 yr (686.92802 d)
- Mean anomaly: 122.0549°
- Mean motion: 0° 31^{m} 26.661^{s} /day
- Inclination: 23.130505°
- Longitude of ascending node: 154.488290°
- Argument of perihelion: 329.2083°
- Earth MOID: 0.455015 AU (68.0693 Gm)
- Jupiter MOID: 3.39497 AU (507.880 Gm)

Physical characteristics
- Mean diameter: 400 m
- Geometric albedo: 0.5-0.05 (assumed)
- Absolute magnitude (H): 19.5

2016 CP_{31} is a small asteroid and Mars trojan orbiting near the L_{5} point of Mars (60 degrees behind Mars on its orbit).

== Discovery, orbit and physical properties ==
2016 CP_{31} was first observed on 7 February 2016 by the Catalina Sky Survey; the Pan-STARRS 1 telescope system at Haleakala had imaged this object on 14 January 2016 without identifying it as an asteroid. Its orbit is characterized by low eccentricity (0.059), moderate inclination (23.1°) and a semi-major axis of 1.52 AU. Upon discovery, it was classified as Mars-crosser by the Minor Planet Center. Its orbit is well determined as it is currently (January 2021) based on 131 observations with a data-arc span of 1652 days. 2016 CP_{31} has an absolute magnitude of 19.5 which gives a characteristic diameter of 400 m.

== Mars trojan and orbital evolution ==
Recent calculations indicate that it is a stable L_{5} Mars trojan. It may not be a member of the so-called Eureka family.

== Mars trojan ==
L_{4} (leading):

- (121514) 1999 UJ7 †

L_{5} (trailing):

- 5261 Eureka (1990 MB) †
- (101429) 1998 VF31 †
- (311999) 2007 NS2 †
- (385250) 2001 DH47
- (816688) 2011 SC191
- 2009 SE
- 2011 SL25
- 2011 SP189
- 2011 UB256
- 2011 UN63
- 2016 CP31
- 2018 EC4
- 2018 FC4

== See also ==
- 2020 VT1
