= (385250) 2001 DH47 =

Asteroid and Mars trojan

2001 DH_{47}
Discovery
- Discovered by: Spacewatch
- Discovery date: 20 February 2001

Designations
- Minor planet category: Martian L5

Orbital characteristics
- Epoch 13 January 2016 (JD 2457400.5)
- Uncertainty parameter 0
- Observation arc: 5521 days (15.12 yr)
- Aphelion: 1.5767436 AU (235.87749 Gm)
- Perihelion: 1.4708966 AU (220.04300 Gm)
- Semi-major axis: 1.5238201 AU (227.96024 Gm)
- Eccentricity: 0.0347308
- Orbital period (sidereal): 1.88 yr (687.07 d)
- Mean anomaly: 322.37107°
- Mean motion: 0° 31^{m} 26.279^{s} / day
- Inclination: 24.40220°
- Longitude of ascending node: 147.42225°
- Argument of perihelion: 17.54935°

Physical characteristics
- Mean diameter: 0.562 km
- Synodic rotation period: 3.97 h
- Geometric albedo: 0.5–0.05 (assumed)
- Absolute magnitude (H): 18.9

(385250) 2001 DH_{47} is a sub-kilometer asteroid and Mars trojan orbiting 60° behind the orbit of Mars near the L_{5} point.

== Discovery, orbit and physical properties ==
2001 DH_{47} was discovered on 1 February 2001 by the Spacewatch program, observing from Steward Observatory, Kitt Peak and classified as Mars-crosser by the Minor Planet Center. Its orbit is characterized by low eccentricity (0.035), moderate inclination (24.4º) and a semi-major axis of 1.52 AU. Its orbit is well determined as it is currently (March 2013) based on 45 observations with a data-arc span of 3,148 days. It has an absolute magnitude of 19.7 which gives a characteristic diameter of 562 m.

== Mars trojan and orbital evolution ==
It was identified as Mars trojan by H. Scholl, F. Marzari and P. Tricarico in 2005 and its dynamical half-lifetime was found to be of the order of the age of the Solar System. Recent calculations confirm that it is indeed a stable L_{5} Mars trojan with a libration period of 1365 yr and an amplitude of 11°. These values as well as its short-term orbital evolution are very similar to those of 5261 Eureka.

== Origin ==
Long-term numerical integrations show that its orbit is very stable on Gyr time-scales (1 Gyr = 1 billion years). As in the case of Eureka, calculations in both directions of time (4.5 Gyr into the past and 4.5 Gyr into the future) indicate that 2001 DH_{47} may be a primordial object, perhaps a survivor of the planetesimal population that formed in the terrestrial planets region early in the history of the Solar System.

== See also ==
- (101429) 1998 VF31
- (121514) 1999 UJ7
- (311999) 2007 NS2
- (816688) 2011 SC191
- 2009 SE
- 2011 SL25
- 2011 SP189
- 2011 UB256
- 2011 UN63
- 2016 CP31
- 2018 EC4
- 2018 FC4
- 2020 VT1
