= Calypso (moon) =

Trojan moon of Saturn

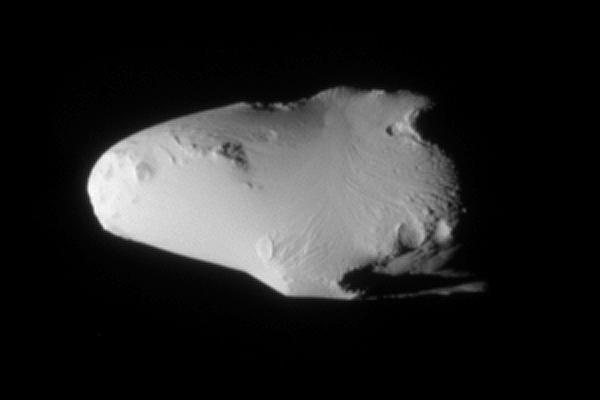
- Calypso image from Cassini (February 13, 2010)

Discovery
- Discovered by: Dan Pascu; P. Kenneth Seidelmann; William A. Baum; Douglas G. Currie
- Discovery date: March 13, 1980

Designations
- Designation: Saturn XIV
- Pronunciation: /kəˈlɪpsoʊ/
- Named after: Καλυψώ Kalypsō
- Alternative names: Tethys C S/1980 S 25
- Adjectives: Calypsoan /kælɪpˈsoʊ.ən/, Calypsonian /kælɪpˈsoʊniən/

Orbital characteristics
- Semi-major axis: 294670 km
- Eccentricity: 0.001
- Orbital period (sidereal): 1.88780 d
- Inclination: 1.50° (to Saturn's equator)
- Satellite of: Saturn

Physical characteristics
- Dimensions: 29.4 × 18.6 × 12.8 km (± 0.6 × 1.8 × 0.6 km)
- Mean diameter: 19.0±0.8 km
- Volume: 3591 km^{3} (Note: Calculated from Calypso's volume-equivalent sphere radius of 9.5±0.4 km given by Thomas et al. (2020))
- Mass: ≈2.5×10^{15} kg (Note: Calculated by multiplying Calypso's volume with its presumed density of 701 kg/m^{3}.)
- Mean density: ≈0.701 g/cm^{3} (Note: Density presumed from analyzing topographic features.)
- Surface gravity: ≈0.8–2.0 mm/s^{2}
- Escape velocity: ≈ 0.005 km/s at longest axis to ≈ 0.007 km/s at poles
- Synodic rotation period: synchronous
- Axial tilt: assumed zero
- Albedo: 1.34±0.10 (geometric)

Calypso is a natural satellite of Saturn. It was discovered in 1980, from ground-based observations, by Dan Pascu, P. Kenneth Seidelmann, William A. Baum, and Douglas G. Currie, and was provisionally designated S/1980 S 25 (the 25th satellite of Saturn discovered in 1980). Several other apparitions of it were recorded in the following months: S/1980 S 29, S/1980 S 30, S/1980 S 32, and S/1981 S 2. In 1983 it was officially named after Calypso of Greek mythology. (Note: Transactions of the International Astronomical Union, Vol. XVIIIA, 1982 (confirms Janus, names Epimetheus, Telesto, Calypso) (mentioned in IAUC 3872: Satellites of Jupiter and Saturn, September 30, 1983)) It is also designated Saturn XIV or Tethys C.

Calypso is co-orbital with the moon Tethys, and resides in Tethys's trailing Lagrangian point (L_{5}), 60 degrees behind Tethys. This relationship was first identified by Seidelmann et al. in 1981. The moon Telesto resides in the other (leading) Lagrangian point of Tethys, 60 degrees in the other direction from Tethys. Calypso and Telesto have been termed "Tethys trojans", by analogy to the trojan asteroids, and are half of the four presently known trojan moons.

Like many other small Saturnian moons and small asteroids, Calypso is irregularly shaped, has overlapping large craters, and appears to also have loose surface material capable of smoothing the craters' appearance. Its surface is one of the most reflective (at visual wavelengths) in the Solar System, with a visual geometric albedo of 1.34. This very high albedo is the result of the sandblasting of particles from Saturn's E-ring, a faint ring composed of small, water-ice particles generated by Enceladus's south polar geysers.

== Gallery ==
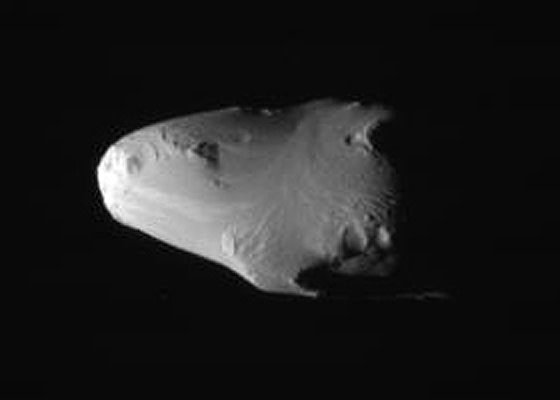
Another February 13, 2010 image showing flow-like albedo features

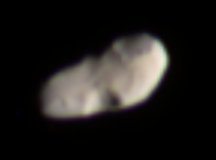
Cassini image from September 23, 2005

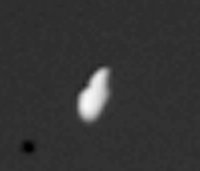
Calypso as seen by Voyager 2 (August 1981)

== See also ==
- List of natural satellites
