= 2011 UN63 =

Mars trojan asteroid

2011 UN_{63}
Discovery
- Discovered by: Mt. Lemmon Survey
- Discovery date: 21 October 2011

Designations
- Minor planet category: Martian L5

Orbital characteristics
- Epoch 13 January 2016 (JD 2457400.5)
- Uncertainty parameter 1
- Observation arc: 1587 days (4.34 yr)
- Aphelion: 1.6222522 AU (242.68547 Gm)
- Perihelion: 1.4253677 AU (213.23197 Gm)
- Semi-major axis: 1.5238099 AU (227.95872 Gm)
- Eccentricity: 0.0646027
- Orbital period (sidereal): 1.88 yr (687.06 d)
- Mean anomaly: 101.29418°
- Mean motion: 0° 31^{m} 26.298^{s} / day
- Inclination: 20.36086°
- Longitude of ascending node: 223.55542°
- Argument of perihelion: 165.28918°
- Earth MOID: 0.434823 AU (65.0486 Gm)
- Jupiter MOID: 3.54877 AU (530.888 Gm)

Physical characteristics
- Dimensions: 560 m
- Geometric albedo: 0.5–0.05 (assumed)
- Absolute magnitude (H): 19.7

2011 UN_{63} is a Mars trojan, an asteroid orbiting near the L_{5} point of Mars (60 degrees behind Mars on its orbit).

== Discovery, orbit and physical properties ==
2011 UN_{63} was first observed on 27 September 2009 by the Mt. Lemmon Survey and given the provisional designation 2009 SA_{170}. Lost, it was re-discovered on 21 October 2011 again by the Mt. Lemmon Survey. 2011 UN_{63} follows a low eccentricity orbit (0.064) with a semi-major axis of 1.52 AU. This object has moderate orbital inclination (20.4°). It was classified as Mars-crosser by the Minor Planet Center upon discovery. Its orbit is relatively well determined as it is currently (March 2013) based on 64 observations with a data-arc span of 793 days. This asteroid has an absolute magnitude of 19.7 which gives a characteristic diameter of 560 m.

== Mars trojan and orbital evolution ==
Recent calculations indicate that it is a stable L_{5} Mars trojan asteroid with a libration period of 1350 yr and an amplitude of 14°. These values as well as its short-term orbital evolution are similar to those of 5261 Eureka or 2011 SC191.

== Origin ==
Long-term numerical integrations show that its orbit is very stable on Gyr time-scales (1 Gyr = 1 billion years). As in the case of Eureka, calculations in both directions of time (4.5 Gyr into the past and 4.5 Gyr into the future) indicate that 2011 UN_{63} may be a primordial object, perhaps a survivor of the planetesimal population that formed in the terrestrial planets region early in the history of the Solar System.

== See also ==
- 5261 Eureka (1990 MB)
- (101429) 1998 VF31
- (121514) 1999 UJ7
- (311999) 2007 NS2
- (385250) 2001 DH47
- (816688) 2011 SC191
- 2009 SE
- 2011 SL25
- 2011 SP189
- 2011 UB256
- 2016 CP31
- 2018 EC4
- 2018 FC4
- 2020 VT1
