= (816688) 2011 SC191 =

Asteroid

(816688) 2011 SC_{191}
Discovery
- Discovered by: Mt. Lemmon Survey
- Discovery date: 31 October 2011

Designations
- Minor planet category: Martian L5

Orbital characteristics
- Epoch 13 January 2016 (JD 2457400.5)
- Uncertainty parameter 0
- Observation arc: 4715 days (12.91 yr)
- Aphelion: 1.5910690 AU (238.02053 Gm)
- Perihelion: 1.4565161 AU (217.89171 Gm)
- Semi-major axis: 1.5237925 AU (227.95611 Gm)
- Eccentricity: 0.0441507
- Orbital period (sidereal): 1.88 yr (687.05 d)
- Mean anomaly: 273.27420°
- Mean motion: 0° 31^{m} 26.331^{s} /day
- Inclination: 18.74554°
- Longitude of ascending node: 5.780691°
- Argument of perihelion: 196.33006°
- Earth MOID: 0.459583 AU (68.7526 Gm)
- Jupiter MOID: 3.37018 AU (504.172 Gm)

Physical characteristics
- Dimensions: 600 m
- Geometric albedo: 0.5-0.05 (assumed)
- Absolute magnitude (H): 19.3

(816688) 2011 SC_{191} is a small asteroid and Mars trojan orbiting near the L_{5} point of Mars (60 degrees behind Mars on its orbit).

== Discovery, orbit and physical properties ==
2011 SC_{191} was first observed on 21 March 2003 by the Near-Earth Asteroid Tracking (NEAT) project at Palomar Observatory using the Samuel Oschin telescope and given the provisional designation 2003 GX_{20}. The object was subsequently lost and re-discovered on 31 October 2011 by the Mt. Lemmon Survey. Its orbit is characterized by low eccentricity (0.044), moderate inclination (18.7°) and a semi-major axis of 1.52 AU. Upon discovery, it was classified as Mars-crosser by the Minor Planet Center. Its orbit is well determined as it is currently (March 2013) based on 45 observations with a data-arc span of 3,146 days. 2011 SC_{191} has an absolute magnitude of 19.3 which gives a characteristic diameter of 600 m.

== Mars trojan and orbital evolution ==
Recent calculations indicate that it is a stable L_{5} Mars trojan with a libration period of 1300 yr and an amplitude of 18°. These values as well as its short-term orbital evolution are similar to those of 5261 Eureka. Its eccentricity oscillates mainly due to secular resonances with the Earth and the oscillation in inclination is likely driven by secular resonances with Jupiter.

== Origin ==
Long-term numerical integrations show that its orbit is very stable on Gyr time-scales (1 Gyr = 1 billion years). As in the case of Eureka, calculations in both directions of time (4.5 Gyr into the past and 4.5 Gyr into the future) indicate that 2011 SC_{191} may be a primordial object, perhaps a survivor of the planetesimal population that formed in the terrestrial planets region early in the history of the Solar System.

== See also ==
- (101429) 1998 VF31
- (121514) 1999 UJ7
- (311999) 2007 NS2
- (385250) 2001 DH47
- 2009 SE
- 2011 SL25
- 2011 SP189
- 2011 UB256
- 2011 UN63
- 2016 CP31
- 2018 EC4
- 2018 FC4
- 2020 VT1
