= 2020 VT1 =

Near-Earth asteroid

2020 VT_{1}
Discovery
- Discovered by: Pan-STARRS1
- Discovery site: Haleakalā Obs.
- Discovery date: 10 November 2020

Designations
- Minor planet category: NEO–Amor

Orbital characteristics
- Epoch 31 May 2020 (JD 2459000.5)
- Uncertainty parameter 6 · 5
- Observation arc: 24 days
- Aphelion: 1.7774 AU
- Perihelion: 1.2687 AU
- Semi-major axis: 1.5231 AU
- Eccentricity: 0.1670
- Orbital period (sidereal): 1.88 yr (687 d)
- Mean anomaly: 315.41°
- Mean motion: 0° 31^{m} 27.84^{s} / day
- Inclination: 18.717°
- Longitude of ascending node: 50.169°
- Argument of perihelion: 296.19°
- Earth MOID: 0.3504 AU (136 LD)

Physical characteristics
- Mean diameter: 89 m (est. at 0.15)
- Absolute magnitude (H): 22.921 · 23.0

2020 VT_{1} is a small asteroid, classified as a near-Earth object of the Amor group, that is a temporary horseshoe companion to Mars.

== Discovery ==
2020 VT_{1} was discovered on 10 November 2020, by J. Bulger, K. Chambers, T. Lowe, A. Schultz, and M. Willman observing for the survey conducted by Pan-STARRS at Haleakalā Observatory, Hawaii. As of 20 January 2021, it has been observed 28 times with an observation arc of 24 days.

== Orbit and orbital evolution ==
2020 VT_{1} is currently an Amor asteroid, a subgroup of the near-Earth objects that approach the orbit of Earth from beyond, but do not cross it. It orbits the Sun at a distance of 1.3–1.8 AU once every 23 months (687 days; semi-major axis of 1.52 AU). Its orbit has a moderate eccentricity of 0.17 and an inclination of 19° with respect to the ecliptic. It is most notable for its horseshoe orbit, a complex co-orbital motion with Mars, as both bodies have similar semi-major axes. The object can also be classified as a Mars-crosser, intersecting the orbit of the Red Planet at 1.66 AU.

Animation of 2020 VT_{1} from 1600 to 2500

Relative to Sun and Mars

Around Mars

Around Sun

Sun · Mars · 2020 VT_{1}

== Mars trojan ==
L_{4} (leading):

- (121514) 1999 UJ7 †

L_{5} (trailing):

- 5261 Eureka (1990 MB) †
- (101429) 1998 VF31 †
- (311999) 2007 NS2 †
- (385250) 2001 DH47
- (816688) 2011 SC191
- 2009 SE
- 2011 SL25
- 2011 SP189
- 2011 UB256
- 2011 UN63
- 2016 CP31
- 2018 EC4
- 2018 FC4
