= (101429) 1998 VF31 =

Mars-crossing small asteroid

(101429) 1998 VF_{31}
Discovery
- Discovered by: LINEAR
- Discovery site: Socorro, New Mexico
- Discovery date: 13 November 1998

Designations
- Minor planet category: Martian L5 , Mars-crossing asteroid

Orbital characteristics
- Epoch 13 January 2016 (JD 2457400.5)
- Uncertainty parameter 0
- Observation arc: 7056 days (19.32 yr)
- Aphelion: 1.6771808 AU (250.90268 Gm)
- Perihelion: 1.3711043 AU (205.11428 Gm)
- Semi-major axis: 1.5241426 AU (228.00849 Gm)
- Eccentricity: 0.1004094
- Orbital period (sidereal): 1.88 yr (687.28 d)
- Mean anomaly: 301.39501°
- Mean motion: 0° 31^{m} 25.681^{s} / day
- Inclination: 31.295943°
- Longitude of ascending node: 221.31782°
- Argument of perihelion: 310.56601°

Physical characteristics
- Synodic rotation period: 17.2 h
- Spectral type: S
- Absolute magnitude (H): 17.2

(101429) 1998 VF_{31} is a sub-kilometer asteroid that orbits near Mars's L_{5} Lagrangian point, on average trailing 60° behind it. Its orbit is highly stable and was originally thought to be spectroscopically similar to 5261 Eureka, suggesting they may both be primordial Martian asteroids.

Spectroscopic observations through 2007 indicate that it has a large proportion of metal and achondrites on its surface (either with or without a mesosiderite contribution); which could also indicate that the surface regolith has undergone space weathering. These observations also reveal differences in the spectra with 5261 Eureka, suggesting they may not be related to each other after all.

1998 VF orbits the Sun once every 687 days (1.88 years) and completes a rotation on its axis every 7.70 hours.

== See also ==
- (121514) 1999 UJ7
- (311999) 2007 NS2
- (385250) 2001 DH47
- (816688) 2011 SC191
- 2009 SE
- 2011 SL25
- 2011 SP189
- 2011 UB256
- 2011 UN63
- 2016 CP31
- 2018 EC4
- 2018 FC4
- 2020 VT1
