= Mars trojan =

Celestial bodies that share the orbit of Mars

The L_{5} group (shown in green) and the L_{4} group (light blue) of Mars and Jupiter trojan asteroids shown along with the orbits of Jupiter and the inner planets. Mars is shown in red. The outer orbit is that of Jupiter.

Animation of 1999 UJ_{7} relative to Sun and Mars 1600–2500 Sun · 1999 UJ_{7} · Mars

Animation of 2007 NS_{2} relative to Sun and Mars 1600–2500 Sun · 2007 NS_{2} · Mars

The Mars trojans are a group of trojan objects that share the orbit of the planet Mars around the Sun. They can be found around the two Lagrangian points 60° ahead of and behind Mars. The origin of the Mars trojans is not well understood. One hypothesis suggests that they were primordial objects left over from the formation of Mars that were captured in its Lagrangian points as the Solar System was forming. However, spectral studies of the Mars trojans indicate this may not be the case. Another explanation involves asteroids chaotically wandering into the Mars Lagrangian points later in the Solar System's formation. This is also questionable considering the short dynamical lifetimes of these objects. The spectra of Eureka and two other Mars trojans indicates an olivine-rich composition. Since olivine-rich objects are rare in the asteroid belt it has been suggested that some of the Mars trojans are captured debris from a large orbit-altering impact on Mars when it encountered a planetary embryo.

Presently, this group contains 17 asteroids confirmed to be stable Mars trojans by long-term numerical simulations but only nine of them are accepted by the Minor Planet Center.

Due to close orbital similarities, most of the smaller members of the L_{5} group are hypothesized to be fragments of Eureka that were detached after the YORP effect accelerated Eureka's rotational period to the present 2.69 hours. The L_{4} trojan (121514) 1999 UJ7 has a much longer rotational period of ~50 h, apparently due to a chaotic rotation that prevents YORP spinup. The spectrum of 1999 UJ_{7} show a certain resemblance to that of 2023 FW_{14} and a common origin cannot be discarded. The spectra of 1999 UJ_{7} and 2023 FW_{14} are very different from those of the Eureka asteroid family members.

== List ==
List of Mars trojans
Designation	Cloud	Semimajor axis (AU)	Perihelion (AU)	Eccentricity	Inclination (°)	(H)	Diameter (m)
5261 Eureka	L_{5}	1.52356	1.42477	0.06484	20.2820	16.13	1880±230
(101429) 1998 VF31	L_{5}	1.52429	1.37150	0.10024	31.2987	17.26	1210+890 −350
(121514) 1999 UJ7	L_{4}	1.52455	1.46491	0.03912	16.7493	17.19	2450±490
(311999) 2007 NS2	L_{5}	1.52379	1.44155	0.05397	18.6194	18.18	790+580 −230
(385250) 2001 DH47	L_{5}	1.52385	1.47111	0.03461	24.4006	18.89	570+420 −170
(816688) 2011 SC191	L_{5}	1.52390	1.45678	0.04405	18.7451	19.4	450+330 −130
2009 SE	L_{5}	1.52451	1.42524	0.06512	20.6263	19.9	360+260 −110
2011 SL25	L_{5}	1.52391	1.34938	0.11453	21.4953	19.5	430+320 −120
2011 SP189	L_{5}	1.52386	1.46247	0.04029	19.8994	20.9	230+160 −70
2011 UN63	L_{5}	1.52378	1.42521	0.06469	20.3635	19.7	390+290 −110
2011 UB256	L_{5}	1.52370	1.41550	0.07101	24.3023	19.9	360+260 −110
2016 AA165	L_{5}	1.52299	1.38650	0.08962	18.7202	20.39	290+210 −90
2016 CP31	L_{5}	1.52365	1.43425	0.05867	23.1314	19.4	450+330 −130
2018 EC4	L_{5}	1.52365	1.43138	0.06056	21.8362	20.0	340+250 −100
2018 FC4	L_{5}	1.52388	1.49781	0.01711	22.1466	21.2	200+140 −60
2018 FM29	L_{5}	1.52391	1.45196	0.04722	21.5004	21.11	210+150 −60
2023 FW14	L_{4}	1.52377	1.28284	0.15811	13.27271	21.59	318+493 −199

== See also ==
- Trojan (celestial body)
- Minor planets that orbit near trojan points
  - Venus trojan
  - Earth trojan
  - Jupiter trojan
  - Neptune trojan
