= 2013 VZ70 =

Centaur in a horseshoe orbit with Saturn

2013 VZ_{70}
Discovery
- Discovered by: OSSOS
- Discovery site: Mauna Kea Obs.
- Discovery date: 17 September 2017 (first observed only)

Designations
- Minor planet category: centaur · horseshoe

Orbital characteristics
- Epoch 1 July 2021 (JD 2459396.5)
- Uncertainty parameter 3 · 4
- Observation arc: 2.59 yr (946 d)
- Earliest precovery date: 9 August 2013
- Aphelion: 10.010 AU
- Perihelion: 8.2816 AU
- Semi-major axis: 9.1457 AU
- Eccentricity: 0.0945
- Orbital period (sidereal): 27.66 yr (10,102 d)
- Mean anomaly: 34.155°
- Mean motion: 0° 2^{m} 8.16^{s} / day
- Inclination: 12.053°
- Longitude of ascending node: 215.18°
- Argument of perihelion: 245.30°
- Saturn MOID: 0.33076 AU
- T_{Jupiter}: 3.150

Physical characteristics
- Mean diameter: 7.9 km (est. 0.09)
- Absolute magnitude (H): 13.74±0.330

2013 VZ_{70} is a centaur on a horseshoe co-orbital configuration with Saturn. It was first observed on 1 November 2013 by the Outer Solar System Origins Survey at Mauna Kea Observatory in Hawaii, United States. The discovery was announced on 23 August 2021.

2013 VZ_{70} is the first minor planet ever discovered in a horseshoe orbit with respect to Saturn. It orbits the Sun at a distance of 8.3–10.0 AU once every 27 years and 8 months (10,102 days; semi-major axis of 9.15 AU). Its orbit has an eccentricity of 0.09 and an inclination of 12° with respect to the ecliptic. Based on a generic magnitude-to-diameter conversion, assuming an albedo of 0.09, 2013 VZ_{70} measures approximately 7.9 kilometers (4.9 miles) in diameter for an absolute magnitude of 13.74.

The object may have an origin among the trans-Neptunian population. However, an analysis of its orbit within the context of those of the known satellites of Saturn suggests that 2013 VZ_{70} could be related to the Inuit group; on the other hand, the mutual nodal distances of 2013 VZ_{70} and the moons Fornjot and Thrymr are below the first percentile of the distribution.
