= (311999) 2007 NS2 =

Mars trojan

(311999) 2007 NS_{2}
Discovery
- Discovery site: Observatorio Astronómico de La Sagra
- Discovery date: 14 July 2007

Designations
- Minor planet category: Martian L5

Orbital characteristics
- Epoch 13 January 2016 (JD 2457400.5)
- Uncertainty parameter 0
- Observation arc: 6296 days (17.24 yr)
- Aphelion: 1.6061055 AU (240.26996 Gm)
- Perihelion: 1.4414495 AU (215.63778 Gm)
- Semi-major axis: 1.5237775 AU (227.95387 Gm)
- Eccentricity: 0.0540289
- Orbital period (sidereal): 1.88 yr (687.04 d)
- Mean anomaly: 29.476921°
- Mean motion: 0.5239885°/day
- Inclination: 18.62037°
- Longitude of ascending node: 282.49476°
- Argument of perihelion: 176.94930°

Physical characteristics
- Dimensions: 800–1600 m
- Absolute magnitude (H): 18.1

(311999) 2007 NS_{2} is an asteroid and Mars trojan orbiting near the L_{5} point of Mars.

== Discovery, orbit and physical properties ==
2007 NS_{2} was discovered on 14 July 2007, by the Observatorio Astronómico de La Sagra. Its orbit is characterized by low eccentricity (0.054), moderate inclination (18.6°) and a semi-major axis of 1.52 AU. Upon discovery, it was classified as Mars-crosser by the Minor Planet Center. Its orbit is well determined as it is currently (March 2013) based on 87 observations with a data-arc span of 4,800 days. 2007 NS_{2} has an absolute magnitude of 17.8, which gives a characteristic diameter of 870 m.

== Mars trojan and orbital evolution ==
Jean Meeus suspected that 2007 NS_{2} was a Mars Trojan, and this was confirmed by Reiner Stoss's analysis of two sets of observations dating from 1998 on the MPC database. It was confirmed to be a Mars Trojan numerically in 2012. Recent calculations confirm that it is a stable L_{5} Mars Trojan asteroid with a libration period of 1310 years and an amplitude of 14°. These values as well as its short-term orbital evolution are similar to those of 5261 Eureka. Out of all known Mars Trojans, it currently has the smallest relative (to Mars) semimajor axis, 0.000059 AU.

== Origin ==
Long-term numerical integrations show that its orbit is very stable on Gyr time-scales (1 Gyr = 1 billion years). As in the case of Eureka, calculations in both directions of time (4.5 Gyr into the past and 4.5 Gyr into the future) indicate that 2007 NS_{2} may be a primordial object, perhaps a survivor of the planetesimal population that formed in the terrestrial planets region early in the history of the Solar System.

Animation of 2007 NS_{2} relative to Sun and Mars 1600-2500 Sun · 2007 NS_{2} · Mars

== See also ==
- (101429) 1998 VF31
- (121514) 1999 UJ7
- (385250) 2001 DH47
- (816688) 2011 SC191
- 2009 SE
- 2011 SL25
- 2011 SP189
- 2011 UB256
- 2011 UN63
- 2016 CP31
- 2018 EC4
- 2018 FC4
- 2020 VT1
