= Effective potential =

Net potential energy encountered in orbital mechanics

The effective potential (also known as effective potential energy) combines multiple, perhaps opposing, effects into a single potential. In its basic form, it is the sum of the "opposing" centrifugal potential energy with the potential energy of a dynamical system. It may be used to determine the orbits of planets (both Newtonian and relativistic) and to perform semi-classical atomic calculations, and often allows problems to be reduced to fewer dimensions.

== Definition ==
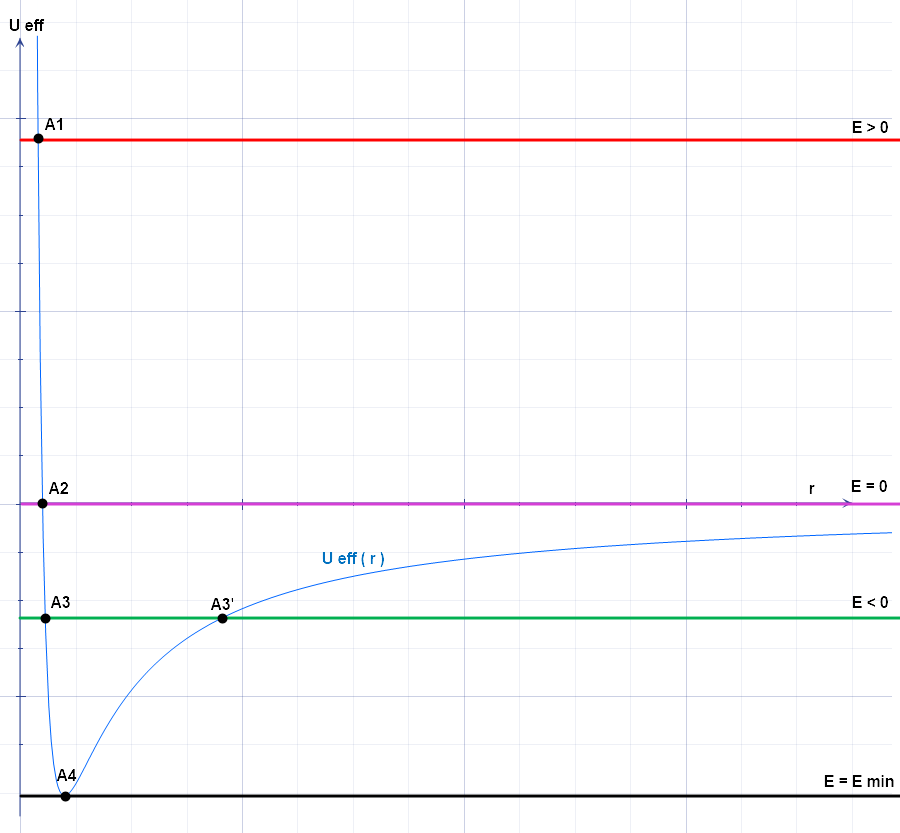
Effective potential. E > 0: hyperbolic orbit (A_{1} as pericenter), E = 0: parabolic orbit (A_{2} as pericenter), E < 0: elliptic orbit (A_{3} as pericenter, A_{3}' as apocenter), E = E_{min}: circular orbit (A_{4} as radius). Points A_{1}, ..., A_{4} are called turning points.

The basic form of the potential $U_\text{eff}$ is defined as
$$U_\text{eff}(\mathbf{r}) = \frac{L^2}{2 \mu r^2} + U(\mathbf{r}),$$
where

L is the angular momentum,
r is the distance between the two masses,
μ is the reduced mass of the two bodies (approximately equal to the mass of the orbiting body if one mass is much larger than the other),
U(r) is the general form of the potential.

The effective force, then, is the negative gradient of the effective potential:
$$\begin{align}
\mathbf{F}_\text{eff} &= -\nabla U_\text{eff}(\mathbf{r}) \\
&= \frac{L^2}{\mu r^3} \hat{\mathbf{r}} - \nabla U(\mathbf{r}),
\end{align}$$
where $\hat{\mathbf{r}}$ denotes a unit vector in the radial direction.

== Important properties ==
There are many useful features of the effective potential, such as
$$U_\text{eff} \leq E.$$

To find the radius of a circular orbit, simply minimize the effective potential with respect to $r$, or equivalently set the net force to zero and then solve for $r_0$:
$$\frac{d U_\text{eff}}{dr} = 0.$$
After solving for $r_0$, plug this back into $U_\text{eff}$ to find the maximum value of the effective potential $U_\text{eff}^\text{max}$.

A circular orbit may be either stable or unstable. If it is unstable, a small perturbation could destabilize the orbit, but a stable orbit would return to equilibrium. To determine the stability of a circular orbit, determine the concavity of the effective potential. If the concavity is positive,
$$\frac{d^2 U_\text{eff}}{dr^2} > 0,$$
the orbit is stable.

The frequency of small oscillations, using basic Hamiltonian analysis, is
$$\omega = \sqrt{\frac{U_\text{eff}''}{m}},$$
where the double prime indicates the second derivative of the effective potential with respect to $r$ and is evaluated at a minimum.

== Gravitational potential ==
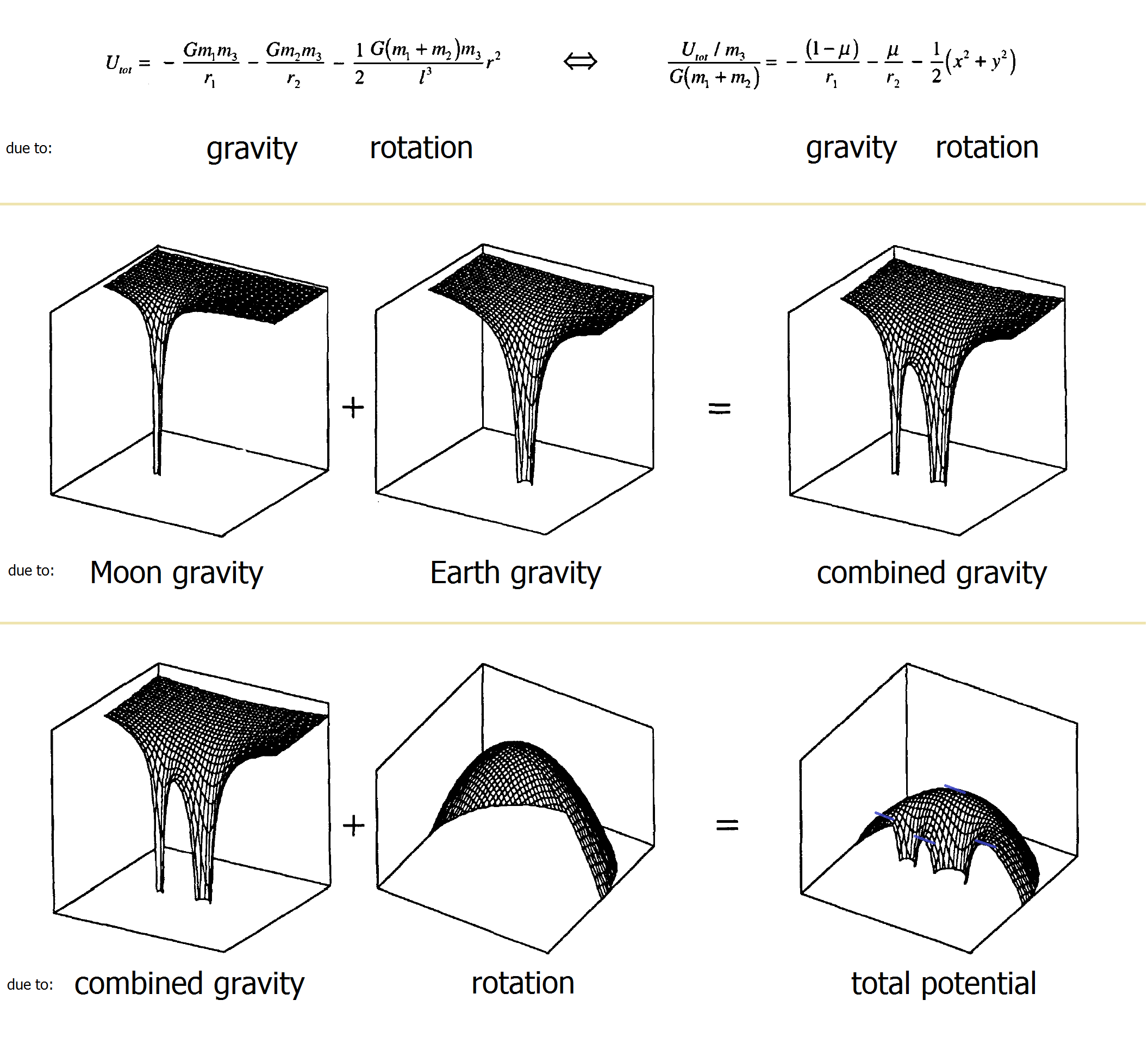
Components of the effective potential of two rotating bodies: (top) the combined gravitational potentials; (btm) the combined gravitational and rotational potentials

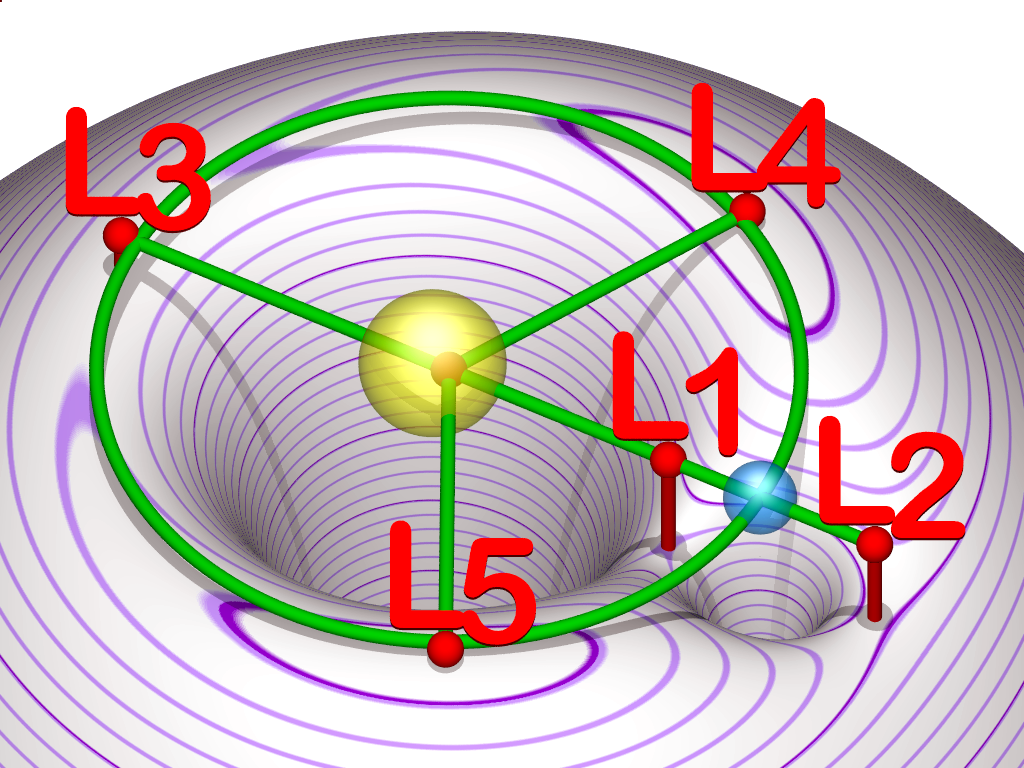
Visualisation of the effective potential in a plane containing the orbit (grey rubber-sheet model with purple contours of equal potential), the Lagrangian points (red) and a planet (blue) orbiting a star (yellow)

Consider a particle of mass m orbiting a much heavier object of mass M. Assume Newtonian mechanics, which is both classical and non-relativistic. The conservation of energy and angular momentum give two constants E and L, which have values
$$E = \frac{1}{2}m \left(\dot{r}^2 + r^2\dot{\phi}^2\right) - \frac{GmM}{r},$$
$$L = mr^2\dot{\phi},$$
when the motion of the larger mass is negligible. In these expressions,

$\dot{r}$ is the derivative of r with respect to time,
$\dot{\phi}$ is the angular velocity of mass m,
G is the gravitational constant,
E is the total energy,
L is the angular momentum.

Only two variables are needed, since the motion occurs in a plane. Substituting the second expression into the first and rearranging gives
$$m\dot{r}^2 = 2E - \frac{L^2}{mr^2} + \frac{2GmM}{r} = 2E - \frac{1}{r^2} \left(\frac{L^2}{m} - 2GmMr\right),$$
$$\frac{1}{2} m \dot{r}^2 = E - U_\text{eff}(r),$$
where
$$U_\text{eff}(r) = \frac{L^2}{2mr^2} - \frac{GmM}{r}$$
is the effective potential. (Note: A similar derivation may be found in José & Saletan, Classical Dynamics: A Contemporary Approach, pp. 31–33.) The original two-variable problem has been reduced to a one-variable problem. For many applications the effective potential can be treated exactly like the potential energy of a one-dimensional system: for instance, an energy diagram using the effective potential determines turning points and locations of stable and unstable equilibria. A similar method may be used in other applications, for instance, determining orbits in a general relativistic Schwarzschild metric.

Effective potentials are widely used in various condensed matter subfields, e.g. the Gauss-core potential (Likos 2002, Baeurle 2004) and the screened Coulomb potential (Likos 2001).

== See also ==
- Geopotential
