= 5261 Eureka =

Trojan asteroid of Mars

Discovery
- Discovered by: David H. Levy and Henry Holt
- Discovery date: 20 June 1990

Designations
- Pronunciation: /jʊˈriːkə/ yuurr-EE-kə
- Named after: Eureka
- Alternative designations: 1990 MB
- Minor planet category: Martian L5

Orbital characteristics
- Epoch 13 January 2016 (JD 2457400.5)
- Uncertainty parameter 0
- Observation arc: 13267 days (36.32 yr)
- Aphelion: 1.6222 AU (242.68 Gm)
- Perihelion: 1.4249 AU (213.16 Gm)
- Semi-major axis: 1.5236 AU (227.93 Gm)
- Eccentricity: 0.064766
- Orbital period (sidereal): 1.88 yr (686.89 d)
- Average orbital speed: 24.11 km/s
- Mean anomaly: 145.29°
- Mean motion: 0° 31^{m} 26.76^{s} / day
- Inclination: 20.280°
- Longitude of ascending node: 245.057°
- Argument of perihelion: 95.456°
- Known satellites: 1
- Earth MOID: 0.497052 AU (74.3579 Gm)
- Jupiter MOID: 3.52162 AU (526.827 Gm)
- T_{Jupiter}: 4.428

Physical characteristics
- Dimensions: 1.3 km ~2–4 km^{H}
- Synodic rotation period: 2.6902 h (0.11209 d)
- Geometric albedo: 0.39
- Temperature: ~250 K
- Spectral type: S(I) (Gaffey)
- Absolute magnitude (H): 16.0, 16.1

5261 Eureka is the first Mars trojan discovered. It was discovered by David H. Levy and Henry Holt at Palomar Observatory on 20 June 1990. It trails Mars (at the L_{5} point) at a distance varying by only 0.3 AU during each revolution (with a secular trend superimposed, changing the distance from 1.5–1.8 AU around 1850 to 1.3–1.6 AU around 2400). Minimum distances from Earth, Venus, and Jupiter, are 0.5, 0.8, and 3.5 AU, respectively.

Long-term numerical integration shows that the orbit is stable. Kimmo A. Innanen and Seppo Mikkola note that "contrary to intuition, there is clear empirical evidence for the stability of motion around the L_{4} and L_{5} points of all the terrestrial planets over a timeframe of several million years".

Since the discovery of 5261 Eureka, the Minor Planet Center has recognized three other asteroids as Martian trojans: (121514) 1999 UJ7 at the L_{4} point, (101429) 1998 VF31 at the L_{5} point, and (311999) 2007 NS2, also at the L_{5} point. At least five other asteroids in near-1:1 resonances with Mars have been discovered, but they do not exhibit trojan behavior. They are 2001 FR127, 2001 FG24, (36017) 1999 ND_{43}, 1998 QH56 and (152704) 1998 SD_{4}. Due to close orbital similarities, most of the other, smaller, members of the L_{5} group are hypothesized to be fragments of 5261 Eureka that were detached after it was spun up by the YORP effect (consistent with its rotational period of 2.69 h).

The infrared spectrum for 5261 Eureka is typical for an A-type asteroid, but the visual spectrum is consistent with an evolved form of achondrite called an angrite. A-class asteroids are tinted red in hue, with a moderate albedo. The asteroid is located deep within a stable Lagrangian zone of Mars, which is considered indicative of a primordial origin—meaning the asteroid has most likely been in this orbit for much of the history of the Solar System.

== Satellite ==
Satellite
Discovery
- Discovery date: 28 November 2011

Designations
- Designation: S/2011 (5261) 1

Orbital characteristics
- Epoch 9 December 2014
- Semi-major axis: 2.1 km
- Orbital period (sidereal): 0.7054 ± 0.0004 d

Physical characteristics
- Dimensions: 0.46 km

On 28 November 2011, a natural satellite of 5261 Eureka was found. This unnamed moon is about 0.46 km in diameter and orbits 2.1 km from Eureka. The satellite's existence was announced in September 2014.

== See also ==
- (101429) 1998 VF31
- (121514) 1999 UJ7
- (311999) 2007 NS2
- (385250) 2001 DH47
- (816688) 2011 SC191
- 2009 SE
- 2011 SL25
- 2011 SP189
- 2011 UB256
- 2011 UN63
- 2016 CP31
- 2018 EC4
- 2018 FC4
- 2020 VT1
