= 2009 SE =

Small asteroid and Mars trojan

Discovery
- Discovered by: Catalina Sky Survey
- Discovery date: 16 September 2009

Designations
- Minor planet category: Martian L5

Orbital characteristics
- Epoch 21 November 2025 (JD 2461000.5)
- Uncertainty parameter 0
- Observation arc: 5,498 days (15.05 yr)
- Aphelion: 1.623690 AU (242.9006 Gm)
- Perihelion: 1.425183 AU (213.2043 Gm)
- Semi-major axis: 1.524436 AU (228.0524 Gm)
- Eccentricity: 0.0651085
- Orbital period (sidereal): 1.88 yr (687.484 d)
- Mean anomaly: 208.166°
- Mean motion: 0° 31^{m} 25.136^{s} /day
- Inclination: 20.6248°
- Longitude of ascending node: 6.79202°
- Argument of perihelion: 354.169°
- Earth MOID: 0.42305 AU (63.287 Gm)
- Jupiter MOID: 3.53237 AU (528.435 Gm)

Physical characteristics
- Mean diameter: 400 m
- Geometric albedo: 0.5–0.05 (assumed)
- Absolute magnitude (H): 20.13

2009 SE is a small asteroid and Mars trojan orbiting near the L_{5} point of Mars (60 degrees behind Mars on its orbit).

== Discovery, orbit and physical properties ==
2009 SE was first observed on 16 September 2009 by the Catalina Sky Survey (CSS). Its orbit is characterized by low eccentricity (0.065), moderate inclination (20.6°) and a semi-major axis of 1.52 AU. Upon discovery, it was classified as Mars-crosser by the Minor Planet Center. Its orbit is well determined as it is currently (as of November 2025) based on 60 observations with a data-arc span of 5,498 days. 2009 SE has an absolute magnitude of 20.13 which gives a characteristic diameter of 400 m.

== Mars trojan and orbital evolution ==
Recent calculations indicate that it is a stable L_{5} Mars trojan with a libration period of 1430 yr and an amplitude of 70°. The libration amplitude is not similar to that of 5261 Eureka and related objects.

== See also ==
- 2020 VT1
