= Lagrange point =

Equilibrium points near two orbiting bodies

Lagrange points in the Sun–Earth system (not to scale). This view is from the north, such that Earth's orbit is counterclockwise.

A contour plot of the effective potential due to gravity and the centrifugal pseudo-force of a two-body system in a rotating frame of reference. The arrows indicate the downhill gradients of the potential around the five Lagrange points, toward them (red) and away from them (blue). Counterintuitively, the L_{4} and L_{5} points are the high points of the potential. At the points themselves these forces are balanced.

In celestial mechanics, the Lagrange points (/ləˈɡrɑːndʒ/), also called the Lagrangian points or libration points, are points of equilibrium for small-mass objects under the gravitational influence of two massive orbiting bodies. Mathematically, this involves the solution of the restricted three-body problem.

Normally, the two massive bodies exert an unbalanced gravitational force at a point, altering the orbit of any other celestial body at that point. At the Lagrange points, the gravitational forces of the two large bodies and the centrifugal pseudo-force balance each other. This can make Lagrange points an excellent location for satellites, as orbit corrections, and hence fuel requirements, needed to maintain the desired orbit are kept at a minimum.

For any combination of two orbital bodies, there are five Lagrange points, L_{1} to L_{5}, all in the orbital plane of the two large bodies. There are five Lagrange points for the Sun–Earth system, and five different Lagrange points for the Earth–Moon system. L_{1}, L_{2}, and L_{3} are on the line through the centers of the two large bodies, while L_{4} and L_{5} each act as the third vertex of an equilateral triangle formed with the centers of the two large bodies.

When the mass ratio of the two bodies is large enough, the L_{4} and L_{5} points are stable points, meaning that objects can orbit them and that they have a tendency to pull objects into them. Several planets have trojan asteroids near their L_{4} and L_{5} points with respect to the Sun; Jupiter has more than one million of these trojans.

Some Lagrange points are being used for space exploration. Two important Lagrange points in the Sun–Earth system are L_{1}, between the Sun and Earth, and L_{2}, on the same line at the opposite side of the Earth; both are well outside the Moon's orbit. The Deep Space Climate Observatory (DSCOVR), an artificial satellite, is located at L_{1} to study solar wind coming toward Earth from the Sun and to monitor Earth's climate by taking images of it. The James Webb Space Telescope (JWST), a powerful infrared space observatory, is located at L_{2}. This allows the satellite's sunshield to protect the telescope from the light and heat of the Sun, Earth and Moon simultaneously with no need to rotate the sunshield. The Nancy Grace Roman Space Telescope launched from NASA’s Kennedy Space Center to L_{2} on 30 August 2026. The L_{1} and L_{2} Lagrange points are located about 1,500,000 km from Earth.

The European Space Agency's earlier Gaia telescope, and its newly launched Euclid, also occupy orbits around L_{2}. Gaia keeps a tighter Lissajous orbit around L_{2}, while Euclid follows a halo orbit similar to JWST. Each of the space observatories benefits from being far enough from Earth's shadow to utilize solar panels for power, from not needing much power or propellant for station-keeping, from not being subjected to the Earth's magnetospheric effects, and from having direct line-of-sight to Earth for data transfer.

== History ==
The three collinear Lagrange points (L_{1}, L_{2}, L_{3}) were discovered by the Swiss mathematician Leonhard Euler around 1750, a decade before the Italian-born French physicist Joseph-Louis Lagrange discovered the remaining two (L_{4} and L_{5}).

In 1772, Lagrange published an "Essay on the three-body problem". In the first chapter he considered the general three-body problem. From that, in the second chapter, he demonstrated two special constant-pattern solutions, the collinear and the equilateral, for any three masses, with circular orbits.

== Lagrange points ==
The five Lagrange points are labeled and defined as follows:

=== L_{1} point ===
The L_{1} point lies on the line defined between the two large masses M_{1} and M_{2}. It is the point where the gravitational attraction of M_{2} and that of M_{1} combine to produce an equilibrium. An object that orbits the Sun more closely than Earth would typically have a shorter orbital period than Earth, but that ignores the effect of Earth's gravitational pull. If the object is directly between Earth and the Sun, then Earth's gravity counteracts some of the Sun's pull on the object, increasing the object's orbital period. The closer to Earth the object is, the greater this effect is. At the L_{1} point, the object's orbital period becomes exactly equal to Earth's orbital period. L_{1} is about 1.5 million kilometers, or 0.01 au, from Earth in the direction of the Sun.

=== L_{2} point ===
The L_{2} point lies on the line through the two large masses beyond the smaller of the two. Here, the combined gravitational forces of the two large masses balance the centrifugal force on a body at L_{2}. On the opposite side of Earth from the Sun, the orbital period of an object would normally be greater than Earth's. The extra pull of Earth's gravity decreases the object's orbital period, and at the L_{2} point, that orbital period becomes equal to Earth's. Like L_{1}, L_{2} is about 1.5 million kilometers or 0.01 au from Earth (away from the sun). Examples of spacecraft designed to operate near the Earth–Sun L_{2} are the Webb and Roman space telescopes. Earlier examples include the Wilkinson Microwave Anisotropy Probe and its successor, Planck.

=== L_{3} point ===
The L_{3} point lies on the line defined by the two large masses, beyond the larger of the two. Within the Sun–Earth system, the L_{3} point exists on the opposite side of the Sun, a little outside Earth's orbit and slightly farther from the barycenter of the Earth–Sun system than Earth is. This placement occurs because the Sun is also affected by Earth's gravity and so orbits around the two bodies' barycenter, which is well inside the body of the Sun. An object at Earth's distance from the Sun would have an orbital period of one year if only the Sun's gravity is considered. But an object on the opposite side of the Sun from Earth and directly in line with both "feels" Earth's gravity adding slightly to the Sun's and therefore must orbit a little farther from the barycenter of Earth and Sun in order to have the same 1-year period. It is at the L_{3} point that the combined pull of Earth and Sun causes the object to orbit with the same period as Earth, in effect orbiting an Earth+Sun mass with the Earth-Sun barycenter at one focus of its orbit. For the above argument, it is important to distinguish between the center of the Sun and the Earth-Sun barycenter. The distance between the L_{3} point and the center of the Sun is actually smaller than the distance between the center of the Earth and the center of the Sun.

=== L_{4} and L_{5} points ===
Gravitational accelerations at L_{4}

The L_{4} and L_{5} points lie at the third vertices of the two equilateral triangles in the plane of orbit whose common base is the line between the centers of the two masses, such that the point lies 60° ahead of (L_{4}) or behind (L_{5}) the smaller mass with regard to its orbit around the larger mass.

=== Stability ===
The triangular points (L_{4} and L_{5}) are stable equilibria, provided that the ratio of M_{1}/M_{2} is greater than 24.96. (Note: Actually ((25 + 3√69))/2 ≈ 24.9599357944 (sequence A230242 in the OEIS)) This is the case for the Sun–Earth system, the Sun–Jupiter system, and, by a smaller margin, the Earth–Moon system. When a body at these points is perturbed, it moves away from the point, but the factor opposite of that which is increased or decreased by the perturbation (either gravity or angular momentum-induced speed) will also increase or decrease, bending the object's path into a stable, kidney bean-shaped orbit around the point (as seen in the corotating frame of reference).

The points L_{1}, L_{2}, and L_{3} are positions of unstable equilibrium. Any object orbiting at L_{1}, L_{2}, or L_{3} will tend to fall out of orbit; it is therefore rare to find natural objects there, and spacecraft inhabiting these areas must employ a small but critical amount of station keeping in order to maintain their position.

== Natural objects at Lagrange points ==
Due to the natural stability of L_{4} and L_{5}, it is common for natural objects to be found orbiting in those Lagrange points of planetary systems. Objects that inhabit those points are generically referred to as 'trojans' or 'trojan asteroids'. The name derives from the names that were given to asteroids discovered orbiting at the Sun–Jupiter L_{4} and L_{5} points, which were taken from mythological characters appearing in Homer's Iliad, an epic poem set during the Trojan War. Asteroids at the L_{4} point, ahead of Jupiter, are named after Greek (Achaean) characters in the Iliad and referred to as the "Greek camp". Those at the L_{5} point are named after Trojan characters and referred to as the "Trojan camp". Both camps are considered to be types of trojan bodies.

As the Sun and Jupiter are the two most massive objects in the Solar System, there are more known Sun–Jupiter trojans than for any other pair of bodies. However, smaller numbers of objects are known at the Lagrange points of other orbital systems:

- The Sun–Earth L_{4} and L_{5} points contain interplanetary dust and at least two asteroids, 2010 TK7 and 2020 XL5.
- The Earth–Moon L_{4} and L_{5} points contain concentrations of interplanetary dust, known as Kordylewski clouds. Stability at these specific points is greatly complicated by solar gravitational influence.
- The Sun–Neptune L_{4} and L_{5} points contain several dozen known objects, the Neptune trojans.
- Mars has four accepted Mars trojans: 5261 Eureka, 1999 UJ7, 1998 VF31, and 2007 NS2.
- Saturn's moon Tethys has two smaller moons of Saturn in its L_{4} and L_{5} points, Telesto and Calypso. Another Saturn moon, Dione, also has two Lagrange co-orbitals, Helene at its L_{4} point and Polydeuces at L_{5}. The moons wander azimuthally about the Lagrange points, with Polydeuces describing the largest deviations, moving up to 32° away from the Saturn–Dione L_{5} point.
- One version of the giant impact hypothesis postulates that an object named Theia formed at the Sun–Earth L_{4} or L_{5} point and crashed into Earth after its orbit destabilized, forming the Moon.
- In binary stars, the Roche lobe has its apex located at L_{1}; if one of the stars expands past its Roche lobe, then it will lose matter to its companion star, known as Roche lobe overflow.

Objects which are on horseshoe orbits are sometimes erroneously described as trojans, but do not occupy Lagrange points. Known objects on horseshoe orbits include 3753 Cruithne with Earth, and Saturn's moons Epimetheus and Janus.

== Physical and mathematical details ==
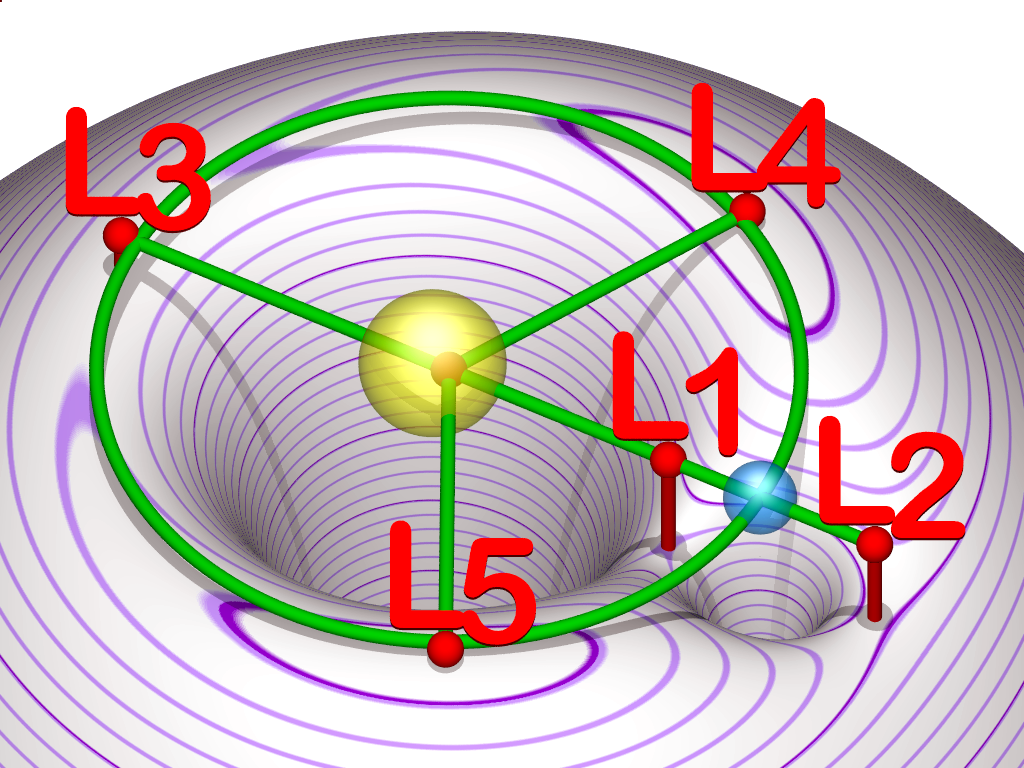
Visualization of the relationship between the Lagrange points (red) of a planet (blue) orbiting a star (yellow) counterclockwise, and the effective potential in the plane containing the orbit (grey rubber-sheet model with purple contours of equal potential). Click for animation.

Lagrange points are the constant-pattern solutions of the restricted three-body problem. For example, given two massive bodies in orbits around their common barycenter, there are five positions in space where a third body, of comparatively negligible mass, could be placed so as to maintain its position relative to the two massive bodies. This occurs because the combined gravitational forces of the two massive bodies provide the exact centripetal force required to maintain the circular motion that matches their orbital motion.

Alternatively, when seen in a rotating reference frame that matches the angular velocity of the two co-orbiting bodies, at the Lagrange points the combined gravitational fields of two massive bodies balance the centrifugal pseudo-force, allowing the smaller third body to remain stationary (in this frame) with respect to the first two.

=== L_{1} ===
The location of L_{1} is the solution to the following equation, gravitation providing the centripetal force:
$$\frac{M_1}{(R-r)^2}-\frac{M_2}{r^2}=\left(\frac{M_1}{M_1+M_2}R-r\right)\frac{M_1+M_2}{R^3}$$
where r is the distance of the L_{1} point from the smaller object, R is the distance between the two main objects, and M_{1} and M_{2} are the masses of the large and small object, respectively. The quantity in parentheses on the right is the distance of L_{1} from the center of mass. The solution for r is the only real root of the following quintic function

$$x^5 + (\mu - 3) x^4 + (3 - 2\mu) x^3 - (\mu) x^2 + (2\mu) x - \mu = 0$$
where
$$\mu = \frac{M_2}{M_1+M_2}$$
is the mass fraction of M_{2} and
$$x = \frac{r}{R}$$
is the normalized distance. If the mass of the smaller object (M_{2}) is much smaller than the mass of the larger object (M_{1}) then L_{1} and L_{2} are at approximately equal distances r from the smaller object, equal to the radius of the Hill sphere, given by:
$$r \approx R \sqrt[3]{\frac{\mu}{3}}$$

We may also write this as:
$$\frac{M_2}{r^3}\approx 3\frac{M_1}{R^3}$$
Since the tidal effect of a body is proportional to its mass divided by the distance cubed, this means that the tidal effect of the smaller body at the L_{1} or at the L_{2} point is about three times of that body. We may also write:
$$\rho_2\left(\frac{d_2}{r}\right)^3\approx 3\rho_1\left(\frac{d_1}{R}\right)^3$$
where ρ_{1} and ρ_{2} are the average densities of the two bodies and d_{1} and d_{2} are their diameters. The ratio of diameter to distance gives the angle subtended by the body, showing that viewed from these two Lagrange points, the apparent sizes of the two bodies will be similar, especially if the density of the smaller one is about thrice that of the larger, as in the case of the Earth and the Sun.

This distance can be described as being such that the orbital period, corresponding to a circular orbit with this distance as radius around M_{2} in the absence of M_{1}, is that of M_{2} around M_{1}, divided by √3 ≈ 1.73:
$$T_{s,M_2}(r) = \frac{T_{M_2,M_1}(R)}{\sqrt{3}}.$$

=== L_{2} ===
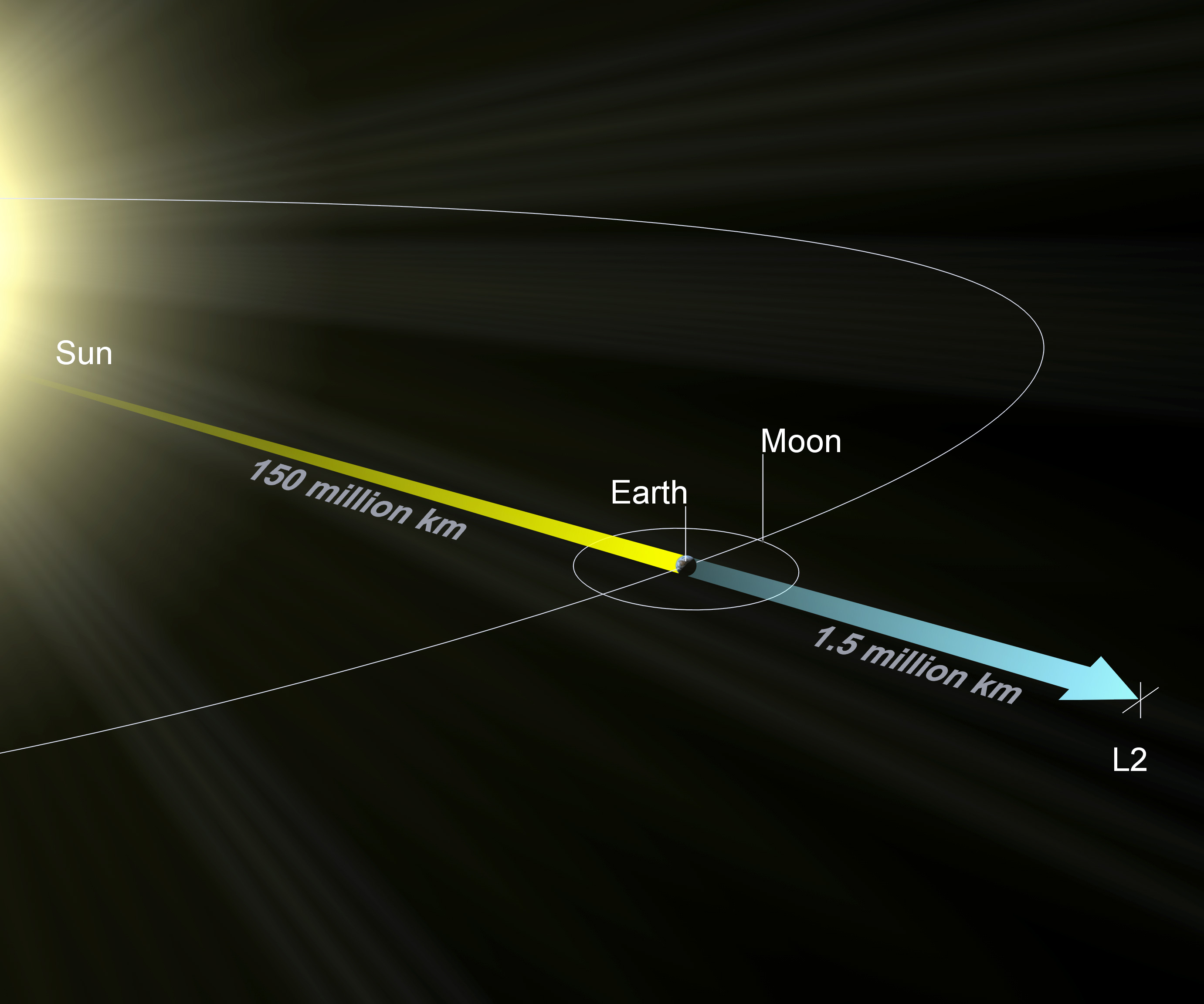
The Lagrangian L_{2} point for the Sun–Earth system

The location of L_{2} is the solution to the following equation, gravitation providing the centripetal force:
$$\frac{M_1}{(R+r)^2}+\frac{M_2}{r^2}=\left(\frac{M_1}{M_1+M_2}R+r\right)\frac{M_1+M_2}{R^3}$$
with parameters defined as for the L_{1} case. The corresponding quintic equation is
$$x^5 + x^4 (3 - \mu) + x^3 (3 - 2\mu) - x^2 (\mu) - x (2\mu) - \mu = 0$$

Again, if the mass of the smaller object (M_{2}) is much smaller than the mass of the larger object (M_{1}) then L_{2} is at approximately the radius of the Hill sphere, given by:
$$r \approx R \sqrt[3]{\frac{\mu}{3}}$$

The same remarks about tidal influence and apparent size apply as for the L_{1} point. For example, the angular radius of the Sun as viewed from L_{2} is arcsin(695.5×10^{3}/151.1×10^{6}) ≈ 0.264°, whereas that of the Earth is arcsin(6371/1.5×10^{6}) ≈ 0.242°. Looking toward the Sun from L_{2} one sees an annular eclipse. It is necessary for a spacecraft, like Gaia, to follow a Lissajous orbit or a halo orbit around L_{2} in order for its solar panels to get full sun.

=== L_{3} ===
The location of L_{3} is the solution to the following equation, gravitation providing the centripetal force:
$$\frac{M_1}{\left(R-r\right)^2}+\frac{M_2}{\left(2R-r\right)^2}=\left(\frac{M_2}{M_1+M_2}R+R-r\right)\frac{M_1+M_2}{R^3}$$
with parameters M_{1}, M_{2}, and R defined as for the L_{1} and L_{2} cases, and r being defined such that the distance of L_{3} from the center of the larger object is R − r. If the mass of the smaller object (M_{2}) is much smaller than the mass of the larger object (M_{1}), then:

$$r\approx R(1-\tfrac{5}{12}\mu).$$

Thus the distance from L_{3} to the larger object is less than the separation of the two objects (although the distance between L_{3} and the barycentre is greater than the distance between the smaller object and the barycentre).

=== L_{4} and L_{5} ===
The reason these points are in balance is that at L_{4} and L_{5} the distances to the two masses are equal. Accordingly, the gravitational forces from the two massive bodies are in the same ratio as the masses of the two bodies, and so the resultant force acts through the barycenter of the system. Additionally, the geometry of the triangle ensures that the resultant acceleration is to the distance from the barycenter in the same ratio as for the two massive bodies. The barycenter being both the center of mass and center of rotation of the three-body system, this resultant force is exactly that required to keep the smaller body at the Lagrange point in orbital equilibrium with the other two larger bodies of the system (indeed, the third body needs to have negligible mass). The general triangular configuration was discovered by Lagrange working on the three-body problem.

=== Radial acceleration ===
Net radial acceleration of a point orbiting along the Earth–Moon line

The radial acceleration a of an object in orbit at a point along the line passing through both bodies is given by:
$$a = -\frac{G M_1}{r^2}\sgn(r)+\frac{G M_2}{(R-r)^2}\sgn(R-r)+\frac{G\bigl((M_1+M_2) r-M_2 R\bigr)}{R^3}$$
where r is the distance from the large body M_{1}, R is the distance between the two main objects, and sgn(x) is the sign function of x. The terms in this function represent respectively: force from M_{1}; force from M_{2}; and centripetal force. The points L_{3}, L_{1}, L_{2} occur where the acceleration is zero — see chart at right. Positive acceleration is acceleration towards the right of the chart and negative acceleration is towards the left; that is why acceleration has opposite signs on opposite sides of the gravity wells.

== Stability ==
STL 3D model of the Roche potential of two orbiting bodies, rendered half as a surface and half as a mesh

Although the L_{1}, L_{2}, and L_{3} points are nominally unstable, there are quasi-stable periodic orbits called halo orbits around these points in a three-body system. A full n-body dynamical system such as the Solar System does not contain these periodic orbits, but does contain quasi-periodic (i.e. bounded but not precisely repeating) Lissajous orbits. These are what most of Lagrangian-point space missions have used until now. Although they are not perfectly stable, a modest effort of station keeping keeps a spacecraft in a desired Lissajous orbit for a long time.

For Sun–Earth-L_{1} missions, it is preferable for the spacecraft to be in a large-amplitude (100,000–200,000 km or 62,000–124,000 mi) Lissajous orbit around L_{1} than to stay at L_{1}, because the line between Sun and Earth has increased solar interference on Earth–spacecraft communications. Similarly, a large-amplitude Lissajous orbit around L_{2} keeps a probe out of Earth's shadow and therefore ensures continuous illumination of its solar panels.

The L_{4} and L_{5} points are stable provided that the mass of the primary body (e.g. the Earth) is at least 24.96 times the mass of the secondary body (e.g. the Moon), The Earth is over 81 times the mass of the Moon (the Moon is 1.23% of the mass of the Earth). Although the L_{4} and L_{5} points are found at the top of a "hill", as in the effective potential contour plot above, they are nonetheless stable. The reason for the stability is a second-order effect: as a body moves away from the exact Lagrange position, Coriolis acceleration (which depends on the velocity of an orbiting object and cannot be modeled as a contour map) curves the trajectory into a path around (rather than away from) the point. Because the source of stability is the Coriolis force, the resulting orbits can be stable, but generally are not planar, but "three-dimensional": they lie on a warped surface intersecting the ecliptic plane. The kidney-shaped orbits typically shown nested around L_{4} and L_{5} are the projections of the orbits on a plane (e.g. the ecliptic) and not the full 3-D orbits.

== Solar System values ==
Sun–planet Lagrange points to scale (Click for clearer points.)

This table lists sample values of L_{1}, L_{2}, and L_{3} within the Solar System. Calculations assume the two bodies orbit in a perfect circle with separation equal to the semimajor axis and no other bodies are nearby. Distances are measured from the larger body's center of mass (but see barycenter especially in the case of Earth-Moon and Sun-Jupiter) with L_{3} showing a negative direction. The percentage columns show the distance from the orbit compared to the semimajor axis. E.g. for the Moon, L_{1} is 326400 km from Earth's center, which is 84.9% of the Earth–Moon distance or 15.1% "in front of" (Earthwards from) the Moon; L_{2} is located 448900 km from Earth's center, which is 116.8% of the Earth–Moon distance or 16.8% beyond the Moon; and L_{3} is located −381700 km from Earth's center, which is 99.3% of the Earth–Moon distance or 0.7084% inside (Earthward) of the Moon's 'negative' position.

Lagrangian points in Solar System
Body pair	Semimajor axis, SMA (×10^{9} m)	L_{1} (×10^{9} m)	1 − L_{1}/SMA (%)	L_{2} (×10^{9} m)	L_{2}/SMA − 1 (%)	L_{3} (×10^{9} m)	1 + L_{3}/SMA (%)
Earth–Moon	0.3844	0.32639	15.09	0.4489	16.78	−0.38168	0.7084
Sun–Mercury	57.909	57.689	0.3806	58.13	0.3815	−57.909	0.000009683
Sun–Venus	108.21	107.2	0.9315	109.22	0.9373	−108.21	0.0001428
Sun–Earth	149.598	148.11	0.997	151.1	1.004	−149.6	0.0001752
Sun–Mars	227.94	226.86	0.4748	229.03	0.4763	−227.94	0.00001882
Sun–Jupiter	778.34	726.45	6.667	832.65	6.978	−777.91	0.05563
Sun–Saturn	1426.7	1362.5	4.496	1492.8	4.635	−1426.4	0.01667
Sun–Uranus	2870.7	2801.1	2.421	2941.3	2.461	−2870.6	0.002546
Sun–Neptune	4498.4	4383.4	2.557	4615.4	2.602	−4498.3	0.003004

== Spaceflight applications ==
=== Sun–Earth ===
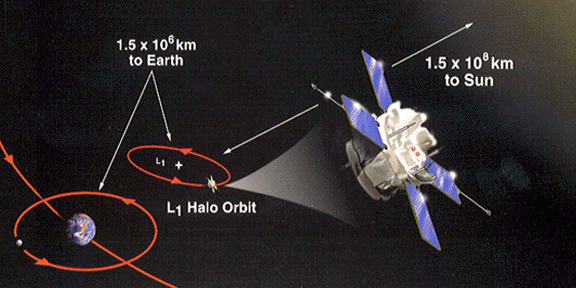
The satellite ACE in an orbit around Sun–Earth L_{1}

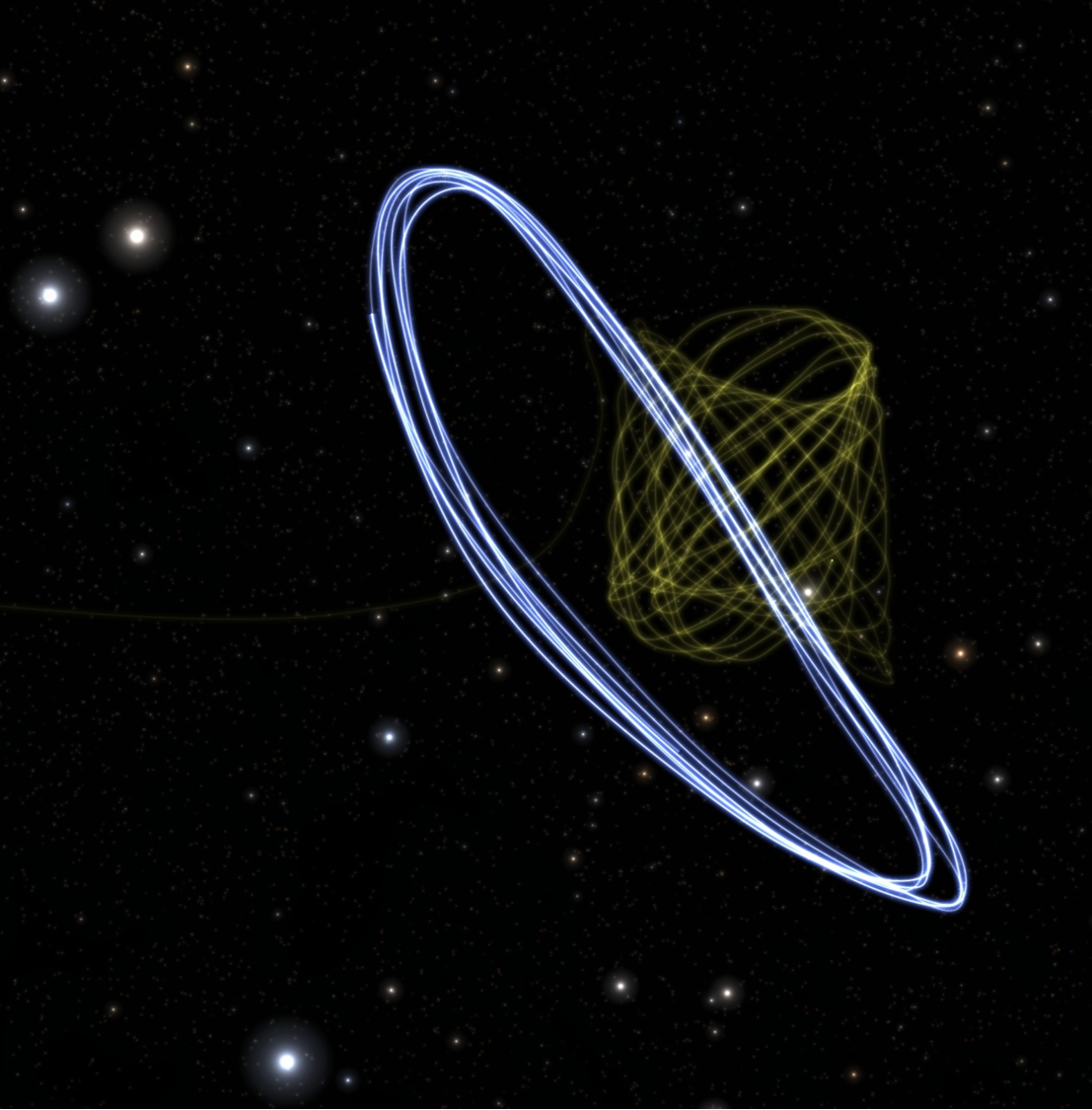
The Gaia (yellow) and James Webb Space Telescope (blue) orbits around Sun–Earth L_{2}

Sun–Earth L_{1} is suited for making observations of the Sun–Earth system. Objects here are never shadowed by Earth or the Moon and, if observing Earth, always view the sunlit hemisphere. The first mission of this type was the 1978 International Sun Earth Explorer 3 (ISEE-3) mission used as an interplanetary early warning storm monitor for solar disturbances. Since June 2015, DSCOVR has orbited the L_{1} point. Conversely, it is also useful for space-based solar telescopes, because it provides an uninterrupted view of the Sun and any space weather (including the solar wind and coronal mass ejections) reaches L_{1} up to an hour before Earth. Solar and heliospheric missions currently located around L_{1} include the Solar and Heliospheric Observatory, Wind, Aditya-L_{1} Mission and the Advanced Composition Explorer. Planned missions include the Interstellar Mapping and Acceleration Probe(IMAP) and the NEO Surveyor. Recently explored concepts have also included the positioning of a large occulting membrane at the L_{1} point, as part of a space-based solar radiation management solution to mitigate global warming.

Sun–Earth L_{2} is a good spot for space-based observatories. Because an object around L_{2} will maintain the same relative position with respect to the Sun and Earth, shielding and calibration are much simpler. It is, however, slightly beyond the reach of Earth's umbra, so solar radiation is not completely blocked at L_{2}. Spacecraft generally orbit around L_{2}, avoiding partial eclipses of the Sun to maintain a constant temperature. From locations near L_{2}, the Sun, Earth and Moon are relatively close together in the sky; this means that a large sunshade with the telescope on the dark-side can allow the telescope to cool passively to around 50 K – this is especially helpful for infrared astronomy and observations of the cosmic microwave background. The James Webb Space Telescope was positioned in a halo orbit about L_{2} on 24 January 2022.

Sun–Earth L_{1} and L_{2} are saddle points and exponentially unstable with time constant of roughly 23 days. Satellites at these points will wander off in a few months unless course corrections are made.

Sun–Earth L_{3} was a popular place to put a "Counter-Earth" in pulp science fiction and comic books, despite the fact that the existence of a planetary body in this location had been understood as an impossibility once orbital mechanics and the perturbations of planets upon each other's orbits came to be understood, long before the Space Age; the influence of an Earth-sized body on other planets would not have gone undetected, nor would the fact that the foci of Earth's orbital ellipse would not have been in their expected places, due to the mass of the counter-Earth. The Sun–Earth L_{3}, however, is a weak saddle point and exponentially unstable with time constant of roughly 150 years. Moreover, it could not contain a natural object, large or small, for very long because the gravitational forces of the other planets are stronger than that of Earth (for example, Venus comes within 0.3 AU of this L_{3} every 20 months).

A spacecraft orbiting near Sun–Earth L_{3} would be able to closely monitor the evolution of active sunspot regions before they rotate into a geoeffective position, so that a seven-day early warning could be issued by the NOAA Space Weather Prediction Center. Moreover, a satellite near Sun–Earth L_{3} would provide very important observations not only for Earth forecasts, but also for deep space support (Mars predictions and for crewed missions to near-Earth asteroids). In 2010, spacecraft transfer trajectories to Sun–Earth L_{3} were studied and several designs were considered.

=== Earth–Moon ===
Earth–Moon L_{1} allows comparatively easy access to lunar and Earth orbits with minimal change in velocity and this has as an advantage to position a habitable space station intended to help transport cargo and personnel to the Moon and back. The SMART-1 mission passed through the L_{1} Lagrangian Point on 11 November 2004 and passed into the area dominated by the Moon's gravitational influence.

Earth–Moon L_{2} has been used for a communications satellite covering the Moon's far side, for example, Queqiao, launched in 2018, and would be "an ideal location" for a propellant depot as part of the proposed depot-based space transportation architecture.

Earth–Moon L_{4} and L_{5} are the locations for the Kordylewski dust clouds. The L5 Society's name comes from the L_{4} and L_{5} Lagrangian points in the Earth–Moon system proposed as locations for their huge rotating space habitats. Both positions are also proposed for communication satellites covering the Moon like communication satellites in geosynchronous orbit cover the Earth.

=== Sun–Venus ===
Scientists at the B612 Foundation were planning to use Venus's L_{3} point to position their planned Sentinel telescope, which aimed to look back towards Earth's orbit and compile a catalog of near-Earth asteroids.

=== Sun–Mars ===
In 2017, the idea of positioning a magnetic dipole shield at the Sun–Mars L_{1} point for use as an artificial magnetosphere for Mars was discussed at a NASA conference. The idea is that this would protect the planet's atmosphere from the Sun's radiation and the solar wind.

== See also ==
- Co-orbital configuration – Configuration of two or more astronomical objects
- Euler's three-body problem – Problem in physics and astronomy
- Gegenschein – Optical effect of interplanetary dust reflections
- Interplanetary Transport Network – Low-energy trajectories in the Solar System
- Klemperer rosette – Type of gravitational system
- L_{5} Society – Society promoting space colonization
- Lagrange point colonization – Colonization of five equilibrium points in the orbit of planets or moons
- Lagrangian mechanics – Formulation of classical mechanics
- List of objects at Lagrange points
- Lunar space elevator – Proposed transportation system
- Oberth effect – Type of spacecraft maneuver
