= List of Solar System objects =

Euler diagram showing the types of bodies orbiting the Sun

The following is a list of Solar System objects by orbit, ordered by increasing distance from the Sun. Most named objects in this list have a diameter of 500 km or more.

- The Sun, a spectral class G2V main-sequence star
- The inner Solar System and the terrestrial planets
  - Mercury
    - Mercury-crossing minor planets
  - Venus
    - Venus-crossing minor planets
      - Zoozve, Venus' quasi-satellite
  - Earth
    - Moon
    - Near-Earth asteroids
      - 2021 PH27
      - Apophis
      - Eros
    - Earth trojans (2010 TK7)
    - Earth-crosser asteroids
      - Earth's quasi-satellites
  - Mars
    - Deimos
    - Phobos
    - Mars trojans
    - Mars-crossing minor planets
  - Asteroids in the asteroid belt, between the orbits of Mars and Jupiter
    - Ceres, a dwarf planet
    - Vesta
    - Pallas
    - Hygiea
    - Europa (asteroid)
    - Interamnia
    - Davida
    - Sylvia
    - Asteroids number in the hundreds of thousands. For longer lists, see list of exceptional asteroids, list of asteroids, or list of Solar System objects by size.
      - Asteroid moons
  - A number of smaller groups distinct from the asteroid belt
- The outer Solar System with the giant planets, their satellites, trojan asteroids and some minor planets
  - Jupiter
    - Rings of Jupiter
    - Complete list of Jupiter's natural satellites
      - Inner moons
        - Metis
        - Adrastea
        - Almathea
        - Thebe
      - Galilean moons
        - Io
        - Europa
        - Ganymede
        - Callisto
    - Jupiter trojans
    - Jupiter-crossing minor planets
  - Saturn
    - Rings of Saturn
      - Ring moonlets
    - Complete list of Saturn's natural satellites
      - Mimas
      - Enceladus
      - Tethys (trojans: Telesto and Calypso)
      - Dione (trojans: Helene and Polydeuces)
      - Rhea
        - Rings of Rhea (largely disproven)
      - Titan
      - Hyperion
      - Iapetus
      - Phoebe
      - Shepherd moons
    - Saturn trojan (2019 UO14)
    - Saturn-crossing minor planets
  - Uranus
    - Rings of Uranus
    - Complete list of Uranus's natural satellites
      - Miranda
      - Ariel
      - Umbriel
      - Titania
      - Oberon
    - Uranus trojan (2011 QF99)
    - Uranus-crossing minor planets
  - Neptune
    - Rings of Neptune
    - Complete list of Neptune's natural satellites
      - Proteus
      - Triton
      - Nereid
    - Neptune trojans
    - Neptune-crossing minor planets
  - Non-trojan minor planets
    - Centaurs
      - Chiron
      - Chariklo
      - Pholus
    - Damocloids
  - Trans-Neptunian objects (beyond the orbit of Neptune)
    - Kuiper-belt objects (KBOs)
      - Plutinos
        - Orcus, a dwarf planet
          - Vanth
        - Pluto, a dwarf planet
          - Complete list of Pluto's natural satellites
            - Charon
            - Styx
            - Nix
            - Kerberos
            - Hydra
        - Ixion
        - Achlys
        - Lempo
        - Huya
        - Arawn
      - Twotinos
      - Cubewanos (classical objects)
        - Haumea, a dwarf planet
          - Namaka
          - Hiʻiaka
        - 2026 ED138
        - Quaoar, a dwarf planet
          - Weywot
        - Makemake, a dwarf planet
          - S/2015 (136472) 1
        - Xewioso
        - Máni
        - Salacia
          - Actaea
        - Aya
        - Varda
          - Ilmarë
        - Varuna
        - Goibniu
        - Ritona
        - Chaos
        - Logos
        - Deucalion
        - Teharonhiawako
        - Borasisi
        - Uni
        - Arrokoth
        - Albion
    - Scattered-disc objects
      - Gonggong, a dwarf planet
        - Xiangliu
      - Eris, a dwarf planet
        - Dysnomia
      - Chiminigagua
      - Gǃkúnǁʼhòmdímà
        - Gǃòʼé ǃHú
      - (574372) 2010 JO179
      - (303775) 2005 QU182
      - (84522) 2002 TC302
      - (612584) 2003 QX113
      - (87269) 2000 OO67
      - 2015 TH367
      - Rumina
      - 2014 UZ224
    - Detached objects
      - (612911) 2004 XR190
      - 2017 OF201
      - 2012 VP113 (possibly inner Oort cloud)
      - Sedna, a dwarf planet (possibly inner Oort cloud)
    - Oort cloud (hypothetical)
      - Hills cloud/inner Oort cloud
      - Outer Oort cloud

The Solar System also contains:

- Comets
  - List of periodic comets
    - Halley's Comet
    - Comet Encke
  - List of long-period comets
    - Comet Hale-Bopp
    - Comet Hyakutake
  - List of near-parabolic comets
- Small objects, including:
  - Meteoroids
  - Interplanetary dust
  - Helium focusing cone, around the Sun
  - Human-made objects orbiting the Sun, Mercury, Venus, Earth, Mars, Jupiter, and Saturn, including active artificial satellites and space junk
- Heliosphere, a bubble in space produced by the solar wind
  - Heliosheath
    - Heliopause
    - Hydrogen wall, a pile up of hydrogen from the interstellar medium

== See also ==
- Outline of the Solar System
- Lists of astronomical objects
- List of natural satellites
- List of Solar System objects by size
- List of Solar System objects most distant from the Sun
- Ring system
- Solar System models
