= List of minor planets: 612001–613000 =

The following is a partial list of minor planets, running from minor-planet number 612001 through 613000, inclusive. The primary data for this and other partial lists is based on JPL's "Small-Body Orbital Elements" and data available from the Minor Planet Center. Critical list information is also provided by the MPC, unless otherwise specified from Lowell Observatory. A detailed description of the table's columns and additional sources are given on the main page including a complete list of every page in this series, and a statistical break-up on the dynamical classification of minor planets.

Also see the summary list of all named bodies in numerical and alphabetical order, and the corresponding naming citations for the number range of this particular list. New namings may only be added to this list after official publication, as the preannouncement of names is condemned by the Working Group for Small Bodies Nomenclature of the International Astronomical Union.

Near-Earth obj.	MBA (inner)	MBA (outer)	Centaur
Mars-crosser	MBA (middle)	Jupiter trojan	Trans-Neptunian obj.
Unclassified

== 612001–612100 ==
Designation			Discovery			Properties		Ref
Permanent	Provisional	Named after	Date	Site	Discoverer(s)	Category	Diam.	Ref
612001	2007 MS_{17}	—	June 21, 2007	Mount Lemmon	Mount Lemmon Survey	·	3.0 km	MPC · JPL
612002	2007 MX_{22}	—	June 22, 2007	Kitt Peak	Spacewatch	·	1.3 km	MPC · JPL
612003	2007 MC_{23}	—	December 19, 2004	Mount Lemmon	Mount Lemmon Survey	·	3.0 km	MPC · JPL
612004	2007 MR_{24}	—	June 23, 2007	Kitt Peak	Spacewatch	·	1.5 km	MPC · JPL
612005	2007 MS_{26}	—	May 10, 2007	Mount Lemmon	Mount Lemmon Survey	·	3.7 km	MPC · JPL
612006	2007 MG_{27}	—	April 7, 2006	Mount Lemmon	Mount Lemmon Survey	·	3.0 km	MPC · JPL
612007	2007 MW_{27}	—	September 23, 2008	Mount Lemmon	Mount Lemmon Survey	·	3.0 km	MPC · JPL
612008	2007 MZ_{27}	—	June 23, 2007	Siding Spring	SSS	·	1.4 km	MPC · JPL
612009	2007 MT_{28}	—	May 17, 2012	Mount Lemmon	Mount Lemmon Survey	·	2.3 km	MPC · JPL
612010	2007 MY_{28}	—	February 3, 2017	Mount Lemmon	Mount Lemmon Survey	·	2.5 km	MPC · JPL
612011	2007 MF_{30}	—	November 22, 2014	Haleakala	Pan-STARRS 1	·	2.8 km	MPC · JPL
612012	1983 LC	—	June 13, 1983	Palomar Mountain	E. F. Helin, R. S. Dunbar	T_{j} (2.99) · APO · PHA	450 m	MPC · JPL
612013	1991 TF_{3}	—	October 2, 1991	Palomar Mountain	C. S. Shoemaker	APO	490 m	MPC · JPL
612014	1991 VO_{8}	—	November 4, 1991	Kitt Peak	Spacewatch	·	1.9 km	MPC · JPL
612015	1992 DD_{1}	—	February 23, 1992	Kitt Peak	Spacewatch	·	810 m	MPC · JPL
612016	1992 YB_{3}	—	December 24, 1992	Kitt Peak	Spacewatch	·	520 m	MPC · JPL
612017	1993 TL_{6}	—	October 9, 1993	Kitt Peak	Spacewatch	·	960 m	MPC · JPL
612018	1993 WG	—	November 21, 1993	Kitt Peak	Spacewatch	·	1.0 km	MPC · JPL
612019	1994 EV_{3}	—	March 13, 1994	Mauna Kea	D. C. Jewitt, J. X. Luu	cubewano (cold)	134 km	MPC · JPL
612020	1994 RL_{11}	—	September 12, 1994	Kitt Peak	Spacewatch	·	440 m	MPC · JPL
612021	1994 SG_{11}	—	September 29, 1994	Kitt Peak	Spacewatch	·	1.6 km	MPC · JPL
612022	1994 UK_{10}	—	October 29, 1994	Kitt Peak	Spacewatch	·	540 m	MPC · JPL
612023	1994 VX_{3}	—	November 5, 1994	Kitt Peak	Spacewatch	KON	2.1 km	MPC · JPL
612024	1994 WA_{13}	—	November 26, 1994	Kitt Peak	Spacewatch	·	1.0 km	MPC · JPL
612025	1995 CD_{10}	—	February 4, 1995	Kitt Peak	Spacewatch	·	520 m	MPC · JPL
612026	1995 DC_{2}	—	February 24, 1995	Mauna Kea	J. X. Luu, D. C. Jewitt	cubewano (cold)	123 km	MPC · JPL
612027	1995 FJ	—	March 29, 1995	La Silla	Mottola, S.	APO	260 m	MPC · JPL
612028	1995 FX_{10}	—	March 27, 1995	Kitt Peak	Spacewatch	·	2.2 km	MPC · JPL
612029	1995 HM_{5}	—	April 26, 1995	Cerro Tololo	J. X. Luu	plutino	130 km	MPC · JPL
612030	1995 SG_{6}	—	September 17, 1995	Kitt Peak	Spacewatch	·	560 m	MPC · JPL
612031	1995 SR_{14}	—	September 18, 1995	Kitt Peak	Spacewatch	DOR	1.4 km	MPC · JPL
612032	1995 SC_{48}	—	September 26, 1995	Kitt Peak	Spacewatch	3:2 · SHU	3.8 km	MPC · JPL
612033	1995 SL_{51}	—	September 26, 1995	Kitt Peak	Spacewatch	MAS	430 m	MPC · JPL
612034	1995 SN_{63}	—	September 25, 1995	Kitt Peak	Spacewatch	·	710 m	MPC · JPL
612035	1995 SX_{67}	—	September 18, 1995	Kitt Peak	Spacewatch	·	990 m	MPC · JPL
612036	1995 SO_{72}	—	September 21, 1995	Kitt Peak	Spacewatch	·	840 m	MPC · JPL
612037	1995 SW_{74}	—	September 19, 1995	Kitt Peak	Spacewatch	·	1.7 km	MPC · JPL
612038	1995 SX_{86}	—	September 27, 1995	Kitt Peak	Spacewatch	PHO	540 m	MPC · JPL
612039	1995 TN_{3}	—	October 15, 1995	Kitt Peak	Spacewatch	·	780 m	MPC · JPL
612040	1995 UG_{51}	—	October 20, 1995	Kitt Peak	Spacewatch	(1547)	1.0 km	MPC · JPL
612041	1995 UC_{72}	—	October 20, 1995	Kitt Peak	Spacewatch	·	1 km	MPC · JPL
612042	1996 GT_{4}	—	April 11, 1996	Kitt Peak	Spacewatch	·	510 m	MPC · JPL
612043	1996 RS_{7}	—	September 5, 1996	Kitt Peak	Spacewatch	(5)	850 m	MPC · JPL
612044	1996 RG_{16}	—	September 13, 1996	Kitt Peak	Spacewatch	·	1.1 km	MPC · JPL
612045	1996 RR_{20}	—	September 15, 1996	La Palma	La Palma	plutino	207 km	MPC · JPL
612046	1996 TN_{5}	—	October 9, 1996	Haleakala-NEAT/GEO	NEAT	·	1.6 km	MPC · JPL
612047	1996 TK_{66}	—	October 9, 1996	Cerro Tololo	Schmidt, B., the High-Z team	cubewano (cold)	181 km	MPC · JPL
612048	1996 TS_{66}	—	October 12, 1996	Mauna Kea	D. C. Jewitt, J. X. Luu, C. A. Trujillo	cubewano (hot)	159 km	MPC · JPL
612049	1997 CT_{29}	—	February 2, 1997	Mauna Kea	D. C. Jewitt, J. X. Luu, C. A. Trujillo	cubewano (cold)	162 km	MPC · JPL
612050	1997 GL_{3}	—	April 7, 1997	Socorro	LINEAR	APO · PHA	530 m	MPC · JPL
612051	1997 SZ_{10}	—	September 24, 1997	Mauna Kea	D. C. Jewitt	twotino	70 km	MPC · JPL
612052	1997 SH_{12}	—	September 27, 1997	Kitt Peak	Spacewatch	·	1.1 km	MPC · JPL
612053	1997 SA_{33}	—	September 29, 1997	Kitt Peak	Spacewatch	·	1.0 km	MPC · JPL
612054	1997 TH	—	October 1, 1997	Mauna Kea	Veillet, C., Shank, R.	·	2.1 km	MPC · JPL
612055	1997 UH_{3}	—	October 24, 1997	Peking	SCAP	·	1.2 km	MPC · JPL
612056	1998 EX_{3}	—	March 2, 1998	Kitt Peak	Spacewatch	H	400 m	MPC · JPL
612057	1998 FJ_{74}	—	March 31, 1998	Socorro	LINEAR	AMO	570 m	MPC · JPL
612058	1998 HN_{3}	—	April 19, 1998	Kitt Peak	Spacewatch	T_{j} (2.87) · AMO	770 m	MPC · JPL
612059	1998 HO_{4}	—	April 21, 1998	Kleť	Kleť	·	1.3 km	MPC · JPL
612060	1998 HH_{151}	—	April 28, 1998	Mauna Kea	D. C. Jewitt, J. X. Luu, C. A. Trujillo, D. J. Tholen	plutino	104 km	MPC · JPL
612061	1998 MR_{24}	—	June 30, 1998	Socorro	LINEAR	AMO	490 m	MPC · JPL
612062	1998 OS_{4}	—	July 26, 1998	Anderson Mesa	LONEOS	·	1.0 km	MPC · JPL
612063	1998 QD_{2}	—	August 19, 1998	Socorro	LINEAR	·	1.8 km	MPC · JPL
612064	1998 QQ_{52}	—	August 27, 1998	Socorro	LINEAR	AMO · critical	210 m	MPC · JPL
612065	1998 QP_{63}	—	August 31, 1998	Socorro	LINEAR	·	1.0 km	MPC · JPL
612066	1998 RR_{2}	—	September 14, 1998	Socorro	LINEAR	·	1.4 km	MPC · JPL
612067	1998 RC_{3}	—	September 13, 1998	Kitt Peak	Spacewatch	MAS	450 m	MPC · JPL
612068	1998 RE_{43}	—	September 14, 1998	Socorro	LINEAR	·	1.1 km	MPC · JPL
612069	1998 SQ_{7}	—	September 20, 1998	Kitt Peak	Spacewatch	·	910 m	MPC · JPL
612070	1998 ST_{12}	—	September 23, 1998	Catalina	CSS	·	2.4 km	MPC · JPL
612071	1998 ST_{18}	—	September 18, 1998	Kitt Peak	Spacewatch	·	1.8 km	MPC · JPL
612072	1998 SU_{36}	—	September 20, 1998	Kitt Peak	Spacewatch	critical	770 m	MPC · JPL
612073	1998 SB_{41}	—	September 25, 1998	Kitt Peak	Spacewatch	EOS	1.4 km	MPC · JPL
612074	1998 SH_{41}	—	September 25, 1998	Kitt Peak	Spacewatch	·	620 m	MPC · JPL
612075	1998 SV_{48}	—	September 27, 1998	Kitt Peak	Spacewatch	·	1.3 km	MPC · JPL
612076	1998 SE_{94}	—	September 26, 1998	Socorro	LINEAR	·	1.2 km	MPC · JPL
612077	1998 SE_{150}	—	September 26, 1998	Socorro	LINEAR	·	1.7 km	MPC · JPL
612078	1998 UQ_{1}	—	October 19, 1998	Socorro	LINEAR	T_{j} (2.2)	1.9 km	MPC · JPL
612079	1998 UR_{11}	—	October 17, 1998	Kitt Peak	Spacewatch	·	600 m	MPC · JPL
612080	1998 VH_{42}	—	November 15, 1998	Kitt Peak	Spacewatch	·	940 m	MPC · JPL
612081	1998 WG_{24}	—	November 18, 1998	Kitt Peak	M. W. Buie	cubewano (cold)	155 km	MPC · JPL
612082	1998 WY_{24}	—	November 18, 1998	Kitt Peak	M. W. Buie	cubewano (cold)	147 km	MPC · JPL
612083	1998 WX_{31}	—	November 18, 1998	Kitt Peak	M. W. Buie	cubewano (cold)	153 km	MPC · JPL
612084	1999 CF_{119}	—	February 11, 1999	Mauna Kea	D. C. Jewitt, C. A. Trujillo, J. X. Luu	SDO	142 km	MPC · JPL
612085	1999 CL_{119}	—	February 11, 1999	Mauna Kea	J. X. Luu, C. A. Trujillo, D. C. Jewitt	cubewano (hot)	282 km	MPC · JPL
612086	1999 CX_{131}	—	February 11, 1999	Mauna Kea	C. A. Trujillo, J. X. Luu, D. C. Jewitt	res · 3:5	142 km	MPC · JPL
612087	1999 CU_{153}	—	February 12, 1999	Mauna Kea	C. A. Trujillo, J. X. Luu, D. C. Jewitt	cubewano (cold)	123 km	MPC · JPL
612088	1999 CM_{158}	—	February 11, 1999	Mauna Kea	Mauna Kea	plutino · moon	133 km	MPC · JPL
612089	1999 FJ_{21}	—	March 22, 1999	Kitt Peak	Kitt Peak	APO · fast	320 m	MPC · JPL
612090	1999 FH_{76}	—	March 20, 1999	Apache Point	Apache Point	·	610 m	MPC · JPL
612091	1999 HV_{1}	—	April 18, 1999	Kitt Peak	Kitt Peak	AMO +1km	1.1 km	MPC · JPL
612092	1999 HV_{11}	—	April 18, 1999	Kitt Peak	Kitt Peak	cubewano (cold)	102 km	MPC · JPL
612093	1999 LE_{31}	—	June 12, 1999	Socorro	Lincoln Lab ETS	damocloid · unusual	17 km	MPC · JPL
612094	1999 NW_{2}	—	July 13, 1999	Socorro	Lincoln Lab ETS	APO	80 m	MPC · JPL
612095	1999 OJ_{4}	—	July 18, 1999	Mauna Kea	Mauna Kea	other TNO · moon	75 km	MPC · JPL
612096	1999 RV_{29}	—	September 8, 1999	Socorro	Lincoln Lab ETS	·	2.1 km	MPC · JPL
612097	1999 RC_{31}	—	September 8, 1999	Socorro	Lincoln Lab ETS	·	1.5 km	MPC · JPL
612098	1999 RM_{45}	—	September 14, 1999	Socorro	Lincoln Lab ETS	APO · PHA · moon	390 m	MPC · JPL
612099	1999 RA_{176}	—	September 14, 1999	Kitt Peak	Kitt Peak	·	780 m	MPC · JPL
612100	1999 RC_{215}	—	September 6, 1999	Mauna Kea	Mauna Kea	cubewano (cold)	144 km	MPC · JPL

== 612101–612200 ==
back to top

Designation			Discovery			Properties		Ref
Permanent	Provisional	Named after	Date	Site	Discoverer(s)	Category	Diam.	Ref
612101	1999 RJ_{215}	—	September 7, 1999	Mauna Kea	Mauna Kea	res · 4:11	125 km	MPC · JPL
612102	1999 RK_{215}	—	September 7, 1999	Mauna Kea	Mauna Kea	plutino	156 km	MPC · JPL
612103	1999 SK_{10}	—	September 30, 1999	Kitt Peak	Kitt Peak	APO	380 m	MPC · JPL
612104	1999 SL_{13}	—	September 16, 1999	Kitt Peak	Kitt Peak	·	1.5 km	MPC · JPL
612105	1999 TT_{46}	—	October 4, 1999	Kitt Peak	Kitt Peak	·	1.8 km	MPC · JPL
612106	1999 TO_{50}	—	October 4, 1999	Kitt Peak	Kitt Peak	·	1.4 km	MPC · JPL
612107	1999 TZ_{53}	—	October 6, 1999	Kitt Peak	Kitt Peak	·	710 m	MPC · JPL
612108	1999 TT_{56}	—	October 6, 1999	Kitt Peak	Kitt Peak	·	520 m	MPC · JPL
612109	1999 TH_{60}	—	October 7, 1999	Kitt Peak	Kitt Peak	·	420 m	MPC · JPL
612110	1999 TT_{60}	—	October 7, 1999	Kitt Peak	Kitt Peak	·	490 m	MPC · JPL
612111	1999 TA_{64}	—	October 8, 1999	Kitt Peak	Kitt Peak	·	950 m	MPC · JPL
612112	1999 TU_{82}	—	October 12, 1999	Kitt Peak	Kitt Peak	·	570 m	MPC · JPL
612113	1999 TN_{153}	—	October 7, 1999	Socorro	Lincoln Lab ETS	·	1.2 km	MPC · JPL
612114	1999 TG_{205}	—	October 13, 1999	Socorro	Lincoln Lab ETS	·	1.4 km	MPC · JPL
612115	1999 TX_{250}	—	October 9, 1999	Kitt Peak	Kitt Peak	·	1.1 km	MPC · JPL
612116	1999 TS_{312}	—	October 7, 1999	Kitt Peak	Kitt Peak	·	1.3 km	MPC · JPL
612117	1999 TO_{336}	—	October 11, 1999	Kitt Peak	Kitt Peak	·	400 m	MPC · JPL
612118	1999 UK_{5}	—	October 29, 1999	Socorro	Lincoln Lab ETS	·	1.5 km	MPC · JPL
612119	1999 UZ_{32}	—	October 31, 1999	Kitt Peak	Kitt Peak	·	1.2 km	MPC · JPL
612120	1999 UM_{34}	—	October 31, 1999	Kitt Peak	Kitt Peak	·	450 m	MPC · JPL
612121	1999 VL_{3}	—	November 1, 1999	Kitt Peak	Kitt Peak	·	860 m	MPC · JPL
612122	1999 VR_{5}	—	November 4, 1999	Catalina	CSS	·	450 m	MPC · JPL
612123	1999 VX_{18}	—	November 2, 1999	Kitt Peak	Kitt Peak	·	1.0 km	MPC · JPL
612124	1999 VA_{40}	—	November 11, 1999	Kitt Peak	Kitt Peak	MAS	900 m	MPC · JPL
612125	1999 VO_{42}	—	November 4, 1999	Kitt Peak	Kitt Peak	·	1.0 km	MPC · JPL
612126	1999 VZ_{72}	—	November 12, 1999	Socorro	Lincoln Lab ETS	·	1.7 km	MPC · JPL
612127	1999 VL_{76}	—	November 5, 1999	Kitt Peak	Kitt Peak	·	2.2 km	MPC · JPL
612128	1999 VF_{87}	—	November 1, 1999	Catalina	CSS	·	1.0 km	MPC · JPL
612129	1999 VS_{91}	—	November 7, 1999	Socorro	Lincoln Lab ETS	·	1.1 km	MPC · JPL
612130	1999 VU_{99}	—	November 9, 1999	Socorro	Lincoln Lab ETS	·	2.8 km	MPC · JPL
612131	1999 VU_{121}	—	November 4, 1999	Kitt Peak	Kitt Peak	·	2.1 km	MPC · JPL
612132	1999 VN_{123}	—	November 5, 1999	Kitt Peak	Kitt Peak	·	910 m	MPC · JPL
612133	1999 VM_{131}	—	November 9, 1999	Kitt Peak	Kitt Peak	·	1.2 km	MPC · JPL
612134	1999 VL_{147}	—	November 13, 1999	Socorro	Lincoln Lab ETS	(5)	1.2 km	MPC · JPL
612135	1999 VB_{215}	—	November 1, 1999	Kitt Peak	Kitt Peak	·	530 m	MPC · JPL
612136	1999 WR_{11}	—	November 28, 1999	Kitt Peak	Kitt Peak	·	1.2 km	MPC · JPL
612137	1999 WP_{18}	—	November 30, 1999	Kitt Peak	Kitt Peak	(5)	1.1 km	MPC · JPL
612138	1999 WG_{24}	—	November 28, 1999	Kitt Peak	Kitt Peak	·	520 m	MPC · JPL
612139	1999 XD_{106}	—	December 10, 1999	Socorro	Lincoln Lab ETS	T_{j} (2.85)	1.7 km	MPC · JPL
612140	1999 XK_{141}	—	December 13, 1999	Socorro	Lincoln Lab ETS	·	910 m	MPC · JPL
612141	1999 XY_{143}	—	December 14, 1999	Mount Hopkins	C. W. Hergenrother	cubewano (hot) · moon	273 km	MPC · JPL
612142	2000 AP_{209}	—	January 5, 2000	Kitt Peak	Spacewatch	·	3.7 km	MPC · JPL
612143	2000 BO_{28}	—	January 30, 2000	Kitt Peak	Spacewatch	APO · PHA	380 m	MPC · JPL
612144	2000 CP_{104}	—	February 6, 2000	Kitt Peak	M. W. Buie	cubewano (hot)	208 km	MPC · JPL
612145	2000 CQ_{104}	—	February 6, 2000	Kitt Peak	M. W. Buie	res · 3:4	80 km	MPC · JPL
612146	2000 CE_{105}	—	February 5, 2000	Kitt Peak	M. W. Buie	cubewano (cold)	120 km	MPC · JPL
612147	2000 CF_{105}	—	February 5, 2000	Kitt Peak	M. W. Buie	cubewano (cold) · moon	64 km	MPC · JPL
612148	2000 CG_{105}	—	February 5, 2000	Kitt Peak	M. W. Buie	cubewano (hot)	195 km	MPC · JPL
612149	2000 CJ_{105}	—	February 5, 2000	Kitt Peak	M. W. Buie	cubewano (hot)	288 km	MPC · JPL
612150	2000 CO_{105}	—	February 5, 2000	Kitt Peak	M. W. Buie	cubewano (hot)	324 km	MPC · JPL
612151	2000 CX_{110}	—	February 6, 2000	Kitt Peak	M. W. Buie	·	570 m	MPC · JPL
612152	2000 DV_{110}	—	February 28, 2000	Socorro	LINEAR	AMO	510 m	MPC · JPL
612153	2000 EV_{52}	—	March 3, 2000	Kitt Peak	Spacewatch	·	1.8 km	MPC · JPL
612154	2000 EV_{53}	—	March 9, 2000	Kitt Peak	Spacewatch	·	470 m	MPC · JPL
612155	2000 FJ_{6}	—	March 25, 2000	Kitt Peak	Spacewatch	·	490 m	MPC · JPL
612156	2000 FF_{8}	—	March 29, 2000	Mauna Kea	Mauna Kea	cubewano (cold)	100 km	MPC · JPL
612157	2000 FG_{8}	—	March 29, 2000	Mauna Kea	Mauna Kea	cubewano (cold)	102 km	MPC · JPL
612158	2000 FV_{53}	—	March 31, 2000	Mauna Kea	D. Jewitt, C. A. Trujillo, S. S. Sheppard	plutino	120 km	MPC · JPL
612159	2000 HQ_{3}	—	April 25, 2000	Anderson Mesa	LONEOS	·	520 m	MPC · JPL
612160	2000 JD_{3}	—	May 2, 2000	Socorro	LINEAR	·	1.7 km	MPC · JPL
612161	2000 KK_{4}	—	May 26, 2000	Kitt Peak	Kitt Peak	cubewano (hot)	266 km	MPC · JPL
612162	2000 LK	—	June 1, 2000	Anderson Mesa	LONEOS	T_{j} (2.79) · APO +1km	780 m	MPC · JPL
612163 Thelowes	2000 LG_{10}	Thelowes	June 3, 2000	Mauna Kea	Stetson, P. B., D. D. Balam	·	910 m	MPC · JPL
612164	2000 LP_{26}	—	June 7, 2000	Kitt Peak	Spacewatch	·	1.1 km	MPC · JPL
612165	2000 OA_{22}	—	July 29, 2000	Anderson Mesa	LONEOS	·	990 m	MPC · JPL
612166	2000 ON_{67}	—	July 31, 2000	Cerro Tololo	M. W. Buie, Kern, S. D.	cubewano (cold)	149 km	MPC · JPL
612167	2000 OU_{69}	—	July 29, 2000	Cerro Tololo	M. W. Buie	cubewano (cold)	149 km	MPC · JPL
612168	2000 PF_{3}	—	August 1, 2000	Socorro	LINEAR	·	830 m	MPC · JPL
612169	2000 PS_{3}	—	August 3, 2000	Socorro	LINEAR	·	1.5 km	MPC · JPL
612170	2000 PZ_{5}	—	August 2, 2000	Socorro	LINEAR	·	1.3 km	MPC · JPL
612171	2000 QT_{7}	—	August 24, 2000	Socorro	LINEAR	AMO	310 m	MPC · JPL
612172	2000 QA_{115}	—	August 24, 2000	Socorro	LINEAR	·	630 m	MPC · JPL
612173	2000 QR_{210}	—	August 31, 2000	Socorro	LINEAR	·	1.3 km	MPC · JPL
612174	2000 QC_{226}	—	August 29, 2000	La Silla	Hainaut, O. R., Delahodde, C. E.	cubewano (cold)	145 km	MPC · JPL
612175	2000 QE_{226}	—	August 29, 2000	La Silla	Hainaut, O. R., Delahodde, C. E.	cubewano (cold)	176 km	MPC · JPL
612176	2000 QL_{251}	—	August 25, 2000	Cerro Tololo	M. W. Buie, S. D. Kern	twotino · moon	148 km	MPC · JPL
612177	2000 RQ_{80}	—	September 1, 2000	Socorro	LINEAR	·	1.1 km	MPC · JPL
612178	2000 RH_{96}	—	September 4, 2000	Haleakala	NEAT	·	1.2 km	MPC · JPL
612179	2000 SR_{8}	—	September 22, 2000	Prescott	P. G. Comba	·	1.1 km	MPC · JPL
612180	2000 SJ_{15}	—	September 23, 2000	Socorro	LINEAR	(5)	930 m	MPC · JPL
612181	2000 SO_{83}	—	September 24, 2000	Socorro	LINEAR	·	590 m	MPC · JPL
612182	2000 SQ_{163}	—	September 24, 2000	Socorro	LINEAR	·	1.2 km	MPC · JPL
612183	2000 SP_{183}	—	September 20, 2000	Haleakala	NEAT	·	2.2 km	MPC · JPL
612184	2000 SX_{206}	—	September 24, 2000	Socorro	LINEAR	·	1.1 km	MPC · JPL
612185	2000 SO_{296}	—	September 28, 2000	Socorro	LINEAR	·	1.5 km	MPC · JPL
612186	2000 SO_{303}	—	September 28, 2000	Socorro	LINEAR	·	750 m	MPC · JPL
612187	2000 SZ_{308}	—	September 30, 2000	Socorro	LINEAR	·	800 m	MPC · JPL
612188	2000 SV_{366}	—	September 23, 2000	Anderson Mesa	LONEOS	(5)	1 km	MPC · JPL
612189	2000 TU	—	October 1, 2000	Socorro	LINEAR	PHO	610 m	MPC · JPL
612190	2000 TW_{7}	—	October 1, 2000	Socorro	LINEAR	·	630 m	MPC · JPL
612191	2000 TM_{15}	—	October 1, 2000	Socorro	LINEAR	·	1.6 km	MPC · JPL
612192	2000 TA_{33}	—	October 4, 2000	Socorro	LINEAR	·	1.2 km	MPC · JPL
612193	2000 TE_{43}	—	October 1, 2000	Socorro	LINEAR	·	920 m	MPC · JPL
612194	2000 UV_{50}	—	October 24, 2000	Socorro	LINEAR	(5)	1.3 km	MPC · JPL
612195	2000 UZ_{111}	—	October 29, 2000	Kitt Peak	Spacewatch	·	1.1 km	MPC · JPL
612196	2000 VF_{19}	—	November 1, 2000	Socorro	LINEAR	·	780 m	MPC · JPL
612197	2000 WP_{19}	—	November 21, 2000	Socorro	LINEAR	ATE	90 m	MPC · JPL
612198	2000 WX_{37}	—	November 20, 2000	Socorro	LINEAR	·	580 m	MPC · JPL
612199	2000 WL_{63}	—	November 26, 2000	Socorro	LINEAR	AMO · APO	370 m	MPC · JPL
612200	2000 WM_{131}	—	November 20, 2000	Kitt Peak	Spacewatch	·	940 m	MPC · JPL

== 612201–612300 ==
back to top

Designation			Discovery			Properties		Ref
Permanent	Provisional	Named after	Date	Site	Discoverer(s)	Category	Diam.	Ref
612201	2000 WC_{132}	—	November 17, 2000	Kitt Peak	Spacewatch	·	890 m	MPC · JPL
612202	2000 WO_{148}	—	November 29, 2000	Anderson Mesa	LONEOS	AMO	280 m	MPC · JPL
612203	2000 WT_{169}	—	November 23, 2000	Mauna Kea	D. C. Jewitt, S. S. Sheppard, Y. R. Fernandez	cubewano (cold) · moon	202 km	MPC · JPL
612204	2000 WB_{187}	—	November 26, 2000	Mauna Kea	S. S. Sheppard, D. C. Jewitt	3:2	2.9 km	MPC · JPL
612205	2000 WD_{194}	—	November 24, 2000	Kitt Peak	Deep Lens Survey	·	1.1 km	MPC · JPL
612206	2000 XM_{15}	—	December 5, 2000	Bohyunsan	Jeon, Y.-B., Lee, B.-C.	·	1.6 km	MPC · JPL
612207	2000 XL_{47}	—	December 15, 2000	Socorro	LINEAR	·	1.4 km	MPC · JPL
612208	2000 YH_{2}	—	December 17, 2000	Kitt Peak	Kitt Peak	plutino	148 km	MPC · JPL
612209	2000 YM_{141}	—	December 20, 2000	Kitt Peak	Deep Lens Survey	·	1.8 km	MPC · JPL
612210	2001 BP_{61}	—	January 26, 2001	Socorro	LINEAR	AMO · APO	290 m	MPC · JPL
612211	2001 DX_{79}	—	February 20, 2001	Haleakala	NEAT	·	860 m	MPC · JPL
612212	2001 FC_{50}	—	March 18, 2001	Socorro	LINEAR	·	1.8 km	MPC · JPL
612213	2001 FK_{185}	—	March 25, 2001	Kitt Peak	M. W. Buie	cubewano (cold)	100 km	MPC · JPL
612214	2001 FK_{193}	—	March 25, 2001	Kitt Peak	M. W. Buie	cubewano (cold)	148 km	MPC · JPL
612215	2001 FC_{208}	—	March 21, 2001	Kitt Peak	SKADS	MAS	550 m	MPC · JPL
612216	2001 FY_{225}	—	March 22, 2001	Kitt Peak	SKADS	·	890 m	MPC · JPL
612217	2001 HZ_{58}	—	April 26, 2001	La Silla	Hainaut, O. R., A. C. Delsanti	cubewano (cold)	169 km	MPC · JPL
612218	2001 KD_{77}	—	May 24, 2001	Cerro Tololo	M. W. Buie	plutino	232 km	MPC · JPL
612219	2001 MM_{8}	—	June 20, 2001	Siding Spring	R. H. McNaught	·	1.1 km	MPC · JPL
612220	2001 OA_{10}	—	July 19, 2001	Palomar	NEAT	·	1.8 km	MPC · JPL
612221	2001 PA_{17}	—	August 9, 2001	Palomar	NEAT	·	1.1 km	MPC · JPL
612222	2001 PJ_{60}	—	August 13, 2001	Haleakala	NEAT	·	1.5 km	MPC · JPL
612223	2001 QF_{6}	—	August 16, 2001	Socorro	LINEAR	T_{j} (2.28) · unusual	5.4 km	MPC · JPL
612224	2001 QJ_{6}	—	August 16, 2001	Socorro	LINEAR	·	1.0 km	MPC · JPL
612225	2001 QA_{32}	—	August 17, 2001	Socorro	LINEAR	·	540 m	MPC · JPL
612226	2001 QZ_{33}	—	August 16, 2001	Socorro	LINEAR	·	1.2 km	MPC · JPL
612227	2001 QC_{34}	—	August 17, 2001	Palomar	NEAT	APO · PHA	330 m	MPC · JPL
612228	2001 QL_{72}	—	August 21, 2001	Kitt Peak	Spacewatch	MAS	550 m	MPC · JPL
612229	2001 QD_{107}	—	August 23, 2001	Socorro	LINEAR	H	680 m	MPC · JPL
612230	2001 QP_{110}	—	August 20, 2001	Ondřejov	P. Kušnirák, P. Pravec	·	2.0 km	MPC · JPL
612231	2001 QZ_{114}	—	August 17, 2001	Socorro	LINEAR	·	1.6 km	MPC · JPL
612232	2001 QS_{121}	—	August 19, 2001	Socorro	LINEAR	·	2.6 km	MPC · JPL
612233	2001 QS_{129}	—	August 20, 2001	Socorro	LINEAR	·	2.9 km	MPC · JPL
612234	2001 QN_{187}	—	August 21, 2001	Haleakala	NEAT	·	1.8 km	MPC · JPL
612235	2001 QV_{264}	—	August 26, 2001	Haleakala	NEAT	·	900 m	MPC · JPL
612236	2001 QO_{297}	—	August 19, 2001	Cerro Tololo	M. W. Buie	cubewano (cold)	162 km	MPC · JPL
612237	2001 QP_{297}	—	August 19, 2001	Cerro Tololo	M. W. Buie	cubewano (cold)	144 km	MPC · JPL
612238	2001 QR_{297}	—	August 20, 2001	Cerro Tololo	M. W. Buie	cubewano (hot)	213 km	MPC · JPL
612239	2001 QC_{298}	—	August 21, 2001	Cerro Tololo	M. W. Buie	cubewano (hot) · moon	235 km	MPC · JPL
612240	2001 QE_{298}	—	August 19, 2001	Cerro Tololo	M. W. Buie	res · 4:7	110 km	MPC · JPL
612241	2001 QH_{298}	—	August 19, 2001	Cerro Tololo	M. W. Buie	plutino	118 km	MPC · JPL
612242	2001 QQ_{322}	—	August 21, 2001	Cerro Tololo	M. W. Buie	cubewano (cold) · moon	167 km	MPC · JPL
612243	2001 QR_{322}	—	August 21, 2001	Cerro Tololo	M. W. Buie	NT	178 km	MPC · JPL
612244	2001 QS_{322}	—	August 19, 2001	Cerro Tololo	M. W. Buie	cubewano (cold)	186 km	MPC · JPL
612245	2001 QX_{322}	—	August 19, 2001	La Palma	La Palma	SDO	190 km	MPC · JPL
612246	2001 RM_{9}	—	September 9, 2001	Socorro	LINEAR	PHO	960 m	MPC · JPL
612247	2001 RB_{55}	—	September 12, 2001	Socorro	LINEAR	·	1.2 km	MPC · JPL
612248	2001 RZ_{59}	—	September 12, 2001	Socorro	LINEAR	·	1.1 km	MPC · JPL
612249	2001 RB_{117}	—	September 12, 2001	Socorro	LINEAR	·	880 m	MPC · JPL
612250	2001 RJ_{117}	—	September 12, 2001	Socorro	LINEAR	·	770 m	MPC · JPL
612251	2001 RT_{121}	—	September 12, 2001	Socorro	LINEAR	NYS	900 m	MPC · JPL
612252	2001 RJ_{130}	—	September 12, 2001	Socorro	LINEAR	·	1.0 km	MPC · JPL
612253	2001 RS_{131}	—	September 12, 2001	Socorro	LINEAR	·	2.1 km	MPC · JPL
612254	2001 SN_{17}	—	September 16, 2001	Socorro	LINEAR	·	1.4 km	MPC · JPL
612255	2001 SV_{38}	—	September 16, 2001	Socorro	LINEAR	·	2.6 km	MPC · JPL
612256	2001 SS_{97}	—	September 20, 2001	Socorro	LINEAR	NYS	730 m	MPC · JPL
612257	2001 SO_{99}	—	September 20, 2001	Socorro	LINEAR	·	960 m	MPC · JPL
612258	2001 SA_{128}	—	September 16, 2001	Socorro	LINEAR	·	920 m	MPC · JPL
612259	2001 ST_{139}	—	September 16, 2001	Socorro	LINEAR	·	830 m	MPC · JPL
612260	2001 SD_{146}	—	September 16, 2001	Socorro	LINEAR	PHO	1.8 km	MPC · JPL
612261	2001 SJ_{154}	—	September 17, 2001	Socorro	LINEAR	·	1.6 km	MPC · JPL
612262	2001 SV_{168}	—	September 19, 2001	Socorro	LINEAR	·	910 m	MPC · JPL
612263	2001 SX_{193}	—	September 19, 2001	Socorro	LINEAR	·	850 m	MPC · JPL
612264	2001 SY_{216}	—	September 19, 2001	Socorro	LINEAR	MAS	610 m	MPC · JPL
612265	2001 SX_{225}	—	September 19, 2001	Socorro	LINEAR	·	800 m	MPC · JPL
612266	2001 SE_{269}	—	September 19, 2001	Kitt Peak	Spacewatch	·	590 m	MPC · JPL
612267	2001 SG_{286}	—	September 27, 2001	Socorro	LINEAR	APO · PHA	230 m	MPC · JPL
612268	2001 SP_{297}	—	September 20, 2001	Socorro	LINEAR	·	750 m	MPC · JPL
612269	2001 SB_{298}	—	September 20, 2001	Socorro	LINEAR	·	850 m	MPC · JPL
612270	2001 SL_{303}	—	September 20, 2001	Socorro	LINEAR	·	940 m	MPC · JPL
612271	2001 SW_{309}	—	September 23, 2001	Socorro	LINEAR	·	890 m	MPC · JPL
612272	2001 SA_{324}	—	September 26, 2001	Socorro	LINEAR	·	930 m	MPC · JPL
612273	2001 SY_{349}	—	September 19, 2001	Socorro	LINEAR	·	680 m	MPC · JPL
612274	2001 SX_{354}	—	September 26, 2001	Palomar	NEAT	·	1.2 km	MPC · JPL
612275	2001 TS_{1}	—	October 10, 2001	Palomar	NEAT	·	1.4 km	MPC · JPL
612276	2001 TK_{71}	—	October 13, 2001	Socorro	LINEAR	·	1.2 km	MPC · JPL
612277	2001 TZ_{103}	—	October 15, 2001	Desert Eagle	W. K. Y. Yeung	·	1.4 km	MPC · JPL
612278	2001 TP_{162}	—	October 11, 2001	Palomar	NEAT	·	690 m	MPC · JPL
612279	2001 TW_{175}	—	October 14, 2001	Socorro	LINEAR	PHO	640 m	MPC · JPL
612280	2001 TU_{183}	—	October 14, 2001	Socorro	LINEAR	MAS	610 m	MPC · JPL
612281	2001 TW_{186}	—	October 14, 2001	Socorro	LINEAR	·	1.6 km	MPC · JPL
612282	2001 TN_{193}	—	October 15, 2001	Socorro	LINEAR	·	770 m	MPC · JPL
612283	2001 TU_{231}	—	October 15, 2001	Kitt Peak	Spacewatch	(5)	910 m	MPC · JPL
612284	2001 TV_{232}	—	October 15, 2001	Palomar	NEAT	·	600 m	MPC · JPL
612285	2001 TH_{245}	—	October 14, 2001	Apache Point	SDSS	·	1 km	MPC · JPL
612286	2001 TF_{247}	—	October 14, 2001	Apache Point	SDSS	RAF	810 m	MPC · JPL
612287	2001 TW_{251}	—	October 14, 2001	Apache Point	SDSS	(5)	960 m	MPC · JPL
612288	2001 TA_{253}	—	October 14, 2001	Apache Point	SDSS	·	2.3 km	MPC · JPL
612289	2001 TC_{260}	—	October 14, 2001	Apache Point	SDSS	·	1.6 km	MPC · JPL
612290	2001 UC_{18}	—	October 25, 2001	Socorro	LINEAR	·	720 m	MPC · JPL
612291	2001 UW_{55}	—	October 17, 2001	Socorro	LINEAR	AEO	1.1 km	MPC · JPL
612292	2001 US_{56}	—	October 17, 2001	Socorro	LINEAR	NYS	1.0 km	MPC · JPL
612293	2001 UN_{68}	—	October 20, 2001	Socorro	LINEAR	·	2.6 km	MPC · JPL
612294	2001 UO_{70}	—	October 17, 2001	Kitt Peak	Spacewatch	·	1.5 km	MPC · JPL
612295	2001 UT_{71}	—	October 20, 2001	Kitt Peak	Spacewatch	·	1.1 km	MPC · JPL
612296	2001 UG_{88}	—	October 21, 2001	Kitt Peak	Spacewatch	·	540 m	MPC · JPL
612297	2001 UC_{104}	—	October 20, 2001	Socorro	LINEAR	NYS	510 m	MPC · JPL
612298	2001 UE_{129}	—	October 20, 2001	Socorro	LINEAR	NYS	860 m	MPC · JPL
612299	2001 UZ_{141}	—	October 23, 2001	Socorro	LINEAR	·	610 m	MPC · JPL
612300	2001 UQ_{190}	—	October 18, 2001	Palomar	NEAT	·	540 m	MPC · JPL

== 612301–612400 ==
back to top

Designation			Discovery			Properties		Ref
Permanent	Provisional	Named after	Date	Site	Discoverer(s)	Category	Diam.	Ref
612301	2001 UN_{194}	—	October 18, 2001	Palomar	NEAT	NYS	640 m	MPC · JPL
612302	2001 UA_{205}	—	October 19, 2001	Palomar	NEAT	·	510 m	MPC · JPL
612303	2001 UA_{227}	—	October 16, 2001	Palomar	NEAT	·	520 m	MPC · JPL
612304	2001 VL_{22}	—	November 9, 2001	Socorro	LINEAR	·	2.9 km	MPC · JPL
612305	2001 VQ_{64}	—	November 10, 2001	Socorro	LINEAR	·	2.3 km	MPC · JPL
612306	2001 VX_{77}	—	November 11, 2001	Kitt Peak	Spacewatch	·	640 m	MPC · JPL
612307	2001 VH_{124}	—	November 9, 2001	Socorro	LINEAR	·	1.6 km	MPC · JPL
612308	2001 VU_{124}	—	November 9, 2001	Socorro	LINEAR	·	1.8 km	MPC · JPL
612309	2001 VO_{127}	—	November 11, 2001	Apache Point	SDSS	T_{j} (2.97)	2.3 km	MPC · JPL
612310	2001 WC_{4}	—	November 17, 2001	Kitt Peak	Spacewatch	·	1.6 km	MPC · JPL
612311	2001 WU_{15}	—	November 22, 2001	Kitt Peak	Spacewatch	·	500 m	MPC · JPL
612312	2001 WF_{24}	—	November 17, 2001	Kitt Peak	Spacewatch	·	1.1 km	MPC · JPL
612313	2001 WO_{36}	—	November 17, 2001	Socorro	LINEAR	·	1.1 km	MPC · JPL
612314	2001 WC_{43}	—	November 18, 2001	Socorro	LINEAR	·	720 m	MPC · JPL
612315	2001 WE_{66}	—	November 20, 2001	Socorro	LINEAR	·	720 m	MPC · JPL
612316	2001 WQ_{66}	—	November 20, 2001	Socorro	LINEAR	·	800 m	MPC · JPL
612317	2001 WC_{71}	—	November 20, 2001	Socorro	LINEAR	·	830 m	MPC · JPL
612318	2001 XW_{31}	—	December 14, 2001	Socorro	LINEAR	·	1.9 km	MPC · JPL
612319	2001 XH_{49}	—	December 10, 2001	Socorro	LINEAR	PHO	890 m	MPC · JPL
612320	2001 XE_{104}	—	December 15, 2001	Socorro	LINEAR	T_{j} (2.9)	1.0 km	MPC · JPL
612321	2001 YF_{158}	—	December 18, 2001	Apache Point	SDSS	·	1.1 km	MPC · JPL
612322	2002 AJ_{92}	—	January 12, 2002	Cerro Tololo	Deep Lens Survey	EOS	1.3 km	MPC · JPL
612323	2002 AD_{110}	—	January 9, 2002	Socorro	LINEAR	·	2.2 km	MPC · JPL
612324	2002 AR_{129}	—	January 15, 2002	Kingsnake	J. V. McClusky	T_{j} (2.97) · AMO +1km	960 m	MPC · JPL
612325	2002 AT_{194}	—	January 13, 2002	Kitt Peak	Spacewatch	·	1.5 km	MPC · JPL
612326	2002 CD_{14}	—	February 7, 2002	Kitt Peak	Spacewatch	APO · PHA	290 m	MPC · JPL
612327	2002 CD_{26}	—	February 10, 2002	Socorro	LINEAR	·	530 m	MPC · JPL
612328	2002 CJ_{50}	—	February 12, 2002	Desert Eagle	W. K. Y. Yeung	·	1.5 km	MPC · JPL
612329	2002 CF_{77}	—	February 7, 2002	Socorro	LINEAR	·	1.6 km	MPC · JPL
612330	2002 CT_{85}	—	February 7, 2002	Socorro	LINEAR	NYS	1.0 km	MPC · JPL
612331	2002 CT_{133}	—	February 7, 2002	Socorro	LINEAR	PHO	940 m	MPC · JPL
612332	2002 CW_{224}	—	February 6, 2002	Kitt Peak	M. W. Buie	plutino	182 km	MPC · JPL
612333	2002 CZ_{224}	—	February 7, 2002	Kitt Peak	M. W. Buie	cubewano (cold)	141 km	MPC · JPL
612334	2002 CF_{293}	—	February 11, 2002	Socorro	LINEAR	·	730 m	MPC · JPL
612335	2002 CO_{316}	—	February 7, 2002	Palomar	NEAT	EOS	1.9 km	MPC · JPL
612336	2002 EN_{1}	—	March 6, 2002	Palomar	NEAT	·	1.5 km	MPC · JPL
612337	2002 EY_{2}	—	March 6, 2002	Kitt Peak	Spacewatch	APO · PHA	460 m	MPC · JPL
612338	2002 EN_{27}	—	March 9, 2002	Socorro	LINEAR	·	1.2 km	MPC · JPL
612339	2002 ET_{49}	—	March 12, 2002	Palomar	NEAT	·	1.7 km	MPC · JPL
612340	2002 EJ_{51}	—	March 12, 2002	Kitt Peak	Spacewatch	NYS	840 m	MPC · JPL
612341	2002 EO_{131}	—	March 13, 2002	Socorro	LINEAR	·	1.1 km	MPC · JPL
612342	2002 FC	—	March 16, 2002	Anderson Mesa	LONEOS	T_{j} (2.94) · APO · PHA	520 m	MPC · JPL
612343	2002 FT_{6}	—	March 23, 2002	Socorro	LINEAR	ATE	100 m	MPC · JPL
612344	2002 FJ_{8}	—	March 16, 2002	Socorro	LINEAR	·	1.2 km	MPC · JPL
612345	2002 GA_{3}	—	April 5, 2002	Palomar	NEAT	·	1.8 km	MPC · JPL
612346	2002 GQ_{5}	—	April 11, 2002	Palomar	NEAT	APO	230 m	MPC · JPL
612347	2002 GS_{8}	—	April 4, 2002	Palomar	NEAT	·	1.3 km	MPC · JPL
612348	2002 GZ_{8}	—	April 12, 2002	Socorro	LINEAR	T_{j} (2.97) · AMO · APO · PHA	640 m	MPC · JPL
612349	2002 GH_{32}	—	April 8, 2002	Cerro Tololo	M. W. Buie	cubewano (hot)	230 km	MPC · JPL
612350	2002 GP_{32}	—	April 6, 2002	Cerro Tololo	M. W. Buie	res · 2:5	181 km	MPC · JPL
612351	2002 GV_{32}	—	April 8, 2002	Cerro Tololo	M. W. Buie	plutino	163 km	MPC · JPL
612352	2002 GY_{32}	—	April 6, 2002	Cerro Tololo	M. W. Buie	plutino	161 km	MPC · JPL
612353	2002 GK_{110}	—	April 10, 2002	Socorro	LINEAR	·	750 m	MPC · JPL
612354	2002 GQ_{178}	—	April 8, 2002	Palomar	NEAT	·	930 m	MPC · JPL
612355	2002 GS_{186}	—	April 8, 2002	Palomar	NEAT	·	2.8 km	MPC · JPL
612356	2002 JX_{8}	—	May 4, 2002	Socorro	LINEAR	ATE · PHA	360 m	MPC · JPL
612357	2002 JC_{9}	—	May 6, 2002	Kitt Peak	Spacewatch	APO	680 m	MPC · JPL
612358	2002 JE_{9}	—	May 6, 2002	Socorro	LINEAR	APO · PHA	190 m	MPC · JPL
612359	2002 JG_{14}	—	May 8, 2002	Haleakala	NEAT	T_{j} (2.91)	2.3 km	MPC · JPL
612360	2002 JH_{37}	—	May 9, 2002	Socorro	LINEAR	·	530 m	MPC · JPL
612361	2002 JC_{100}	—	May 11, 2002	Socorro	LINEAR	T_{j} (2.91)	3.5 km	MPC · JPL
612362	2002 JQ_{100}	—	May 13, 2002	Socorro	LINEAR	APO	360 m	MPC · JPL
612363	2002 KK_{3}	—	May 18, 2002	Anderson Mesa	LONEOS	AMO	650 m	MPC · JPL
612364	2002 LE_{31}	—	June 10, 2002	Anderson Mesa	LONEOS	APO	330 m	MPC · JPL
612365	2002 LT_{62}	—	June 10, 2002	Palomar	NEAT	·	1.2 km	MPC · JPL
612366	2002 MO_{3}	—	June 28, 2002	Palomar	NEAT	T_{j} (2.78)	1.8 km	MPC · JPL
612367	2002 NU_{7}	—	July 9, 2002	Socorro	LINEAR	·	800 m	MPC · JPL
612368	2002 NX_{46}	—	July 12, 2002	Palomar	NEAT	T_{j} (2.97)	2.0 km	MPC · JPL
612369	2002 NU_{52}	—	July 14, 2002	Palomar	NEAT	·	520 m	MPC · JPL
612370	2002 NG_{58}	—	July 9, 2002	Palomar	NEAT	·	2.4 km	MPC · JPL
612371	2002 NK_{70}	—	July 9, 2002	Palomar	NEAT	·	1.0 km	MPC · JPL
612372	2002 NW_{70}	—	July 9, 2002	Palomar	NEAT	·	910 m	MPC · JPL
612373	2002 NZ_{71}	—	July 9, 2002	Palomar	NEAT	·	2.1 km	MPC · JPL
612374	2002 OW_{21}	—	July 29, 2002	Palomar	NEAT	H	450 m	MPC · JPL
612375	2002 OX_{25}	—	July 21, 2002	Palomar	NEAT	BAR	1.2 km	MPC · JPL
612376	2002 OW_{28}	—	July 29, 2002	Palomar	NEAT	THM	1.7 km	MPC · JPL
612377	2002 OP_{29}	—	July 17, 2002	Palomar	NEAT	T_{j} (2.94) · 3:2	4.9 km	MPC · JPL
612378	2002 PX_{5}	—	August 4, 2002	Palomar	NEAT	·	1.9 km	MPC · JPL
612379	2002 PC_{6}	—	August 2, 2002	Campo Imperatore	CINEOS	·	1.0 km	MPC · JPL
612380	2002 PF_{43}	—	August 10, 2002	Socorro	LINEAR	AMO · PHA	230 m	MPC · JPL
612381	2002 PP_{63}	—	August 12, 2002	Anderson Mesa	LONEOS	·	770 m	MPC · JPL
612382	2002 PW_{70}	—	August 11, 2002	Socorro	LINEAR	·	1.2 km	MPC · JPL
612383	2002 PO_{75}	—	August 12, 2002	Socorro	LINEAR	AMO	470 m	MPC · JPL
612384	2002 PO_{100}	—	August 14, 2002	Socorro	LINEAR	·	1.3 km	MPC · JPL
612385	2002 PC_{131}	—	August 6, 2002	Palomar	NEAT	·	690 m	MPC · JPL
612386	2002 PJ_{152}	—	August 10, 2002	Cerro Tololo	M. W. Buie	·	670 m	MPC · JPL
612387	2002 PM_{170}	—	August 7, 2002	Palomar	NEAT	·	510 m	MPC · JPL
612388	2002 PV_{170}	—	August 5, 2002	Mauna Kea	Mauna Kea	cubewano (cold)	188 km	MPC · JPL
612389	2002 PO_{185}	—	August 15, 2002	Palomar	NEAT	T_{j} (2.97) · EUP	3.0 km	MPC · JPL
612390	2002 PD_{186}	—	August 14, 2002	Palomar	NEAT	EUN	1.4 km	MPC · JPL
612391	2002 PS_{186}	—	August 11, 2002	Palomar	NEAT	·	580 m	MPC · JPL
612392	2002 PJ_{187}	—	August 11, 2002	Palomar	NEAT	·	1.0 km	MPC · JPL
612393	2002 PL_{187}	—	August 11, 2002	Palomar	NEAT	·	2.3 km	MPC · JPL
612394	2002 PB_{191}	—	August 15, 2002	Palomar	NEAT	DOR	2.2 km	MPC · JPL
612395	2002 QC	—	August 16, 2002	Haleakala	NEAT	·	870 m	MPC · JPL
612396	2002 QP_{10}	—	August 16, 2002	Palomar	NEAT	·	990 m	MPC · JPL
612397	2002 QS_{10}	—	August 17, 2002	Palomar	NEAT	PHO	770 m	MPC · JPL
612398	2002 QO_{11}	—	August 26, 2002	Palomar	NEAT	·	590 m	MPC · JPL
612399	2002 QD_{47}	—	August 30, 2002	Palomar	NEAT	·	510 m	MPC · JPL
612400	2002 QB_{49}	—	August 18, 2002	Palomar	S. F. Hönig	·	1.3 km	MPC · JPL

== 612401–612500 ==
back to top

Designation			Discovery			Properties		Ref
Permanent	Provisional	Named after	Date	Site	Discoverer(s)	Category	Diam.	Ref
612401	2002 QG_{50}	—	August 16, 2002	Palomar	Lowe, A.	(5)	1.0 km	MPC · JPL
612402	2002 QC_{51}	—	August 28, 2002	Palomar	R. Matson	·	720 m	MPC · JPL
612403	2002 QQ_{51}	—	August 29, 2002	Palomar	S. F. Hönig	MAS	510 m	MPC · JPL
612404	2002 QB_{55}	—	August 29, 2002	Palomar	S. F. Hönig	·	840 m	MPC · JPL
612405	2002 QC_{55}	—	August 29, 2002	Palomar	S. F. Hönig	·	980 m	MPC · JPL
612406	2002 QV_{59}	—	August 19, 2002	Palomar	NEAT	·	1.1 km	MPC · JPL
612407	2002 QR_{64}	—	August 18, 2002	Palomar	NEAT	·	1.2 km	MPC · JPL
612408	2002 QJ_{70}	—	August 18, 2002	Palomar	NEAT	MAS	540 m	MPC · JPL
612409	2002 QQ_{70}	—	August 28, 2002	Palomar	NEAT	·	1.0 km	MPC · JPL
612410	2002 QH_{72}	—	August 29, 2002	Palomar	NEAT	·	1.4 km	MPC · JPL
612411	2002 QU_{75}	—	August 17, 2002	Palomar	NEAT	MAS	500 m	MPC · JPL
612412	2002 QV_{76}	—	August 18, 2002	Palomar	NEAT	·	1.6 km	MPC · JPL
612413	2002 QR_{80}	—	August 19, 2002	Palomar	NEAT	·	2.7 km	MPC · JPL
612414	2002 QB_{85}	—	August 16, 2002	Palomar	NEAT	·	530 m	MPC · JPL
612415	2002 QK_{87}	—	August 29, 2002	Palomar	NEAT	3:2 · SHU	4.2 km	MPC · JPL
612416	2002 QP_{87}	—	August 27, 2002	Palomar	NEAT	THM	2.0 km	MPC · JPL
612417	2002 QQ_{88}	—	August 27, 2002	Palomar	NEAT	·	450 m	MPC · JPL
612418	2002 QC_{91}	—	August 30, 2002	Palomar	NEAT	·	790 m	MPC · JPL
612419	2002 QN_{94}	—	August 27, 2002	Palomar	NEAT	·	1.4 km	MPC · JPL
612420	2002 QO_{98}	—	August 18, 2002	Palomar	NEAT	·	1.8 km	MPC · JPL
612421	2002 QD_{99}	—	August 16, 2002	Palomar	NEAT	NYS	710 m	MPC · JPL
612422	2002 QE_{100}	—	August 18, 2002	Palomar	NEAT	·	800 m	MPC · JPL
612423	2002 QF_{105}	—	August 27, 2002	Palomar	NEAT	·	690 m	MPC · JPL
612424	2002 QQ_{105}	—	August 29, 2002	Palomar	NEAT	·	440 m	MPC · JPL
612425	2002 QA_{106}	—	August 19, 2002	Palomar	NEAT	·	600 m	MPC · JPL
612426	2002 QP_{106}	—	August 19, 2002	Palomar	NEAT	·	1.1 km	MPC · JPL
612427	2002 QQ_{107}	—	August 27, 2002	Palomar	NEAT	·	470 m	MPC · JPL
612428	2002 QU_{107}	—	August 27, 2002	Palomar	NEAT	·	500 m	MPC · JPL
612429	2002 QE_{112}	—	August 27, 2002	Palomar	NEAT	·	490 m	MPC · JPL
612430	2002 QC_{115}	—	August 29, 2002	Palomar	NEAT	·	830 m	MPC · JPL
612431	2002 QP_{115}	—	August 18, 2002	Palomar	NEAT	·	2.0 km	MPC · JPL
612432	2002 QF_{116}	—	August 19, 2002	Palomar	NEAT	·	2.0 km	MPC · JPL
612433	2002 QE_{123}	—	August 27, 2002	Palomar	NEAT	·	930 m	MPC · JPL
612434	2002 QS_{123}	—	August 29, 2002	Palomar	NEAT	·	800 m	MPC · JPL
612435	2002 QC_{124}	—	August 16, 2002	Palomar	NEAT	·	2.2 km	MPC · JPL
612436	2002 QH_{127}	—	August 30, 2002	Palomar	NEAT	NYS	890 m	MPC · JPL
612437	2002 QR_{127}	—	August 29, 2002	Palomar	NEAT	THM	2.1 km	MPC · JPL
612438	2002 QH_{128}	—	August 29, 2002	Palomar	NEAT	·	2.0 km	MPC · JPL
612439	2002 QG_{129}	—	August 18, 2002	Palomar	NEAT	THM	1.9 km	MPC · JPL
612440	2002 QU_{133}	—	August 28, 2002	Palomar	NEAT	·	1.0 km	MPC · JPL
612441	2002 QA_{138}	—	August 17, 2002	Palomar	NEAT	·	670 m	MPC · JPL
612442	2002 QH_{139}	—	August 26, 2002	Palomar	NEAT	·	1.1 km	MPC · JPL
612443	2002 RR_{25}	—	September 4, 2002	Anderson Mesa	LONEOS	ATE	220 m	MPC · JPL
612444	2002 RY_{65}	—	September 6, 2002	Kleť	Kleť	·	890 m	MPC · JPL
612445	2002 RD_{109}	—	September 6, 2002	Needville	J. Dellinger	·	620 m	MPC · JPL
612446	2002 RF_{112}	—	September 6, 2002	Socorro	LINEAR	·	690 m	MPC · JPL
612447	2002 RE_{125}	—	September 8, 2002	Campo Imperatore	CINEOS	·	990 m	MPC · JPL
612448	2002 RP_{148}	—	September 11, 2002	Palomar	NEAT	·	540 m	MPC · JPL
612449	2002 RD_{149}	—	September 11, 2002	Palomar	NEAT	·	2.1 km	MPC · JPL
612450	2002 RR_{157}	—	September 11, 2002	Palomar	NEAT	·	800 m	MPC · JPL
612451	2002 RR_{192}	—	September 12, 2002	Palomar	NEAT	·	710 m	MPC · JPL
612452	2002 RA_{209}	—	September 14, 2002	Palomar	NEAT	T_{j} (2.98) · 3:2	4.4 km	MPC · JPL
612453	2002 RG_{210}	—	September 15, 2002	Kitt Peak	Spacewatch	·	1.2 km	MPC · JPL
612454	2002 RD_{211}	—	September 14, 2002	Palomar	NEAT	THB	2.0 km	MPC · JPL
612455	2002 RD_{219}	—	September 15, 2002	Palomar	NEAT	·	470 m	MPC · JPL
612456	2002 RD_{222}	—	September 15, 2002	Haleakala	NEAT	·	1.0 km	MPC · JPL
612457	2002 RJ_{225}	—	September 13, 2002	Palomar	NEAT	·	1.3 km	MPC · JPL
612458	2002 RQ_{225}	—	September 13, 2002	Palomar	NEAT	·	1.2 km	MPC · JPL
612459	2002 RH_{240}	—	September 14, 2002	Palomar	R. Matson	·	2.3 km	MPC · JPL
612460	2002 RY_{240}	—	September 14, 2002	Palomar	R. Matson	BAP	590 m	MPC · JPL
612461	2002 RM_{242}	—	September 4, 2002	Palomar	NEAT	PHO	1.7 km	MPC · JPL
612462	2002 RG_{247}	—	September 15, 2002	Palomar	NEAT	·	760 m	MPC · JPL
612463	2002 RD_{251}	—	September 1, 2002	Palomar	NEAT	·	430 m	MPC · JPL
612464	2002 RV_{251}	—	September 12, 2002	Palomar	NEAT	NYS	970 m	MPC · JPL
612465	2002 RO_{259}	—	September 15, 2002	Palomar	NEAT	·	1.3 km	MPC · JPL
612466	2002 RN_{261}	—	September 11, 2002	Palomar	NEAT	·	1.4 km	MPC · JPL
612467	2002 RA_{267}	—	September 4, 2002	Palomar	NEAT	·	930 m	MPC · JPL
612468	2002 RQ_{268}	—	September 4, 2002	Palomar	NEAT	·	1.0 km	MPC · JPL
612469	2002 RK_{278}	—	September 10, 2002	Palomar	NEAT	·	2.2 km	MPC · JPL
612470	2002 SB	—	September 16, 2002	Palomar	NEAT	·	2.7 km	MPC · JPL
612471	2002 SJ	—	September 18, 2002	Palomar	NEAT	PHO	850 m	MPC · JPL
612472	2002 SQ	—	September 21, 2002	Palomar	NEAT	APO	380 m	MPC · JPL
612473	2002 SD_{12}	—	September 27, 2002	Palomar	NEAT	·	920 m	MPC · JPL
612474	2002 SF_{22}	—	September 26, 2002	Palomar	NEAT	(5)	1.1 km	MPC · JPL
612475	2002 SQ_{47}	—	September 30, 2002	Socorro	LINEAR	·	1.3 km	MPC · JPL
612476	2002 SA_{64}	—	September 28, 2002	Palomar	NEAT	EUP	3.2 km	MPC · JPL
612477 Csörgeierika	2002 ST_{73}	Csörgeierika	September 26, 2002	Palomar	NEAT	THM	1.6 km	MPC · JPL
612478	2002 TO_{17}	—	October 2, 2002	Socorro	LINEAR	·	870 m	MPC · JPL
612479	2002 TZ_{17}	—	October 2, 2002	Socorro	LINEAR	·	560 m	MPC · JPL
612480	2002 TR_{25}	—	October 2, 2002	Socorro	LINEAR	·	3.1 km	MPC · JPL
612481	2002 TM_{50}	—	October 2, 2002	Socorro	LINEAR	·	1.3 km	MPC · JPL
612482	2002 TR_{55}	—	October 2, 2002	Haleakala	NEAT	·	860 m	MPC · JPL
612483	2002 TV_{65}	—	October 3, 2002	Socorro	LINEAR	(5)	1.2 km	MPC · JPL
612484	2002 TS_{67}	—	October 7, 2002	Palomar	NEAT	AMO	530 m	MPC · JPL
612485	2002 TU_{68}	—	October 8, 2002	Palomar	NEAT	·	470 m	MPC · JPL
612486	2002 TK_{78}	—	October 1, 2002	Anderson Mesa	LONEOS	·	780 m	MPC · JPL
612487	2002 TC_{98}	—	October 3, 2002	Socorro	LINEAR	·	1.3 km	MPC · JPL
612488	2002 TJ_{148}	—	October 5, 2002	Palomar	NEAT	·	640 m	MPC · JPL
612489	2002 TP_{190}	—	October 13, 2002	Palomar	NEAT	H	460 m	MPC · JPL
612490	2002 TA_{228}	—	October 5, 2002	Socorro	LINEAR	·	1.5 km	MPC · JPL
612491	2002 TE_{230}	—	October 9, 2002	Kitt Peak	Spacewatch	THM	1.6 km	MPC · JPL
612492	2002 TP_{232}	—	October 6, 2002	Socorro	LINEAR	·	2.2 km	MPC · JPL
612493	2002 TX_{261}	—	October 10, 2002	Palomar	NEAT	·	810 m	MPC · JPL
612494	2002 TT_{264}	—	October 10, 2002	Socorro	LINEAR	·	1.4 km	MPC · JPL
612495	2002 TN_{306}	—	October 4, 2002	Apache Point	SDSS	·	2.5 km	MPC · JPL
612496	2002 TU_{324}	—	October 5, 2002	Apache Point	SDSS	·	2.1 km	MPC · JPL
612497	2002 TV_{328}	—	October 5, 2002	Apache Point	SDSS	·	700 m	MPC · JPL
612498	2002 TB_{338}	—	October 5, 2002	Apache Point	SDSS	·	770 m	MPC · JPL
612499	2002 TG_{342}	—	October 5, 2002	Apache Point	SDSS	·	840 m	MPC · JPL
612500	2002 TN_{343}	—	October 5, 2002	Apache Point	SDSS	·	860 m	MPC · JPL

== 612501–612600 ==
back to top

Designation			Discovery			Properties		Ref
Permanent	Provisional	Named after	Date	Site	Discoverer(s)	Category	Diam.	Ref
612501	2002 TN_{345}	—	October 5, 2002	Apache Point	SDSS	·	1.8 km	MPC · JPL
612502	2002 TY_{361}	—	October 10, 2002	Apache Point	SDSS	·	1.2 km	MPC · JPL
612503	2002 TC_{364}	—	October 10, 2002	Apache Point	SDSS	·	490 m	MPC · JPL
612504	2002 TR_{380}	—	October 5, 2002	Palomar	NEAT	·	440 m	MPC · JPL
612505	2002 TA_{381}	—	October 9, 2002	Palomar	NEAT	·	1.6 km	MPC · JPL
612506	2002 TB_{383}	—	October 15, 2002	Palomar	NEAT	·	1.0 km	MPC · JPL
612507	2002 TS_{384}	—	October 4, 2002	Apache Point	SDSS	·	560 m	MPC · JPL
612508	2002 TP_{385}	—	October 15, 2002	Palomar	NEAT	·	620 m	MPC · JPL
612509	2002 UK_{11}	—	October 29, 2002	Palomar	NEAT	APO · PHA	150 m	MPC · JPL
612510	2002 UL_{13}	—	October 28, 2002	Haleakala	NEAT	·	930 m	MPC · JPL
612511	2002 UU_{43}	—	October 30, 2002	Kitt Peak	Spacewatch	MAS	490 m	MPC · JPL
612512	2002 UJ_{58}	—	October 29, 2002	Apache Point	SDSS	·	720 m	MPC · JPL
612513	2002 UV_{58}	—	October 29, 2002	Apache Point	SDSS	·	660 m	MPC · JPL
612514	2002 UX_{58}	—	October 29, 2002	Apache Point	SDSS	·	910 m	MPC · JPL
612515	2002 UH_{59}	—	October 29, 2002	Apache Point	SDSS	·	1.8 km	MPC · JPL
612516	2002 UG_{62}	—	October 30, 2002	Apache Point	SDSS	EUP	3.4 km	MPC · JPL
612517	2002 UD_{73}	—	October 29, 2002	Palomar	NEAT	·	1.9 km	MPC · JPL
612518	2002 UF_{78}	—	October 29, 2002	Palomar	NEAT	·	580 m	MPC · JPL
612519	2002 UQ_{78}	—	October 31, 2002	Palomar	NEAT	·	550 m	MPC · JPL
612520	2002 VT_{51}	—	November 6, 2002	Anderson Mesa	LONEOS	·	700 m	MPC · JPL
612521	2002 VB_{58}	—	November 6, 2002	Haleakala	NEAT	·	580 m	MPC · JPL
612522	2002 VP_{69}	—	November 11, 2002	Socorro	LINEAR	APO +1km · PHA	800 m	MPC · JPL
612523	2002 VT_{103}	—	November 12, 2002	Socorro	LINEAR	·	1.4 km	MPC · JPL
612524	2002 VD_{130}	—	November 7, 2002	Kitt Peak	M. W. Buie	twotino	133 km	MPC · JPL
612525	2002 VM_{143}	—	November 14, 2002	Palomar	NEAT	·	590 m	MPC · JPL
612526	2002 VN_{146}	—	November 5, 2002	Palomar	NEAT	·	600 m	MPC · JPL
612527	2002 WR_{11}	—	November 27, 2002	Anderson Mesa	LONEOS	·	1.4 km	MPC · JPL
612528	2002 WJ_{23}	—	November 24, 2002	Palomar	NEAT	·	1.2 km	MPC · JPL
612529	2002 XP_{40}	—	December 11, 2002	Socorro	LINEAR	AMO	330 m	MPC · JPL
612530	2002 XF_{46}	—	December 10, 2002	Socorro	LINEAR	T_{j} (2.93)	3.0 km	MPC · JPL
612531	2002 XR_{58}	—	December 11, 2002	Socorro	LINEAR	·	880 m	MPC · JPL
612532	2002 XR_{89}	—	December 9, 2002	Mount Graham	Ryan, W. H., Stewart, L.	EOS	1.3 km	MPC · JPL
612533	2002 XV_{93}	—	December 10, 2002	Palomar	Palomar	plutino	549 km	MPC · JPL
612534	2002 YJ_{22}	—	December 31, 2002	Socorro	LINEAR	·	850 m	MPC · JPL
612535	2002 YT_{32}	—	December 27, 2002	Palomar	NEAT	THB	3.2 km	MPC · JPL
612536	2003 AA_{3}	—	January 3, 2003	Socorro	LINEAR	AMO · APO · PHA	310 m	MPC · JPL
612537	2003 AG_{71}	—	January 10, 2003	Kitt Peak	Spacewatch	·	1.0 km	MPC · JPL
612538	2003 AP_{83}	—	January 4, 2003	Kitt Peak	Deep Lens Survey	(1547)	1.1 km	MPC · JPL
612539	2003 BX_{2}	—	January 23, 2003	Socorro	LINEAR	·	1.4 km	MPC · JPL
612540	2003 BR_{35}	—	January 27, 2003	Socorro	LINEAR	·	720 m	MPC · JPL
612541	2003 DA_{16}	—	February 28, 2003	Socorro	LINEAR	T_{j} (2.78) · APO +1km	930 m	MPC · JPL
612542	2003 FP_{2}	—	March 23, 2003	Eskridge	G. Hug	T_{j} (2.89)	2.7 km	MPC · JPL
612543	2003 HL	—	April 22, 2003	Socorro	LINEAR	T_{j} (2.99)	2.3 km	MPC · JPL
612544	2003 HH_{7}	—	April 24, 2003	Kitt Peak	Spacewatch	·	770 m	MPC · JPL
612545	2003 HW_{18}	—	April 25, 2003	Kitt Peak	Spacewatch	·	960 m	MPC · JPL
612546	2003 HA_{53}	—	April 29, 2003	Kitt Peak	Spacewatch	T_{j} (2.96)	3.9 km	MPC · JPL
612547	2003 HD_{57}	—	April 26, 2003	Mauna Kea	Mauna Kea	plutino	125 km	MPC · JPL
612548	2003 HE_{57}	—	April 26, 2003	Mauna Kea	Mauna Kea	cubewano (hot)	160 km	MPC · JPL
612549	2003 HG_{57}	—	April 26, 2003	Mauna Kea	Mauna Kea	cubewano (cold) · moon	183 km	MPC · JPL
612550	2003 JE_{4}	—	May 1, 2003	Kitt Peak	Spacewatch	·	680 m	MPC · JPL
612551	2003 KJ_{8}	—	May 23, 2003	Kitt Peak	Spacewatch	EUN	730 m	MPC · JPL
612552	2003 KW_{16}	—	May 29, 2003	Socorro	LINEAR	AMO	320 m	MPC · JPL
612553	2003 MZ_{2}	—	June 26, 2003	Socorro	LINEAR	·	1.5 km	MPC · JPL
612554	2003 NA_{6}	—	July 4, 2003	Kitt Peak	Spacewatch	·	3.1 km	MPC · JPL
612555	2003 NB_{6}	—	July 4, 2003	Kitt Peak	Spacewatch	·	1.5 km	MPC · JPL
612556	2003 OA_{3}	—	July 20, 2003	Palomar	NEAT	AMO	430 m	MPC · JPL
612557	2003 OF_{3}	—	July 23, 2003	Palomar	NEAT	·	1.5 km	MPC · JPL
612558	2003 OB_{4}	—	July 23, 2003	Palomar	NEAT	AMO	440 m	MPC · JPL
612559	2003 OX_{7}	—	July 24, 2003	Palomar	NEAT	·	460 m	MPC · JPL
612560	2003 OX_{16}	—	July 30, 2003	Socorro	LINEAR	·	490 m	MPC · JPL
612561	2003 PQ	—	August 2, 2003	Kleť	J. Tichá, M. Tichý	·	960 m	MPC · JPL
612562	2003 PB_{11}	—	August 5, 2003	Socorro	LINEAR	·	820 m	MPC · JPL
612563	2003 QA	—	August 16, 2003	Costitx	OAM	APO	710 m	MPC · JPL
612564	2003 QO_{28}	—	August 22, 2003	Palomar	NEAT	·	1.8 km	MPC · JPL
612565	2003 QX_{28}	—	August 23, 2003	Palomar	NEAT	·	830 m	MPC · JPL
612566	2003 QV_{32}	—	August 21, 2003	Campo Imperatore	CINEOS	(5)	1.2 km	MPC · JPL
612567	2003 QN_{36}	—	August 22, 2003	Palomar	NEAT	·	1.0 km	MPC · JPL
612568	2003 QC_{43}	—	August 22, 2003	Palomar	NEAT	·	2.1 km	MPC · JPL
612569	2003 QQ_{56}	—	August 23, 2003	Socorro	LINEAR	·	1.1 km	MPC · JPL
612570	2003 QQ_{68}	—	August 25, 2003	Socorro	LINEAR	·	670 m	MPC · JPL
612571	2003 QY_{72}	—	August 24, 2003	Socorro	LINEAR	·	2.0 km	MPC · JPL
612572	2003 QL_{90}	—	August 28, 2003	Cerro Tololo	I. P. Griffin	NYS	870 m	MPC · JPL
612573	2003 QV_{90}	—	August 23, 2003	Cerro Tololo	M. W. Buie	cubewano (cold)	123 km	MPC · JPL
612574	2003 QB_{91}	—	August 24, 2003	Cerro Tololo	M. W. Buie	plutino	220 km	MPC · JPL
612575	2003 QK_{91}	—	August 25, 2003	Cerro Tololo	M. W. Buie	SDO	135 km	MPC · JPL
612576	2003 QO_{91}	—	August 23, 2003	Cerro Tololo	M. W. Buie	cubewano (hot)	178 km	MPC · JPL
612577	2003 QQ_{91}	—	August 23, 2003	Cerro Tololo	M. W. Buie	other TNO	102 km	MPC · JPL
612578	2003 QR_{91}	—	August 24, 2003	Cerro Tololo	M. W. Buie	cubewano (cold) · moon	207 km	MPC · JPL
612579	2003 QT_{91}	—	August 25, 2003	Cerro Tololo	M. W. Buie	cubewano (cold)	118 km	MPC · JPL
612580	2003 QA_{92}	—	August 24, 2003	Cerro Tololo	M. W. Buie	other TNO	165 km	MPC · JPL
612581	2003 QX_{111}	—	August 25, 2003	Cerro Tololo	M. W. Buie	plutino	434 km	MPC · JPL
612582	2003 QY_{111}	—	August 25, 2003	Cerro Tololo	M. W. Buie	cubewano (cold)	128 km	MPC · JPL
612583	2003 QZ_{111}	—	August 26, 2003	Cerro Tololo	M. W. Buie	cubewano (cold)	125 km	MPC · JPL
612584	2003 QX_{113}	—	August 31, 2003	Mauna Kea	M. W. Buie	SDO	371 km	MPC · JPL
612585	2003 RV	—	September 1, 2003	Socorro	LINEAR	·	610 m	MPC · JPL
612586	2003 RL_{7}	—	September 4, 2003	Campo Imperatore	CINEOS	·	1.0 km	MPC · JPL
612587	2003 RS_{8}	—	September 7, 2003	Socorro	LINEAR	·	1.2 km	MPC · JPL
612588	2003 RM_{9}	—	September 4, 2003	Socorro	LINEAR	·	3.1 km	MPC · JPL
612589	2003 RW_{10}	—	September 14, 2003	Anderson Mesa	LONEOS	AMO	520 m	MPC · JPL
612590	2003 SW_{5}	—	September 16, 2003	Kitt Peak	Spacewatch	·	1.0 km	MPC · JPL
612591	2003 SU_{7}	—	September 16, 2003	Palomar	NEAT	·	1.5 km	MPC · JPL
612592	2003 SE_{15}	—	September 17, 2003	Kitt Peak	Spacewatch	NYS	940 m	MPC · JPL
612593	2003 SQ_{15}	—	September 18, 2003	Socorro	LINEAR	APO	560 m	MPC · JPL
612594	2003 SC_{42}	—	September 19, 2003	Palomar	NEAT	·	1 km	MPC · JPL
612595	2003 SM_{58}	—	September 17, 2003	Anderson Mesa	LONEOS	·	1.3 km	MPC · JPL
612596	2003 SJ_{76}	—	September 18, 2003	Kitt Peak	Spacewatch	·	410 m	MPC · JPL
612597	2003 SQ_{83}	—	September 18, 2003	Kitt Peak	Spacewatch	·	2.5 km	MPC · JPL
612598	2003 ST_{83}	—	September 18, 2003	Palomar	NEAT	·	930 m	MPC · JPL
612599	2003 SC_{84}	—	September 18, 2003	Socorro	LINEAR	·	550 m	MPC · JPL
612600	2003 SM_{84}	—	September 20, 2003	Socorro	LINEAR	AMO	90 m	MPC · JPL

== 612601–612700 ==
back to top

Designation			Discovery			Properties		Ref
Permanent	Provisional	Named after	Date	Site	Discoverer(s)	Category	Diam.	Ref
612601	2003 SD_{95}	—	September 19, 2003	Kitt Peak	Spacewatch	·	1.1 km	MPC · JPL
612602	2003 SV_{104}	—	September 20, 2003	Socorro	LINEAR	(5)	1.1 km	MPC · JPL
612603	2003 SF_{111}	—	September 16, 2003	Palomar	NEAT	·	2.2 km	MPC · JPL
612604	2003 SC_{124}	—	September 18, 2003	Palomar	NEAT	·	1.2 km	MPC · JPL
612605	2003 SE_{139}	—	September 19, 2003	Anderson Mesa	LONEOS	·	2.0 km	MPC · JPL
612606	2003 SN_{167}	—	September 22, 2003	Kitt Peak	Spacewatch	·	970 m	MPC · JPL
612607	2003 SX_{190}	—	September 17, 2003	Kitt Peak	Spacewatch	·	1.3 km	MPC · JPL
612608	2003 SD_{201}	—	September 26, 2003	Palomar	NEAT	T_{j} (2.81) · AMO +1km	900 m	MPC · JPL
612609	2003 SJ_{208}	—	September 23, 2003	Palomar	NEAT	(5)	1.1 km	MPC · JPL
612610	2003 SO_{215}	—	September 19, 2003	Mount Graham	Mount Graham	MAS	470 m	MPC · JPL
612611	2003 SJ_{239}	—	September 27, 2003	Kitt Peak	Spacewatch	·	1.9 km	MPC · JPL
612612	2003 SP_{241}	—	September 27, 2003	Kitt Peak	Spacewatch	KOR	990 m	MPC · JPL
612613	2003 SU_{261}	—	September 27, 2003	Socorro	LINEAR	·	2.0 km	MPC · JPL
612614	2003 SE_{262}	—	September 27, 2003	Kitt Peak	Spacewatch	·	1.2 km	MPC · JPL
612615	2003 SU_{267}	—	September 29, 2003	Kitt Peak	Spacewatch	·	790 m	MPC · JPL
612616	2003 SC_{278}	—	September 30, 2003	Socorro	LINEAR	·	740 m	MPC · JPL
612617	2003 SM_{280}	—	September 18, 2003	Palomar	NEAT	·	1.1 km	MPC · JPL
612618	2003 SB_{307}	—	September 30, 2003	Kitt Peak	Spacewatch	·	2.0 km	MPC · JPL
612619	2003 SN_{317}	—	September 25, 2003	Mauna Kea	Mauna Kea	cubewano (cold) · moon	168 km	MPC · JPL
612620	2003 SQ_{317}	—	September 25, 2003	Mauna Kea	Mauna Kea	Haumea	90 km	MPC · JPL
612621	2003 SR_{317}	—	September 25, 2003	Mauna Kea	Mauna Kea	plutino	138 km	MPC · JPL
612622	2003 SW_{322}	—	September 16, 2003	Kitt Peak	Spacewatch	·	1.3 km	MPC · JPL
612623	2003 SN_{323}	—	September 16, 2003	Kitt Peak	Spacewatch	·	900 m	MPC · JPL
612624	2003 SA_{325}	—	September 17, 2003	Kitt Peak	Spacewatch	·	1.5 km	MPC · JPL
612625	2003 SC_{325}	—	September 17, 2003	Kitt Peak	Spacewatch	KON	2.1 km	MPC · JPL
612626	2003 SX_{328}	—	September 21, 2003	Kitt Peak	Spacewatch	·	850 m	MPC · JPL
612627	2003 SN_{330}	—	September 26, 2003	Apache Point	SDSS	·	2.1 km	MPC · JPL
612628	2003 SW_{334}	—	September 26, 2003	Apache Point	SDSS	·	2.7 km	MPC · JPL
612629	2003 SQ_{336}	—	September 27, 2003	Apache Point	SDSS	·	1.7 km	MPC · JPL
612630	2003 SP_{338}	—	September 26, 2003	Apache Point	SDSS	·	1.5 km	MPC · JPL
612631	2003 SH_{341}	—	September 16, 2003	Kitt Peak	Spacewatch	NYS	900 m	MPC · JPL
612632	2003 SC_{349}	—	September 18, 2003	Kitt Peak	Spacewatch	·	1.5 km	MPC · JPL
612633	2003 SZ_{353}	—	September 22, 2003	Palomar	NEAT	·	650 m	MPC · JPL
612634	2003 SN_{354}	—	September 22, 2003	Anderson Mesa	LONEOS	·	950 m	MPC · JPL
612635	2003 SZ_{354}	—	September 24, 2003	Palomar	NEAT	(5)	1.0 km	MPC · JPL
612636	2003 SJ_{357}	—	September 20, 2003	Kitt Peak	Spacewatch	·	1.4 km	MPC · JPL
612637	2003 SJ_{358}	—	September 20, 2003	Kitt Peak	Spacewatch	·	970 m	MPC · JPL
612638	2003 ST_{359}	—	September 21, 2003	Kitt Peak	Spacewatch	·	1.7 km	MPC · JPL
612639	2003 SD_{360}	—	September 21, 2003	Kitt Peak	Spacewatch	·	590 m	MPC · JPL
612640	2003 SL_{362}	—	September 22, 2003	Kitt Peak	Spacewatch	(5)	850 m	MPC · JPL
612641	2003 SR_{362}	—	September 22, 2003	Kitt Peak	Spacewatch	·	970 m	MPC · JPL
612642	2003 SA_{364}	—	September 26, 2003	Apache Point	SDSS	·	1.3 km	MPC · JPL
612643	2003 SL_{391}	—	September 26, 2003	Apache Point	SDSS	·	2.2 km	MPC · JPL
612644	2003 SB_{397}	—	September 26, 2003	Apache Point	SDSS	·	2.1 km	MPC · JPL
612645	2003 SQ_{407}	—	September 27, 2003	Apache Point	SDSS	·	1.2 km	MPC · JPL
612646	2003 SD_{423}	—	September 17, 2003	Kitt Peak	Spacewatch	·	830 m	MPC · JPL
612647	2003 SC_{428}	—	September 16, 2003	Kitt Peak	Spacewatch	·	460 m	MPC · JPL
612648	2003 SJ_{429}	—	September 21, 2003	Anderson Mesa	LONEOS	·	930 m	MPC · JPL
612649	2003 SY_{429}	—	September 28, 2003	Kitt Peak	Spacewatch	NYS	660 m	MPC · JPL
612650	2003 SL_{430}	—	September 16, 2003	Kitt Peak	Spacewatch	·	1.2 km	MPC · JPL
612651	2003 SU_{431}	—	September 16, 2003	Kitt Peak	Spacewatch	·	1.2 km	MPC · JPL
612652	2003 SC_{432}	—	September 18, 2003	Kitt Peak	Spacewatch	·	1.9 km	MPC · JPL
612653	2003 SF_{432}	—	September 18, 2003	Kitt Peak	Spacewatch	·	1.9 km	MPC · JPL
612654	2003 TN_{17}	—	October 15, 2003	Palomar	NEAT	EUN	1.0 km	MPC · JPL
612655	2003 TG_{26}	—	October 1, 2003	Kitt Peak	Spacewatch	·	1.1 km	MPC · JPL
612656	2003 TC_{38}	—	October 2, 2003	Kitt Peak	Spacewatch	·	1.8 km	MPC · JPL
612657	2003 TO_{38}	—	October 2, 2003	Kitt Peak	Spacewatch	·	2.0 km	MPC · JPL
612658	2003 TH_{58}	—	October 3, 2003	Mauna Kea	Mauna Kea	plutino	166 km	MPC · JPL
612659	2003 TD_{59}	—	October 5, 2003	Kitt Peak	Spacewatch	·	1.6 km	MPC · JPL
612660	2003 UK	—	October 16, 2003	Palomar	NEAT	·	1.1 km	MPC · JPL
612661	2003 UT_{3}	—	October 16, 2003	Kitt Peak	Spacewatch	·	440 m	MPC · JPL
612662	2003 UC_{8}	—	October 19, 2003	Kitt Peak	Spacewatch	·	860 m	MPC · JPL
612663	2003 UB_{32}	—	October 16, 2003	Kitt Peak	Spacewatch	·	920 m	MPC · JPL
612664	2003 UD_{34}	—	October 17, 2003	Kitt Peak	Spacewatch	·	1.6 km	MPC · JPL
612665	2003 UW_{36}	—	October 16, 2003	Palomar	NEAT	·	550 m	MPC · JPL
612666	2003 UM_{52}	—	October 18, 2003	Palomar	NEAT	·	2.0 km	MPC · JPL
612667	2003 UH_{57}	—	October 26, 2003	Uppsala-Kvistaberg	Uppsala-DLR Asteroid Survey	NYS	1.2 km	MPC · JPL
612668	2003 UF_{71}	—	October 18, 2003	Kitt Peak	Spacewatch	NYS	760 m	MPC · JPL
612669	2003 UD_{77}	—	October 17, 2003	Kitt Peak	Spacewatch	·	1.2 km	MPC · JPL
612670	2003 UJ_{78}	—	October 17, 2003	Anderson Mesa	LONEOS	·	1.5 km	MPC · JPL
612671	2003 UU_{95}	—	October 18, 2003	Kitt Peak	Spacewatch	·	810 m	MPC · JPL
612672	2003 UB_{127}	—	October 21, 2003	Kitt Peak	Spacewatch	·	1.4 km	MPC · JPL
612673	2003 UF_{137}	—	October 21, 2003	Socorro	LINEAR	THB	2.7 km	MPC · JPL
612674	2003 US_{181}	—	October 21, 2003	Kitt Peak	Spacewatch	·	1.1 km	MPC · JPL
612675	2003 UP_{182}	—	October 21, 2003	Palomar	NEAT	·	600 m	MPC · JPL
612676	2003 UZ_{182}	—	October 21, 2003	Palomar	NEAT	·	1.8 km	MPC · JPL
612677	2003 UM_{189}	—	October 22, 2003	Kitt Peak	Spacewatch	·	1.0 km	MPC · JPL
612678	2003 UM_{191}	—	October 23, 2003	Anderson Mesa	LONEOS	PHO	850 m	MPC · JPL
612679	2003 UC_{207}	—	October 22, 2003	Haleakala	NEAT	MAS	810 m	MPC · JPL
612680	2003 UM_{210}	—	October 23, 2003	Kitt Peak	Spacewatch	·	1.3 km	MPC · JPL
612681	2003 US_{232}	—	October 24, 2003	Socorro	LINEAR	·	1.1 km	MPC · JPL
612682	2003 UQ_{234}	—	October 24, 2003	Kitt Peak	Spacewatch	·	530 m	MPC · JPL
612683	2003 UB_{236}	—	October 22, 2003	Kitt Peak	Spacewatch	LIX	2.9 km	MPC · JPL
612684	2003 UZ_{247}	—	October 25, 2003	Kitt Peak	Spacewatch	·	1.7 km	MPC · JPL
612685	2003 UP_{248}	—	October 25, 2003	Kitt Peak	Spacewatch	·	700 m	MPC · JPL
612686	2003 UH_{269}	—	October 29, 2003	Socorro	LINEAR	T_{j} (2.98)	2.2 km	MPC · JPL
612687	2003 UN_{284}	—	October 24, 2003	Kitt Peak	L. H. Wasserman, D. E. Trilling, E. I. Chiang, J. R. Lovering	cubewano (cold) · moon	124 km	MPC · JPL
612688	2003 UT_{292}	—	October 24, 2003	Kitt Peak	M. W. Buie	plutino	186 km	MPC · JPL
612689	2003 UY_{295}	—	October 16, 2003	Kitt Peak	Spacewatch	·	1.4 km	MPC · JPL
612690	2003 UQ_{317}	—	October 23, 2003	Apache Point	SDSS	·	1.0 km	MPC · JPL
612691	2003 UE_{325}	—	October 17, 2003	Apache Point	SDSS	THB	2.6 km	MPC · JPL
612692	2003 UR_{325}	—	October 17, 2003	Apache Point	SDSS	·	2.0 km	MPC · JPL
612693	2003 UE_{329}	—	October 17, 2003	Apache Point	SDSS	·	1.9 km	MPC · JPL
612694	2003 UU_{332}	—	October 18, 2003	Apache Point	SDSS	·	470 m	MPC · JPL
612695	2003 UY_{334}	—	October 18, 2003	Apache Point	SDSS	·	1.0 km	MPC · JPL
612696	2003 UU_{335}	—	October 18, 2003	Apache Point	SDSS	·	1.2 km	MPC · JPL
612697	2003 UX_{336}	—	October 18, 2003	Apache Point	SDSS	(5)	1.1 km	MPC · JPL
612698	2003 UC_{342}	—	October 19, 2003	Apache Point	SDSS	·	1.9 km	MPC · JPL
612699	2003 UC_{347}	—	October 19, 2003	Apache Point	SDSS	·	2.0 km	MPC · JPL
612700	2003 UH_{359}	—	October 19, 2003	Kitt Peak	Spacewatch	·	940 m	MPC · JPL

== 612701–612800 ==
back to top

Designation			Discovery			Properties		Ref
Permanent	Provisional	Named after	Date	Site	Discoverer(s)	Category	Diam.	Ref
612701	2003 UX_{378}	—	October 22, 2003	Apache Point	SDSS	·	750 m	MPC · JPL
612702	2003 UP_{380}	—	October 22, 2003	Apache Point	SDSS	AGN	800 m	MPC · JPL
612703	2003 UC_{397}	—	October 22, 2003	Apache Point	SDSS	·	2.3 km	MPC · JPL
612704	2003 VA_{3}	—	November 14, 2003	Palomar	NEAT	T_{j} (2.89)	2.9 km	MPC · JPL
612705	2003 VK_{7}	—	November 15, 2003	Kitt Peak	Spacewatch	·	700 m	MPC · JPL
612706	2003 WA_{3}	—	November 18, 2003	Catalina	CSS	·	1.1 km	MPC · JPL
612707	2003 WP_{4}	—	November 16, 2003	Kitt Peak	Spacewatch	·	1.0 km	MPC · JPL
612708	2003 WQ_{14}	—	November 16, 2003	Kitt Peak	Spacewatch	ERI	940 m	MPC · JPL
612709	2003 WX_{17}	—	November 19, 2003	Kitt Peak	Spacewatch	·	2.1 km	MPC · JPL
612710	2003 WH_{23}	—	November 18, 2003	Kitt Peak	Spacewatch	·	710 m	MPC · JPL
612711	2003 WW_{30}	—	November 18, 2003	Kitt Peak	Spacewatch	·	980 m	MPC · JPL
612712	2003 WQ_{36}	—	November 19, 2003	Socorro	LINEAR	(194)	2.2 km	MPC · JPL
612713	2003 WP_{87}	—	November 22, 2003	Kitt Peak	Spacewatch	·	750 m	MPC · JPL
612714	2003 WP_{102}	—	November 21, 2003	Socorro	LINEAR	T_{j} (2.98)	3.0 km	MPC · JPL
612715	2003 WT_{104}	—	November 21, 2003	Socorro	LINEAR	BAR	1.1 km	MPC · JPL
612716	2003 WK_{105}	—	November 21, 2003	Socorro	LINEAR	·	800 m	MPC · JPL
612717	2003 WJ_{116}	—	November 20, 2003	Socorro	LINEAR	·	1.2 km	MPC · JPL
612718	2003 WS_{142}	—	November 21, 2003	Palomar	NEAT	·	1.2 km	MPC · JPL
612719	2003 WU_{188}	—	November 24, 2003	Kitt Peak	M. W. Buie	cubewano (cold) · moon	178 km	MPC · JPL
612720	2003 XK_{21}	—	December 14, 2003	Kitt Peak	Spacewatch	·	3.4 km	MPC · JPL
612721	2003 XC_{22}	—	December 3, 2003	Socorro	LINEAR	·	1.4 km	MPC · JPL
612722	2003 XR_{30}	—	December 1, 2003	Kitt Peak	Spacewatch	·	2.1 km	MPC · JPL
612723	2003 YP_{17}	—	December 20, 2003	Socorro	LINEAR	AMO	540 m	MPC · JPL
612724	2003 YO_{80}	—	December 18, 2003	Socorro	LINEAR	T_{j} (2.92)	3.5 km	MPC · JPL
612725	2003 YV_{97}	—	December 19, 2003	Socorro	LINEAR	(1547)	1.5 km	MPC · JPL
612726	2003 YT_{110}	—	December 27, 2003	Socorro	LINEAR	·	1.2 km	MPC · JPL
612727	2003 YG_{115}	—	December 27, 2003	Socorro	LINEAR	·	1.2 km	MPC · JPL
612728	2003 YG_{139}	—	December 28, 2003	Socorro	LINEAR	·	3.3 km	MPC · JPL
612729	2003 YF_{148}	—	December 29, 2003	Socorro	LINEAR	·	1.4 km	MPC · JPL
612730	2003 YC_{157}	—	December 16, 2003	Kitt Peak	Spacewatch	·	1.7 km	MPC · JPL
612731	2003 YX_{162}	—	December 17, 2003	Socorro	LINEAR	EUP	3.6 km	MPC · JPL
612732	2003 YQ_{179}	—	December 24, 2003	Mauna Kea	Mauna Kea	SDO	147 km	MPC · JPL
612733	2003 YU_{179}	—	December 24, 2003	Mauna Kea	Mauna Kea	cubewano (cold) · moon	139 km	MPC · JPL
612734	2003 YB_{181}	—	December 21, 2003	Apache Point	SDSS	·	3.4 km	MPC · JPL
612735	2004 AV_{2}	—	January 13, 2004	Mount Graham	Mount Graham	TIR	1.7 km	MPC · JPL
612736	2004 AR_{10}	—	January 15, 2004	Kitt Peak	Spacewatch	H	400 m	MPC · JPL
612737	2004 AN_{25}	—	January 12, 2004	Palomar	NEAT	·	1.7 km	MPC · JPL
612738	2004 BM_{68}	—	January 22, 2004	Palomar	NEAT	·	2.8 km	MPC · JPL
612739	2004 BR_{92}	—	January 27, 2004	Anderson Mesa	LONEOS	·	1.1 km	MPC · JPL
612740	2004 BC_{100}	—	January 28, 2004	Kitt Peak	Spacewatch	·	1.9 km	MPC · JPL
612741	2004 BF_{101}	—	January 28, 2004	Kitt Peak	Spacewatch	·	1.0 km	MPC · JPL
612742	2004 BC_{103}	—	January 31, 2004	Socorro	LINEAR	·	1.4 km	MPC · JPL
612743	2004 BA_{118}	—	January 29, 2004	Socorro	LINEAR	·	1.2 km	MPC · JPL
612744	2004 BR_{140}	—	January 19, 2004	Kitt Peak	Spacewatch	THM	1.7 km	MPC · JPL
612745	2004 BP_{143}	—	January 19, 2004	Kitt Peak	Spacewatch	·	1.3 km	MPC · JPL
612746	2004 BN_{148}	—	January 16, 2004	Kitt Peak	Spacewatch	·	950 m	MPC · JPL
612747	2004 CQ_{19}	—	February 11, 2004	Kitt Peak	Spacewatch	·	3.8 km	MPC · JPL
612748	2004 CT_{25}	—	February 11, 2004	Kitt Peak	Spacewatch	·	1.5 km	MPC · JPL
612749	2004 CN_{29}	—	February 12, 2004	Kitt Peak	Spacewatch	EOS	1.5 km	MPC · JPL
612750	2004 CP_{49}	—	February 14, 2004	Haleakala	NEAT	AMO	480 m	MPC · JPL
612751	2004 CH_{52}	—	February 14, 2004	Catalina	CSS	·	280 m	MPC · JPL
612752	2004 CQ_{90}	—	February 12, 2004	Palomar	NEAT	·	1.2 km	MPC · JPL
612753	2004 CO_{119}	—	February 12, 2004	Kitt Peak	Spacewatch	·	670 m	MPC · JPL
612754	2004 CE_{122}	—	February 12, 2004	Kitt Peak	Spacewatch	·	1.6 km	MPC · JPL
612755	2004 DX_{1}	—	February 18, 2004	Nogales	Tenagra II	H	450 m	MPC · JPL
612756	2004 DG_{29}	—	February 17, 2004	Kitt Peak	Spacewatch	·	1.1 km	MPC · JPL
612757	2004 DN_{57}	—	February 23, 2004	Socorro	LINEAR	·	4.2 km	MPC · JPL
612758	2004 EH_{9}	—	March 14, 2004	Socorro	LINEAR	·	1.5 km	MPC · JPL
612759	2004 EO_{16}	—	March 12, 2004	Palomar	NEAT	·	3.1 km	MPC · JPL
612760	2004 EO_{20}	—	March 15, 2004	Socorro	LINEAR	AMO	120 m	MPC · JPL
612761	2004 EU_{20}	—	March 15, 2004	Socorro	LINEAR	T_{j} (2.78)	1.3 km	MPC · JPL
612762	2004 EW_{24}	—	March 15, 2004	Kitt Peak	Spacewatch	·	780 m	MPC · JPL
612763	2004 EY_{24}	—	March 15, 2004	Kitt Peak	Spacewatch	H	430 m	MPC · JPL
612764	2004 EU_{29}	—	March 15, 2004	Kitt Peak	Spacewatch	·	1.5 km	MPC · JPL
612765	2004 EH_{54}	—	March 11, 2004	Palomar	NEAT	·	1.1 km	MPC · JPL
612766	2004 EQ_{58}	—	March 15, 2004	Socorro	LINEAR	·	1.2 km	MPC · JPL
612767	2004 FC_{22}	—	March 16, 2004	Kitt Peak	Spacewatch	·	2.1 km	MPC · JPL
612768	2004 FJ_{61}	—	March 19, 2004	Socorro	LINEAR	·	930 m	MPC · JPL
612769	2004 FG_{84}	—	March 18, 2004	Kitt Peak	Spacewatch	·	2.3 km	MPC · JPL
612770	2004 FF_{103}	—	March 23, 2004	Kitt Peak	Spacewatch	·	840 m	MPC · JPL
612771	2004 FE_{132}	—	March 23, 2004	Kitt Peak	Spacewatch	·	1.7 km	MPC · JPL
612772	2004 FU_{148}	—	March 16, 2004	Kitt Peak	M. W. Buie, D. E. Trilling, L. H. Wasserman, R. L. Millis	plutino	160 km	MPC · JPL
612773	2004 GX_{88}	—	April 13, 2004	Kitt Peak	Spacewatch	·	1.1 km	MPC · JPL
612774	2004 HK_{12}	—	April 21, 2004	Socorro	LINEAR	·	280 m	MPC · JPL
612775	2004 HB_{48}	—	April 22, 2004	Siding Spring	SSS	T_{j} (2.97)	1.7 km	MPC · JPL
612776	2004 KF_{5}	—	May 19, 2004	Kitt Peak	Spacewatch	·	460 m	MPC · JPL
612777	2004 LU_{3}	—	June 12, 2004	Socorro	LINEAR	AMO	670 m	MPC · JPL
612778	2004 LR_{22}	—	June 14, 2004	Socorro	LINEAR	·	2.2 km	MPC · JPL
612779	2004 LH_{31}	—	June 14, 2004	Kitt Peak	Spacewatch	·	530 m	MPC · JPL
612780	2004 MD	—	June 16, 2004	Socorro	LINEAR	APO · PHA	330 m	MPC · JPL
612781	2004 MW_{2}	—	June 20, 2004	Socorro	LINEAR	APO	470 m	MPC · JPL
612782	2004 NL	—	July 8, 2004	Reedy Creek	J. Broughton	·	1.3 km	MPC · JPL
612783	2004 NV_{19}	—	July 14, 2004	Socorro	LINEAR	·	1.2 km	MPC · JPL
612784	2004 NO_{20}	—	July 14, 2004	Socorro	LINEAR	·	830 m	MPC · JPL
612785	2004 NH_{26}	—	July 11, 2004	Socorro	LINEAR	·	1.1 km	MPC · JPL
612786	2004 PJ_{2}	—	August 8, 2004	Socorro	LINEAR	APO · PHA	180 m	MPC · JPL
612787 Haumannpéter	2004 PP_{26}	Haumannpéter	August 8, 2004	Piszkéstető	K. Sárneczky, T. Szalai	·	1.1 km	MPC · JPL
612788	2004 PW_{27}	—	August 9, 2004	Siding Spring	SSS	·	1.1 km	MPC · JPL
612789	2004 PF_{45}	—	August 7, 2004	Palomar	NEAT	·	810 m	MPC · JPL
612790	2004 PH_{62}	—	August 10, 2004	Campo Imperatore	CINEOS	·	990 m	MPC · JPL
612791	2004 PR_{78}	—	August 9, 2004	Anderson Mesa	LONEOS	THB	2.3 km	MPC · JPL
612792	2004 PU_{104}	—	August 15, 2004	Reedy Creek	J. Broughton	·	2.0 km	MPC · JPL
612793	2004 PW_{107}	—	August 13, 2004	Cerro Tololo	M. W. Buie	res · 4:7	148 km	MPC · JPL
612794	2004 PY_{107}	—	August 14, 2004	Cerro Tololo	M. W. Buie	cubewano (cold)	177 km	MPC · JPL
612795	2004 PA_{108}	—	August 14, 2004	Cerro Tololo	M. W. Buie	cubewano (cold)	141 km	MPC · JPL
612796	2004 PS_{108}	—	August 10, 2004	Socorro	LINEAR	EUN	1.2 km	MPC · JPL
612797	2004 PJ_{109}	—	August 12, 2004	Campo Imperatore	CINEOS	·	810 m	MPC · JPL
612798	2004 PA_{112}	—	August 13, 2004	Cerro Tololo	M. W. Buie	other TNO	118 km	MPC · JPL
612799	2004 QB_{15}	—	August 22, 2004	Kitt Peak	Spacewatch	EOS	1.1 km	MPC · JPL
612800	2004 QC_{17}	—	August 25, 2004	Socorro	LINEAR	AMO	570 m	MPC · JPL

== 612801–612900 ==
back to top

Designation			Discovery			Properties		Ref
Permanent	Provisional	Named after	Date	Site	Discoverer(s)	Category	Diam.	Ref
612801	2004 QD_{17}	—	August 25, 2004	Socorro	LINEAR	AMO	380 m	MPC · JPL
612802	2004 QQ_{26}	—	August 17, 2004	Mauna Kea	D. J. Tholen	centaur	79 km	MPC · JPL
612803	2004 RP_{9}	—	September 6, 2004	Socorro	LINEAR	PHO	1 km	MPC · JPL
612804	2004 RC_{10}	—	September 7, 2004	Socorro	LINEAR	·	1.2 km	MPC · JPL
612805	2004 RD_{23}	—	September 7, 2004	Kitt Peak	Spacewatch	MAS	760 m	MPC · JPL
612806	2004 RR_{24}	—	September 8, 2004	Kleť	Kleť	·	980 m	MPC · JPL
612807	2004 RU_{36}	—	September 7, 2004	Socorro	LINEAR	·	1.5 km	MPC · JPL
612808	2004 RJ_{41}	—	September 7, 2004	Kitt Peak	Spacewatch	NYS	880 m	MPC · JPL
612809	2004 RL_{53}	—	September 8, 2004	Socorro	LINEAR	(5)	1.1 km	MPC · JPL
612810	2004 RO_{75}	—	September 8, 2004	Socorro	LINEAR	·	1.2 km	MPC · JPL
612811	2004 RM_{80}	—	September 8, 2004	Socorro	LINEAR	NYS	980 m	MPC · JPL
612812	2004 RQ_{80}	—	September 8, 2004	Socorro	LINEAR	·	870 m	MPC · JPL
612813	2004 RF_{84}	—	September 10, 2004	Socorro	LINEAR	APO · PHA	750 m	MPC · JPL
612814	2004 RG_{84}	—	September 10, 2004	Socorro	LINEAR	H	270 m	MPC · JPL
612815	2004 RS_{84}	—	September 8, 2004	Palomar	NEAT	H	500 m	MPC · JPL
612816	2004 RK_{85}	—	September 9, 2004	Bergisch Gladbach	W. Bickel	·	780 m	MPC · JPL
612817	2004 RG_{103}	—	September 8, 2004	Palomar	NEAT	·	1.8 km	MPC · JPL
612818	2004 RO_{107}	—	September 9, 2004	Socorro	LINEAR	NYS	1 km	MPC · JPL
612819	2004 RV_{109}	—	September 11, 2004	Socorro	LINEAR	T_{j} (2.91)	1.8 km	MPC · JPL
612820	2004 RJ_{111}	—	September 10, 2004	Socorro	LINEAR	·	1.2 km	MPC · JPL
612821	2004 RD_{117}	—	September 7, 2004	Kitt Peak	Spacewatch	NYS	830 m	MPC · JPL
612822	2004 RH_{131}	—	September 7, 2004	Kitt Peak	Spacewatch	MAS	640 m	MPC · JPL
612823	2004 RH_{146}	—	September 9, 2004	Socorro	LINEAR	(5)	1.1 km	MPC · JPL
612824	2004 RM_{146}	—	September 9, 2004	Socorro	LINEAR	·	1.6 km	MPC · JPL
612825	2004 RJ_{151}	—	September 9, 2004	Socorro	LINEAR	(5)	870 m	MPC · JPL
612826	2004 RH_{154}	—	September 10, 2004	Socorro	LINEAR	·	870 m	MPC · JPL
612827	2004 RY_{154}	—	September 10, 2004	Socorro	LINEAR	·	840 m	MPC · JPL
612828	2004 RM_{168}	—	September 8, 2004	Socorro	LINEAR	·	1.1 km	MPC · JPL
612829	2004 RA_{172}	—	September 9, 2004	Socorro	LINEAR	·	990 m	MPC · JPL
612830	2004 RV_{183}	—	September 10, 2004	Socorro	LINEAR	·	1.5 km	MPC · JPL
612831	2004 RZ_{194}	—	September 10, 2004	Socorro	LINEAR	·	1.2 km	MPC · JPL
612832	2004 RF_{199}	—	September 10, 2004	Socorro	LINEAR	·	1.3 km	MPC · JPL
612833	2004 RL_{201}	—	September 10, 2004	Eskridge	Farpoint	·	1.5 km	MPC · JPL
612834	2004 RK_{208}	—	September 11, 2004	Socorro	LINEAR	·	1.5 km	MPC · JPL
612835	2004 RF_{219}	—	September 11, 2004	Socorro	LINEAR	EUN	1.0 km	MPC · JPL
612836	2004 RA_{234}	—	September 9, 2004	Kitt Peak	Spacewatch	·	960 m	MPC · JPL
612837	2004 RS_{240}	—	September 10, 2004	Kitt Peak	Spacewatch	MAS	580 m	MPC · JPL
612838	2004 RL_{270}	—	September 11, 2004	Kitt Peak	Spacewatch	·	640 m	MPC · JPL
612839	2004 RT_{275}	—	September 13, 2004	Kitt Peak	Spacewatch	·	900 m	MPC · JPL
612840	2004 RK_{276}	—	September 13, 2004	Kitt Peak	Spacewatch	·	840 m	MPC · JPL
612841	2004 RQ_{278}	—	September 15, 2004	Kitt Peak	Spacewatch	·	2.3 km	MPC · JPL
612842	2004 RK_{279}	—	September 15, 2004	Kitt Peak	Spacewatch	·	990 m	MPC · JPL
612843	2004 RD_{282}	—	September 15, 2004	Kitt Peak	Spacewatch	·	3.3 km	MPC · JPL
612844	2004 RS_{289}	—	September 9, 2004	Kitt Peak	Spacewatch	·	1.1 km	MPC · JPL
612845	2004 RG_{290}	—	September 8, 2004	Socorro	LINEAR	·	920 m	MPC · JPL
612846	2004 RF_{299}	—	September 11, 2004	Kitt Peak	Spacewatch	·	980 m	MPC · JPL
612847	2004 RO_{307}	—	September 13, 2004	Socorro	LINEAR	·	1.1 km	MPC · JPL
612848	2004 RO_{312}	—	September 15, 2004	Anderson Mesa	LONEOS	·	760 m	MPC · JPL
612849	2004 RJ_{318}	—	September 12, 2004	Kitt Peak	Spacewatch	·	1.3 km	MPC · JPL
612850	2004 RE_{337}	—	September 15, 2004	Kitt Peak	Spacewatch	·	930 m	MPC · JPL
612851	2004 RK_{340}	—	September 6, 2004	Socorro	LINEAR	(895)	3.6 km	MPC · JPL
612852	2004 ST_{7}	—	September 17, 2004	Kitt Peak	Spacewatch	·	1.1 km	MPC · JPL
612853	2004 SJ_{17}	—	September 17, 2004	Anderson Mesa	LONEOS	·	1.1 km	MPC · JPL
612854	2004 SJ_{23}	—	September 17, 2004	Kitt Peak	Spacewatch	·	2.1 km	MPC · JPL
612855	2004 SL_{34}	—	September 17, 2004	Kitt Peak	Spacewatch	(5)	700 m	MPC · JPL
612856	2004 TP_{1}	—	October 5, 2004	Anderson Mesa	LONEOS	APO · PHA	250 m	MPC · JPL
612857	2004 TM_{3}	—	October 4, 2004	Kitt Peak	Spacewatch	·	1.0 km	MPC · JPL
612858	2004 TN_{12}	—	October 7, 2004	Kitt Peak	Spacewatch	H	520 m	MPC · JPL
612859	2004 TP_{14}	—	October 10, 2004	Socorro	LINEAR	H	530 m	MPC · JPL
612860	2004 TC_{15}	—	October 7, 2004	Socorro	LINEAR	·	1.2 km	MPC · JPL
612861	2004 TA_{17}	—	October 10, 2004	Socorro	LINEAR	·	3.0 km	MPC · JPL
612862	2004 TW_{25}	—	October 4, 2004	Kitt Peak	Spacewatch	·	700 m	MPC · JPL
612863	2004 TD_{64}	—	October 5, 2004	Kitt Peak	Spacewatch	(5)	1.1 km	MPC · JPL
612864	2004 TF_{64}	—	October 5, 2004	Kitt Peak	Spacewatch	V	520 m	MPC · JPL
612865	2004 TB_{83}	—	October 5, 2004	Kitt Peak	Spacewatch	·	1.3 km	MPC · JPL
612866	2004 TK_{87}	—	October 5, 2004	Kitt Peak	Spacewatch	·	550 m	MPC · JPL
612867	2004 TY_{90}	—	October 5, 2004	Kitt Peak	Spacewatch	·	1.7 km	MPC · JPL
612868	2004 TW_{96}	—	October 5, 2004	Kitt Peak	Spacewatch	KOR	1.1 km	MPC · JPL
612869	2004 TZ_{100}	—	October 6, 2004	Kitt Peak	Spacewatch	V	600 m	MPC · JPL
612870	2004 TK_{112}	—	October 7, 2004	Palomar	NEAT	·	1.5 km	MPC · JPL
612871	2004 TH_{120}	—	October 6, 2004	Palomar	NEAT	·	920 m	MPC · JPL
612872	2004 TP_{130}	—	October 7, 2004	Palomar	NEAT	·	1.2 km	MPC · JPL
612873	2004 TK_{139}	—	October 9, 2004	Anderson Mesa	LONEOS	·	800 m	MPC · JPL
612874	2004 TL_{150}	—	October 6, 2004	Kitt Peak	Spacewatch	(5)	650 m	MPC · JPL
612875	2004 TC_{155}	—	October 6, 2004	Kitt Peak	Spacewatch	·	2.1 km	MPC · JPL
612876	2004 TF_{161}	—	October 6, 2004	Kitt Peak	Spacewatch	·	790 m	MPC · JPL
612877	2004 TY_{165}	—	October 7, 2004	Kitt Peak	Spacewatch	NYS	820 m	MPC · JPL
612878	2004 TL_{182}	—	October 7, 2004	Kitt Peak	Spacewatch	MAS	560 m	MPC · JPL
612879	2004 TS_{185}	—	October 7, 2004	Kitt Peak	Spacewatch	·	880 m	MPC · JPL
612880	2004 TH_{194}	—	October 7, 2004	Kitt Peak	Spacewatch	·	940 m	MPC · JPL
612881	2004 TY_{203}	—	October 7, 2004	Kitt Peak	Spacewatch	·	730 m	MPC · JPL
612882	2004 TU_{229}	—	October 8, 2004	Kitt Peak	Spacewatch	·	1.3 km	MPC · JPL
612883	2004 TF_{282}	—	October 15, 2004	Kitt Peak	M. W. Buie	SDO	208 km	MPC · JPL
612884	2004 TJ_{283}	—	October 8, 2004	Kitt Peak	Spacewatch	·	1.7 km	MPC · JPL
612885	2004 TU_{291}	—	October 10, 2004	Kitt Peak	Spacewatch	·	760 m	MPC · JPL
612886	2004 TT_{310}	—	October 10, 2004	Socorro	LINEAR	PHO	1.3 km	MPC · JPL
612887	2004 TX_{323}	—	October 11, 2004	Kitt Peak	Spacewatch	·	950 m	MPC · JPL
612888	2004 TP_{334}	—	October 10, 2004	Kitt Peak	Spacewatch	·	650 m	MPC · JPL
612889	2004 TS_{337}	—	October 12, 2004	Kitt Peak	Spacewatch	·	680 m	MPC · JPL
612890	2004 TG_{347}	—	October 6, 2004	Palomar	NEAT	·	2.6 km	MPC · JPL
612891	2004 TT_{357}	—	October 15, 2004	Kitt Peak	M. W. Buie	res · 2:5	100 km	MPC · JPL
612892	2004 TV_{357}	—	October 15, 2004	Kitt Peak	M. W. Buie	twotino	164 km	MPC · JPL
612893	2004 TU_{368}	—	October 8, 2004	Kitt Peak	Spacewatch	NYS	910 m	MPC · JPL
612894	2004 UF_{5}	—	October 18, 2004	Kitt Peak	M. W. Buie	·	830 m	MPC · JPL
612895	2004 VT_{11}	—	November 3, 2004	Catalina	CSS	·	3.3 km	MPC · JPL
612896	2004 VH_{35}	—	November 3, 2004	Kitt Peak	Spacewatch	·	1.1 km	MPC · JPL
612897	2004 VD_{69}	—	November 10, 2004	Kitt Peak	Spacewatch	·	2.2 km	MPC · JPL
612898	2004 VV_{74}	—	November 3, 2004	Anderson Mesa	LONEOS	H	390 m	MPC · JPL
612899	2004 VG_{82}	—	November 10, 2004	Kitt Peak	M. W. Buie	·	1.1 km	MPC · JPL
612900	2004 XX_{5}	—	December 9, 2004	Kitt Peak	Spacewatch	H	580 m	MPC · JPL

== 612901–613000 ==
back to top

Designation			Discovery			Properties		Ref
Permanent	Provisional	Named after	Date	Site	Discoverer(s)	Category	Diam.	Ref
612901	2004 XP_{14}	—	December 10, 2004	Socorro	LINEAR	APO · PHA · slow	390 m	MPC · JPL
612902	2004 XH_{18}	—	December 8, 2004	Socorro	LINEAR	·	1.8 km	MPC · JPL
612903	2004 XJ_{22}	—	December 8, 2004	Socorro	LINEAR	·	2.6 km	MPC · JPL
612904	2004 XT_{30}	—	December 10, 2004	Needville	J. Dellinger, Wells, D.	·	1.1 km	MPC · JPL
612905	2004 XF_{51}	—	December 12, 2004	Kitt Peak	Spacewatch	·	960 m	MPC · JPL
612906	2004 XX_{71}	—	December 12, 2004	Kitt Peak	Spacewatch	EUN	1.2 km	MPC · JPL
612907	2004 XC_{90}	—	December 11, 2004	Kitt Peak	Spacewatch	·	670 m	MPC · JPL
612908	2004 XH_{105}	—	December 11, 2004	Socorro	LINEAR	·	3.2 km	MPC · JPL
612909	2004 XR_{133}	—	December 15, 2004	Socorro	LINEAR	·	2.5 km	MPC · JPL
612910	2004 XK_{143}	—	December 9, 2004	Kitt Peak	Spacewatch	(5)	850 m	MPC · JPL
612911	2004 XR_{190}	—	December 11, 2004	Mauna Kea	Mauna Kea	other TNO	502 km	MPC · JPL
612912	2004 YF	—	December 17, 2004	Socorro	LINEAR	·	1.2 km	MPC · JPL
612913	2004 YS_{13}	—	December 18, 2004	Mount Lemmon	Mount Lemmon Survey	NYS	800 m	MPC · JPL
612914	2004 YB_{26}	—	December 19, 2004	Mount Lemmon	Mount Lemmon Survey	·	3.0 km	MPC · JPL
612915	2005 AY	—	January 1, 2005	Catalina	CSS	·	1.0 km	MPC · JPL
612916 Stirlingcolgate	2005 AR_{22}	Stirlingcolgate	January 7, 2005	Nogales	M. Ory	·	1.0 km	MPC · JPL
612917	2005 AO_{24}	—	January 7, 2005	Catalina	CSS	T_{j} (2.97)	2.6 km	MPC · JPL
612918	2005 AN_{31}	—	January 11, 2005	Socorro	LINEAR	·	2.4 km	MPC · JPL
612919	2005 AD_{32}	—	January 11, 2005	Socorro	LINEAR	·	990 m	MPC · JPL
612920	2005 AL_{32}	—	January 11, 2005	Socorro	LINEAR	EUP	3.6 km	MPC · JPL
612921	2005 AY_{42}	—	January 15, 2005	Socorro	LINEAR	·	2.4 km	MPC · JPL
612922	2005 BY_{1}	—	January 18, 2005	Kitt Peak	Spacewatch	T_{j} (2.73) · APO +1km	880 m	MPC · JPL
612923	2005 BX_{45}	—	January 16, 2005	Mauna Kea	Veillet, C.	·	1.0 km	MPC · JPL
612924	2005 CL	—	February 2, 2005	Socorro	LINEAR	APO · PHA	310 m	MPC · JPL
612925	2005 CT_{3}	—	February 1, 2005	Kitt Peak	Spacewatch	·	880 m	MPC · JPL
612926	2005 CU_{7}	—	February 4, 2005	Socorro	LINEAR	T_{j} (2.98)	4.1 km	MPC · JPL
612927	2005 CF_{13}	—	February 2, 2005	Kitt Peak	Spacewatch	·	1.1 km	MPC · JPL
612928	2005 CB_{19}	—	February 2, 2005	Palomar	NEAT	·	2.1 km	MPC · JPL
612929	2005 CR_{37}	—	February 8, 2005	Črni Vrh	Mikuž, H.	AMO · APO +1km	1.2 km	MPC · JPL
612930	2005 CM_{55}	—	February 4, 2005	Mount Lemmon	Mount Lemmon Survey	MAS	570 m	MPC · JPL
612931	2005 CA_{79}	—	February 1, 2005	Palomar	Palomar	twotino	346 km	MPC · JPL
612932	2005 CP_{80}	—	February 1, 2005	Kitt Peak	Spacewatch	·	3.6 km	MPC · JPL
612933	2005 EH_{9}	—	March 2, 2005	Kitt Peak	Spacewatch	·	1.1 km	MPC · JPL
612934	2005 ER_{38}	—	March 4, 2005	Kitt Peak	Spacewatch	·	1.6 km	MPC · JPL
612935	2005 EZ_{82}	—	March 4, 2005	Kitt Peak	Spacewatch	NYS	960 m	MPC · JPL
612936	2005 EO_{90}	—	March 8, 2005	Mount Lemmon	Mount Lemmon Survey	·	2.0 km	MPC · JPL
612937	2005 EZ_{92}	—	March 8, 2005	Socorro	LINEAR	·	1.3 km	MPC · JPL
612938	2005 EH_{110}	—	March 4, 2005	Mount Lemmon	Mount Lemmon Survey	·	2.8 km	MPC · JPL
612939	2005 EE_{135}	—	March 9, 2005	Mount Lemmon	Mount Lemmon Survey	·	1.4 km	MPC · JPL
612940	2005 EU_{159}	—	March 9, 2005	Mount Lemmon	Mount Lemmon Survey	THM	2.0 km	MPC · JPL
612941	2005 EZ_{164}	—	March 11, 2005	Kitt Peak	Spacewatch	EUP	2.8 km	MPC · JPL
612942	2005 EZ_{165}	—	March 11, 2005	Kitt Peak	Spacewatch	·	540 m	MPC · JPL
612943	2005 EO_{192}	—	March 11, 2005	Mount Lemmon	Mount Lemmon Survey	·	1.6 km	MPC · JPL
612944	2005 EH_{208}	—	March 4, 2005	Kitt Peak	Spacewatch	·	1.2 km	MPC · JPL
612945	2005 EB_{212}	—	March 4, 2005	Socorro	LINEAR	·	1.1 km	MPC · JPL
612946 Žirmūnai	2005 EE_{220}	Žirmūnai	March 10, 2005	Moletai	K. Černis	·	1.9 km	MPC · JPL
612947	2005 EH_{235}	—	March 10, 2005	Mount Lemmon	Mount Lemmon Survey	·	1.5 km	MPC · JPL
612948	2005 EB_{237}	—	March 11, 2005	Kitt Peak	Spacewatch	·	1.4 km	MPC · JPL
612949	2005 EQ_{255}	—	March 11, 2005	Mount Lemmon	Mount Lemmon Survey	·	1.2 km	MPC · JPL
612950	2005 EY_{296}	—	March 9, 2005	Kitt Peak	M. W. Buie	·	1.5 km	MPC · JPL
612951	2005 EB_{299}	—	March 11, 2005	Kitt Peak	M. W. Buie	centaur	101 km	MPC · JPL
612952	2005 EZ_{300}	—	March 11, 2005	Kitt Peak	M. W. Buie	plutino	149 km	MPC · JPL
612953	2005 ER_{318}	—	March 12, 2005	Kitt Peak	M. W. Buie	res · 3:4	90 km	MPC · JPL
612954	2005 FF_{3}	—	March 22, 2005	Socorro	LINEAR	·	1.4 km	MPC · JPL
612955	2005 GK	—	April 1, 2005	Catalina	CSS	APO	290 m	MPC · JPL
612956	2005 GM_{26}	—	April 2, 2005	Mount Lemmon	Mount Lemmon Survey	·	1.4 km	MPC · JPL
612957	2005 GE_{47}	—	April 5, 2005	Mount Lemmon	Mount Lemmon Survey	·	2.4 km	MPC · JPL
612958	2005 GM_{50}	—	April 5, 2005	Kitt Peak	Spacewatch	·	1.8 km	MPC · JPL
612959	2005 GB_{61}	—	April 1, 2005	Anderson Mesa	LONEOS	·	2.1 km	MPC · JPL
612960	2005 GW_{64}	—	April 2, 2005	Catalina	CSS	·	1.8 km	MPC · JPL
612961	2005 GC_{73}	—	April 4, 2005	Catalina	CSS	·	3.1 km	MPC · JPL
612962	2005 GG_{109}	—	April 10, 2005	Mount Lemmon	Mount Lemmon Survey	·	1.2 km	MPC · JPL
612963	2005 GL_{131}	—	April 10, 2005	Kitt Peak	Spacewatch	·	2.2 km	MPC · JPL
612964	2005 GQ_{177}	—	April 15, 2005	Kitt Peak	Spacewatch	·	3.2 km	MPC · JPL
612965	2005 GX_{189}	—	April 12, 2005	Kitt Peak	M. W. Buie	·	510 m	MPC · JPL
612966	2005 GL_{190}	—	April 12, 2005	Kitt Peak	M. W. Buie	·	850 m	MPC · JPL
612967	2005 GF_{195}	—	April 10, 2005	Kitt Peak	M. W. Buie	·	820 m	MPC · JPL
612968	2005 GN_{203}	—	April 9, 2005	Junk Bond	Junk Bond	·	1.1 km	MPC · JPL
612969	2005 GH_{217}	—	April 2, 2005	Kitt Peak	Spacewatch	·	1.5 km	MPC · JPL
612970	2005 HN_{3}	—	April 21, 2005	Socorro	LINEAR	ATE	210 m	MPC · JPL
612971	2005 HM_{7}	—	April 30, 2005	Kitt Peak	Spacewatch	·	2.8 km	MPC · JPL
612972	2005 JW_{12}	—	May 4, 2005	Mauna Kea	Veillet, C.	·	1.3 km	MPC · JPL
612973	2005 JD_{13}	—	May 4, 2005	Mauna Kea	Veillet, C.	BRG	1.1 km	MPC · JPL
612974	2005 JL_{18}	—	May 4, 2005	Mount Lemmon	Mount Lemmon Survey	·	1.4 km	MPC · JPL
612975	2005 JO_{19}	—	May 4, 2005	Mount Lemmon	Mount Lemmon Survey	·	2.1 km	MPC · JPL
612976	2005 JP_{26}	—	May 3, 2005	Kitt Peak	Spacewatch	·	1.3 km	MPC · JPL
612977	2005 JO_{52}	—	May 4, 2005	Kitt Peak	Spacewatch	·	1.0 km	MPC · JPL
612978	2005 JW_{68}	—	May 6, 2005	Socorro	LINEAR	·	2.8 km	MPC · JPL
612979	2005 JL_{80}	—	May 10, 2005	Kitt Peak	Spacewatch	·	1.0 km	MPC · JPL
612980	2005 JZ_{80}	—	May 2, 2005	Kitt Peak	Deep Lens Survey	·	2.3 km	MPC · JPL
612981	2005 JR_{86}	—	May 8, 2005	Kitt Peak	Spacewatch	·	1.7 km	MPC · JPL
612982	2005 JU_{108}	—	May 14, 2005	Socorro	LINEAR	AMO	410 m	MPC · JPL
612983	2005 JP_{117}	—	May 10, 2005	Kitt Peak	Spacewatch	·	500 m	MPC · JPL
612984	2005 JA_{140}	—	May 14, 2005	Kitt Peak	Spacewatch	·	990 m	MPC · JPL
612985	2005 JA_{175}	—	May 10, 2005	Cerro Tololo	M. W. Buie	cubewano (hot)	288 km	MPC · JPL
612986	2005 LZ_{23}	—	June 5, 2005	Kitt Peak	Spacewatch	H	480 m	MPC · JPL
612987	2005 LM_{25}	—	June 8, 2005	Kitt Peak	Spacewatch	·	810 m	MPC · JPL
612988	2005 LP_{39}	—	June 11, 2005	Kitt Peak	Spacewatch	·	1.2 km	MPC · JPL
612989	2005 LW_{39}	—	June 15, 2005	Socorro	LINEAR	APO · PHA	350 m	MPC · JPL
612990	2005 LT_{40}	—	June 10, 2005	Kitt Peak	Spacewatch	·	530 m	MPC · JPL
612991	2005 MX_{1}	—	June 21, 2005	Palomar	NEAT	AMO · APO	450 m	MPC · JPL
612992	2005 MY_{6}	—	June 27, 2005	Kitt Peak	Spacewatch	·	1.6 km	MPC · JPL
612993	2005 MW_{32}	—	June 29, 2005	Kitt Peak	Spacewatch	·	2.0 km	MPC · JPL
612994	2005 NU_{1}	—	July 1, 2005	Kitt Peak	Spacewatch	·	970 m	MPC · JPL
612995	2005 NU_{9}	—	July 1, 2005	Kitt Peak	Spacewatch	(13314)	1.5 km	MPC · JPL
612996	2005 ND_{10}	—	July 3, 2005	Mount Lemmon	Mount Lemmon Survey	·	610 m	MPC · JPL
612997	2005 NG_{16}	—	July 2, 2005	Kitt Peak	Spacewatch	·	750 m	MPC · JPL
612998	2005 NN_{33}	—	July 5, 2005	Kitt Peak	Spacewatch	MAS	500 m	MPC · JPL
612999	2005 NA_{37}	—	July 6, 2005	Kitt Peak	Spacewatch	·	920 m	MPC · JPL
613000	2005 NX_{38}	—	July 7, 2005	Kitt Peak	Spacewatch	PHO	780 m	MPC · JPL

back to top

== Meaning of names ==
As minor planet discoveries are confirmed, they are given a permanent number by the IAU's Minor Planet Center (MPC), and the discoverers can then submit names for them, following the IAU's naming conventions. The list below concerns those minor planets in the specified number-range that have received names, and explains the meanings of those names.

Official naming citations of newly named small Solar System bodies are approved and published in a bulletin by IAU's Working Group for Small Bodies Nomenclature (WGSBN). Before May 2021, citations were published in MPC's Minor Planet Circulars for many decades. Recent citations can also be found on the JPL Small-Body Database (SBDB). Until his death in 2016, German astronomer Lutz D. Schmadel compiled these citations into the Dictionary of Minor Planet Names (DMP) and regularly updated the collection.

Based on Paul Herget's The Names of the Minor Planets, Schmadel also researched the unclear origin of numerous asteroids, most of which had been named prior to World War II. This article incorporates text from this source, which is in the public domain: SBDB New namings may only be added to this list below after official publication as the preannouncement of names is condemned. The WGSBN publishes a comprehensive guideline for the naming rules of non-cometary small Solar System bodies.

Named minor planet	Provisional	This minor planet was named for...	Ref · Catalog
612163 Thelowes	2000 LG_{10}	Thomas (b. 1959) and Clare (b. 1963) Lowe, dear friends of the second discoverer.	IAU · 612163
612477 Csörgeierika	2002 ST_{73}	Erika Csörgei (b. 1971), the wife of Tibor Csörgei, a Slovak amateur astronomer	IAU · 612477
612787 Haumannpéter	2004 PP_{26}	Péter Haumann (1941–2022), a Hungarian actor.	IAU · 612787
612916 Stirlingcolgate	2005 AR_{22}	Stirling Colgate (1925–2013), an American nuclear physicist.	IAU · 612916
612946 Žirmūnai	2005 EE_{220}	Žirmūnai, the most populous administrative division in the Lithuanian capital city Vilnius.	IAU · 612946
