= Helium focusing cone =

A helium focusing cone is a concentration of helium atoms that has passed through the Sun's heliosphere and is concentrated in a conical region on the opposite side from where the particles entered.

== See also ==
- Solar wind
