= (612584) 2003 QX113 =

Trans-Neptunian object

(612584) 2003 QX_{113}
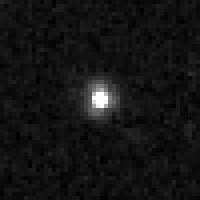
- Hubble Space Telescope image of 2003 QX_{113} taken in 2006

Discovery
- Discovered by: CFEPS
- Discovery site: Mauna Kea Obs.
- Discovery date: 31 August 2003

Designations
- Alternative designations: L3q03
- Minor planet category: TNO · SDO; near-scattered (DES)

Orbital characteristics
- Epoch 1 July 2021 (JD 2459396.5)
- Uncertainty parameter 2 · 3
- Observation arc: 14.34 yr (5,236 d)
- Aphelion: 62.238 AU
- Perihelion: 37.674 AU
- Semi-major axis: 49.956 AU
- Eccentricity: 0.2459
- Orbital period (sidereal): 353.09 yr (128,966 d)
- Mean anomaly: 141.21°
- Mean motion: 0° 0^{m} 10.08^{s} / day
- Inclination: 6.7261°
- Longitude of ascending node: 158.07°
- Argument of perihelion: 26.381°
- Known satellites: 0

Physical characteristics
- Mean diameter: 423 km (est.)
- Apparent magnitude: 22.85
- Absolute magnitude (H): 5.1

(612584) 2003 QX_{113} is a trans-Neptunian object from the scattered disc located in the outermost region of the Solar System. It was discovered by astronomers with the Canada–France Ecliptic Plane Survey at Mauna Kea Observatories, Hawaii, when it was near aphelion on 31 August 2003.

== Orbit and classification ==
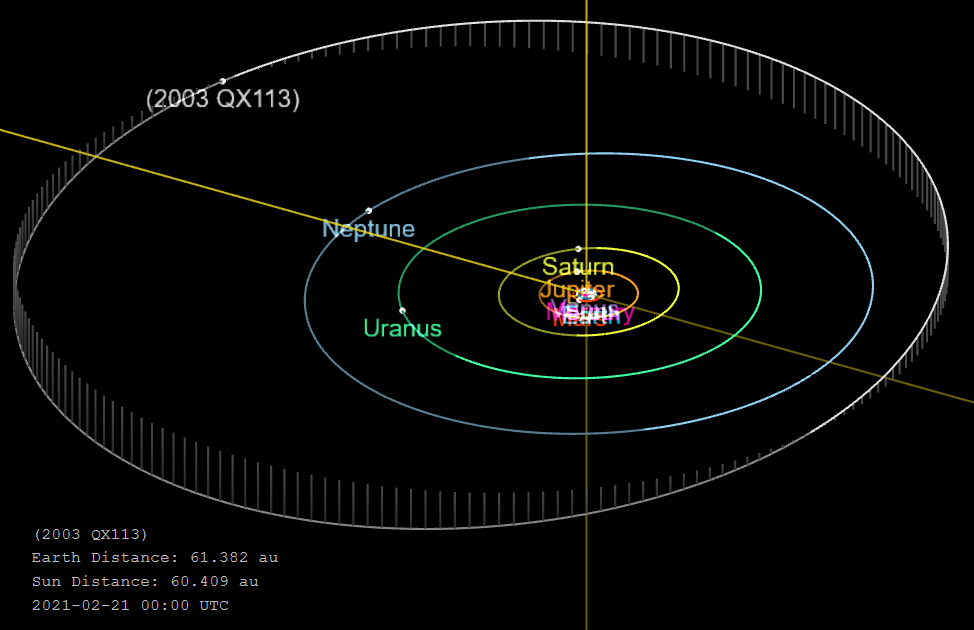
Orbital diagram of 2003 QX_{113}

2003 QX_{113} orbits the Sun at a distance of 37.7–62.2 AU once every 353 years and 1 month (128,966 days; semi-major axis of 49.96 AU). Its orbit has an eccentricity of 0.25 and an inclination of 7° with respect to the ecliptic.

2003 QX_{113} last came to perihelion around 1882, moving away from the Sun ever since and is currently about 60.5 AU from the Sun, and will reach its aphelion around 2058.

It is classified as a scattered disc object, or "near-scattered" object in the classification of the Deep Ecliptic Survey, that still gravitationally interacts with Neptune (30.1 AU) due to its relatively low perihelion of 37.7 AU, contrary to the extended-scattered/detached objects and sednoids which never approach Neptune as close. It has also been described as a "detached classical belt object" by the discovering Canada–France Ecliptic Plane Survey (CFEPS), that are objects with a semi-major axis beyond the 2:1 mean-motion resonance (i.e. beyond the twotino population at 47.8 AU) and with an eccentricity larger than 0.24. It was the furthest object discovered in the CFEPS.

== Physical characteristics ==
Based on a generic magnitude-to-diameter conversion, 2003 QX_{113} measures approximately 423 kilometers (260 miles) in diameter, for an assumed albedo of 0.9 and a magnitude of 5.1. As of 2021, no rotational lightcurve for this object has been obtained from photometric observations. The body's rotation period, pole and shape remain unknown.

== See also ==
- (148209) 2000 CR105
