= List of objects at Lagrange points =

This is a list of known objects which occupy, have occupied, or are planned to occupy any of the five Lagrange points of two-body systems in space.

A diagram showing the five Lagrange points in a two-body system

== Sun–Earth Lagrange points ==
=== Sun–Earth L_{1} ===
L_{1} is the Lagrange point located approximately 1.5 million kilometers from Earth towards the Sun.

==== Past probes ====
- International Cometary Explorer, formerly the International Sun–Earth Explorer 3 (ISEE-3), diverted out of L_{1} in 1983 for a comet rendezvous mission. Currently in heliocentric orbit. The Sun–Earth L_{1} is also the point to which the Reboot ISEE-3 mission was attempting to return the craft as the first phase of a recovery mission (as of September 25, 2014 all efforts have failed and contact was lost).
- NASA's Genesis probe collected solar wind samples at L_{1} from December 3, 2001, to April 1, 2004, when it returned the sample capsule to Earth. It returned briefly in late 2004 before being pushed into heliocentric orbit in early 2005.
- LISA Pathfinder (LPF) was launched on 3 December 2015, and arrived at L_{1} on 22 January 2016, where, among other experiments, it tested the technology needed by (e)LISA to detect gravitational waves. LISA Pathfinder used an instrument consisting of two small gold alloy cubes.
- The Chang'e 5 orbiter (during extended mission. After ferrying lunar samples back to Earth in 2020, the transport module was sent to L_{1} where it is permanently stationed to conduct limited Earth-Sun observations.)

==== Present probes ====
- Animation of Deep Space Climate Observatory's trajectory from 11 February 2015 to 12 October 2025 DSCOVR · Earth · Moon
  The Solar and Heliospheric Observatory (SOHO) in a halo orbit around L1 to investigate of the outer layer of the Sun, making observations of solar wind and associated phenomena in the vicinity of L1, probing the interior structure of the Sun.
- The Advanced Composition Explorer (ACE) in a Lissajous orbit
- WIND (At L_{1} since 2004)
- The Deep Space Climate Observatory (DSCOVR), designed to image the sunlit Earth in 10 wavelengths (EPIC) and monitor total reflected radiation (NISTAR). Launched on 11 February 2015, began orbiting L_{1} on 8 June 2015 to study the solar wind and its effects on Earth. DSCOVR is unofficially known as GORESAT, because it carries a camera always oriented to Earth and capturing full-frame photos of the planet similar to the Blue Marble. This concept was proposed by then-Vice President of the United States Al Gore in 1998 and was a centerpiece in his 2006 film An Inconvenient Truth.
- Aditya-L1 was successfully launched on 2 September 2023 and entered the halo orbit around the lagrange point on 6 January 2024. It is a Solar observation mission by ISRO. It will study solar atmosphere, solar magnetic storms, and their impact on the environment around the Earth.
- IMAP, launched in September 2025
- SWFO-L1, launched in September 2025. Upon arrival at L_{1} on 23 January 2026, it was renamed to SOLAR-1. It became fully operational on 10 June 2026.
- Carruthers Geocorona Observatory, launched in September 2025

==== Planned probes ====
- NEO Surveyor
- NEOMIR, ESA's planetary defense early warning and NEO detection space telescope

=== Sun–Earth L_{2} ===
L_{2} is the Lagrange point located approximately 1.5 million kilometers from Earth in the direction opposite the Sun. Spacecraft at the Sun–Earth L_{2} point are in a Lissajous orbit until decommissioned, when they are sent into a heliocentric graveyard orbit.

==== Past probes ====
Animation of Wilkinson Microwave Anisotropy Probe's trajectory from 1 July 2001 to 7 April 2009 WMAP · Earth

- 2001 – 2010: NASA's Wilkinson Microwave Anisotropy Probe (WMAP) observed the cosmic microwave background. It was moved to a heliocentric orbit to avoid posing a hazard to future missions.
- 2003 – 2004: NASA's WIND. The spacecraft then went to Earth orbit, before heading to the L_{1} point, where it remains in service.
- 2009 – 2013: The ESA Herschel Space Observatory exhausted its supply of liquid helium and was moved from the Lagrangian point in June 2013.
- 2009 – 2013: At the end of its mission ESA's Planck spacecraft was put into a heliocentric orbit and passivated to prevent it from endangering any future missions.
- 2011 – 2012: CNSA's Chang'e 2. Chang'e 2 was then placed onto a heliocentric orbit that took it past the near-Earth asteroid 4179 Toutatis.
- The CNSA Chang'e 6 orbiter
- 2013 – 2025: The ESA Gaia mission’s thrusters moved the spacecraft away from L2 on 27 March 2025 and into a stable retirement orbit around the Sun that will minimise the chance that it comes within 10 million km of Earth for at least the next century.

==== Present probes ====
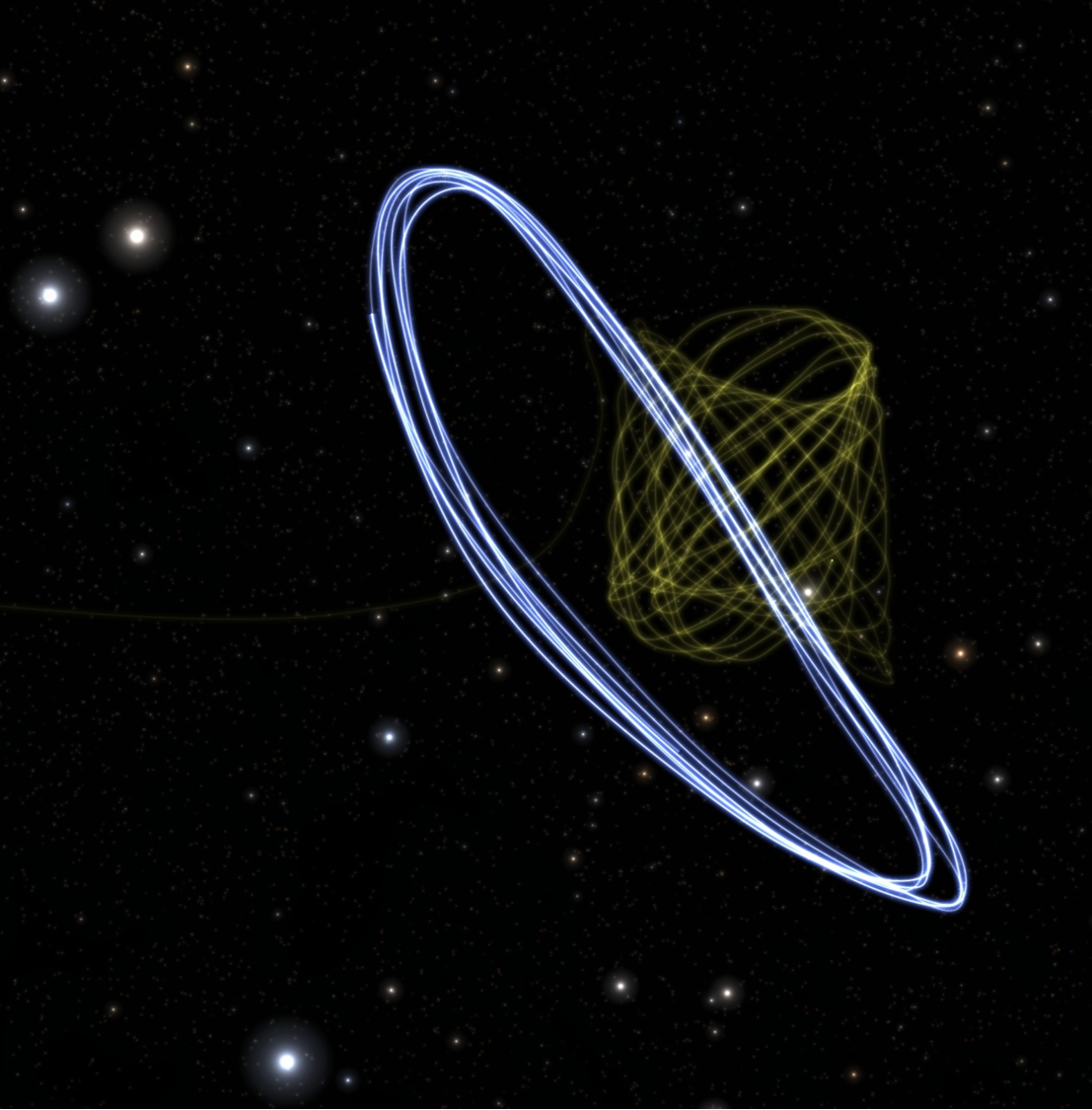
Gaia and James Webb Space Telescope orbit around Sun-Earth L_{2}

- The joint Russian-German high-energy astrophysics observatory Spektr-RG
- The joint NASA, ESA and CSA James Webb Space Telescope (JWST)
- The ESA Euclid mission
- The NASA Nancy Grace Roman Space Telescope

==== Planned probes ====
- The ESA PLATO mission, which will find and characterize rocky exoplanets.
- The joint ESA-JAXA Comet Interceptor
- The ESA ARIEL mission, which will observe the atmospheres of exoplanets.
- The JAXA LiteBIRD mission.
- The ESA Advanced Telescope for High Energy Astrophysics (Athena)
- The NASA Habitable Worlds Observatory (HWO) which would replace the Hubble Space Telescope.

==== Cancelled probes ====
- The ESA Eddington mission
- The NASA Terrestrial Planet Finder mission (may be placed in an Earth-trailing orbit instead)
- The joint ESA-JAXA SPICA mission

=== Sun–Earth L_{3} ===
L_{3} is the Sun–Earth Lagrange point located on the side of the Sun opposite Earth, slightly outside the Earth's orbit. Direct communication with spacecraft in this position is blocked by the Sun.

- There are no known objects in this orbital location.

=== Sun–Earth L_{4} ===
L_{4} is the Sun–Earth Lagrange point located close to the Earth's orbit 60° ahead of Earth.

- Asteroid (706765) 2010 TK7 is the first discovered tadpole orbit companion to Earth, orbiting L_{4}; like Earth, its mean distance to the Sun is about one astronomical unit.
- Asteroid (614689) 2020 XL5 is the second Earth trojan, confirmed in November 2021, oscillating around L_{4} in a tadpole orbit and expected to remain there for at least 4000 years, until destabilized by Venus.
- STEREO A (Solar TErrestrial RElations Observatory – Ahead) made its closest pass to L_{4} in September 2009, on its orbit around the Sun, slightly faster than Earth.
- OSIRIS-REx passed near the L4 point and performed a survey for asteroids between 9 and 20 February 2017.

=== Sun–Earth L_{5} ===
L_{5}, or Earth-trailing orbit, is the Sun–Earth Lagrange point located close to the Earth's orbit 60° behind Earth.

- Asteroid (419624) 2010 SO16, in a horseshoe companion orbit with Earth, is currently proximal to L_{5} but at a high inclination.
- STEREO B (Solar TErrestrial RElations Observatory – Behind) made its closest pass to L_{5} in October 2009, on its orbit around the Sun, slightly slower than Earth.
- The Spitzer Space Telescope is in an Earth-trailing heliocentric orbit drifting away c. 0.1 AU per year. In c. 2013–15 it has passed L_{5} in its orbit.
- Hayabusa2 passed near L_{5} during the spring of 2017, and imaged the surrounding area to search for Earth trojans on 18 April 2018.

==== Planned ====
- Vigil (ESA), solar activity monitoring mission, collaborating with NOAA's SWFO-L1

== Earth–Moon Lagrange points ==
=== Earth–Moon L2 ===
- THEMIS
- Chang'e 5-T1
- Queqiao relay satellite
- EQUULEUS nanosat

==== Planned ====
- LUMIO – Planned lunar exploration mission

=== Earth–Moon L4 and L5 ===
- Kordylewski clouds

==== Past probes ====
- Hiten was the first spacecraft to demonstrate a low energy trajectory, passing by L_{4} and L_{5} to achieve lunar orbit at a very low fuel expense, compared to usual orbital techniques. Hiten did not find any conclusive increase in dust density at Lagrange points.

==== Proposed objects ====
- TDRS-style communication satellites to support L_{2} satellite and further regions on the Moon.
- Exploration Gateway Platform
- In his 1976 book The High Frontier: Human Colonies in Space Dr. Gerard O'Neill proposed the establishment of gigantic Space Islands in L_{5}. The inhabitants of the L5 Society should convert lunar material to huge solar power satellites. Many works of fiction, most notably the Gundam series, involve colonies at these locations.

== Sun–Venus Lagrange points ==
=== L4 ===
- 2013 ND15

== Sun–Mars Lagrange points ==
=== Sun–Mars L1 ===
==== Proposed objects ====
- In a 2017 NASA workshop, former NASA Chief Scientist Jim Green proposed the placement of a magnetic dipole located at the Mars Lagrange orbit L_{1} at about 320 R_{♂}, creating a partial and distant artificial magnetosphere. If constructed, the shield may allow the planet to partially restore its atmosphere and potentially enabling the terraforming of Mars.

=== Sun–Mars L4 and L5 ===
Asteroids in the L_{4} and L_{5} Sun–Mars Lagrangian points are sometimes called Mars trojans, with a lower-case t, as "Trojan asteroid" was originally defined as a term for Lagrangian asteroids of Jupiter. They may also be called Mars Lagrangian asteroids.

==== L4 ====
- (121514) 1999 UJ7

==== L5 ====
- 5261 Eureka
- (101429) 1998 VF31
- (311999) 2007 NS2
- (385250) 2001 DH47, 2001 FG24, (461377) 2001 FR127 (not confirmed as true Lagrangian asteroids)

Source: Minor Planet Center

== Sun–Ceres Lagrange points ==
- 1372 Haremari
- (76146) 2000 EU16
- (185105) 2006 SV23

== Sun–Jupiter Lagrange points ==
Asteroids in the L_{4} and L_{5} Sun–Jupiter Lagrangian points are known as Jupiter Trojan asteroids or simply Trojan asteroids.

=== L4 ===
- Trojan asteroids, Greek camp

=== L5 ===
- Trojan asteroids, Trojan camp

=== L4 and L5 ===
- Lucy (spacecraft), L4 in 2027, L5 in 2033

== Saturn–Tethys Lagrange points ==
=== L4 ===
- Telesto

=== L5 ===
- Calypso

== Saturn–Dione Lagrange points ==
=== L4 ===
- Helene

=== L5 ===
- Polydeuces, follows a "tadpole" orbit around L_{5}

== Sun–Uranus Lagrange points ==
=== L3 ===
- 83982 Crantor, follows a horseshoe orbit around L_{3}

=== L4 ===
- (687170) 2011 QF99
- (636872) 2014 YX49

== Sun–Neptune Lagrange points ==
Minor planets in the L_{4} and L_{5} Sun–Neptune Lagrangian points are called Neptune trojans, with a lower-case t, as "Trojan asteroid" was originally defined as a term for Lagrangian asteroids of Jupiter.

Data from: Minor Planet Center

=== L4 ===
- 385571 Otrera
- 385695 Clete
- (612243) 2001 QR322
- 2005 TN53
- (613490) 2006 RJ103
- (527604) 2007 VL305

=== L5 ===
- 2008 LC18
- 2004 KV18
- 2011 HM102

== Tables of missions ==
Color key:
Unflown or planned mission Mission en route or in progress (including mission extensions) Mission at Lagrangian point completed successfully (or partially successfully)

Lagrangian point missions
Mission	Lagrangian point	Agency	Description
International Sun–Earth Explorer 3 (ISEE-3)	Sun–Earth L_{1}	NASA	Launched in 1978, it was the first spacecraft to be put into orbit around a libration point, where it operated for four years in a halo orbit about the L_{1} Sun–Earth point. After the original mission ended, it was commanded to leave L_{1} in September 1982 in order to investigate comets and the Sun. Now in a heliocentric orbit, an unsuccessful attempt to return to halo orbit was made in 2014 when it made a flyby of the Earth–Moon system.
Advanced Composition Explorer (ACE)	Sun–Earth L_{1}	NASA	Launched 1997. Has fuel to orbit near L_{1} until 2024. Operational as of 2019.
Deep Space Climate Observatory (DSCOVR)	Sun–Earth L_{1}	NASA	Launched on 11 February 2015. Planned successor of the Advanced Composition Explorer (ACE) satellite.
LISA Pathfinder (LPF)	Sun–Earth L_{1}	ESA, NASA	Launched one day behind revised schedule (planned for the 100th anniversary of the publication of Einstein's General Theory of Relativity), on 3 December 2015. Arrived at L_{1} on 22 January 2016. LISA Pathfinder was deactivated on 30 June 2017.
Solar and Heliospheric Observatory (SOHO)	Sun–Earth L_{1}	ESA, NASA	Orbiting near L_{1} since 1996. Operational as of 2020.
WIND	Sun–Earth L_{1}	NASA	Arrived at L_{1} in 2004 with fuel for 60 years. Operational as of 2019.
Wilkinson Microwave Anisotropy Probe (WMAP)	Sun–Earth L_{2}	NASA	Arrived at L_{2} in 2001. Mission ended 2010, then sent to solar orbit outside L_{2}.
Herschel Space Telescope	Sun–Earth L_{2}	ESA	Arrived at L_{2} July 2009. Ceased operation on 29 April 2013; will be moved to a heliocentric orbit.
Planck Space Observatory	Sun–Earth L_{2}	ESA	Arrived at L_{2} July 2009. Mission ended on 23 October 2013; Planck has been moved to a heliocentric parking orbit.
Chang'e 2	Sun–Earth L_{2}	CNSA	Arrived in August 2011 after completing a lunar mission before departing en route to asteroid 4179 Toutatis in April 2012.
ARTEMIS mission extension of THEMIS	Earth–Moon L_{1} and L_{2}	NASA	Mission consists of two spacecraft, which were the first spacecraft to reach Earth–Moon Lagrangian points. Both moved through Earth–Moon Lagrangian points, and are now in lunar orbit.
WIND	Sun–Earth L_{2}	NASA	Arrived at L_{2} in November 2003 and departed April 2004.
Gaia Space Observatory	Sun–Earth L_{2}	ESA	Launched 19 December 2013. Operational as of 2020.
Chang'e 5-T1 Service Module	Earth–Moon L_{2}	CNSA	Launched on 23 October 2014, arrived at L_{2} halo orbit on 13 January 2015.
Queqiao	Earth–Moon L_{2}	CNSA	Launched on 21 May 2018, arrived at L_{2} halo orbit on June 14 for Chang'e 4 mission. Queqiao is the first ever communication relay and radio astronomy satellite at operating its location.
Spektr-RG	Sun–Earth L_{2}	IKI RAN; DLR	Launched 13 July 2019. Roentgen and Gamma space observatory. Operational as of June 2020.
Chang'e 5 Service Module	Sun–Earth L_{1}	CNSA	Launched on 23 November 2020, arrived at L_{1} halo orbit on 15 March 2021.
James Webb Space Telescope (JWST)	Sun–Earth L_{2}	NASA, ESA, CSA	Launched on 25 December 2021, arrived at L_{2} point on 24 January 2022. Operational as of 2022.
Euclid	Sun–Earth L_{2}	ESA, NASA	Launched on 1 July 2023, arrived at L_{2} point on 28 July 2023. Currently in testing phase as of September 2023.
Aditya-L1	Sun–Earth L_{1}	ISRO	Launched on 2 September 2023 and was successfully inserted into an orbit about Sun-Earth L_{1} point on 6 January 2024.
Chang'e 6 Service Module	Sun–Earth L_{2}	CNSA	Launched on 3 May 2024, arrived at L_{2} halo orbit on 9 September 2024.
Interstellar Mapping and Acceleration Probe (IMAP)	Sun–Earth L_{1}	NASA	Launched on 24 September 2025.
Space Weather Follow On - Lagrange 1 (SWFO-L1)	Sun–Earth L_{1}	NOAA	Launched on 24 September 2025 as a rideshare to IMAP.
Carruthers Geocorona Observatory	Sun–Earth L_{1}	NASA	Launched on 24 September 2025 as a rideshare to IMAP.
Nancy Grace Roman Space Telescope (NGRST)	Sun–Earth L_{2}	NASA	Launched on 30 August 2026, currently en route.

=== Future and proposed missions ===
Future and proposed missions to Lagrangian points
Mission	Lagrangian point	Agency	Description
"Lunar Far-Side Communication Satellites"	Earth–Moon L_{2}	NASA	Proposed in 1968 for communications on the far side of the Moon during the Apollo program, mainly to enable an Apollo landing on the far side—neither the satellites nor the landing were ever realized.
Space colonization and manufacturing	Earth–Moon L_{4} or L_{5}	—	First proposed in 1974 by Gerard K. O'Neill and subsequently advocated by the L5 Society.
DESTINY+	Earth–Moon L_{2}	JAXA	Deep-space technology demonstrator and asteroid flyby mission; launch targeted for fiscal year 2028 aboard an H3 rocket.
Exploration Gateway Platform	Earth–Moon L_{2}	NASA	Proposed in 2011.
LiteBIRD	Sun–Earth L_{2}	JAXA, NASA	JAXA's next "Strategic Large Mission"; launch planned for 2032.
Planetary Transits and Oscillations of stars (PLATO)	Sun–Earth L_{2}	ESA	Planned for launch in 2026 for an initial six-year mission.
Space Infrared Telescope for Cosmology and Astrophysics (SPICA)	Sun–Earth L_{2}	JAXA, ESA, SRON	As of 2015, awaiting approval from both Japanese and European side, launch proposed for 2032.
Advanced Telescope for High Energy Astrophysics (ATHENA)	Sun–Earth L_{2}	ESA	Launch planned for 2035.
ESA Vigil	Sun–Earth L_{5}	ESA	Observatory for early warning of increased solar activity. Launch planned for 2029.
Sun Chaser	Sun–Earth L_{4}	—	Observatory for early warning of solar particle events. Early proposal phase.
Spektr-M	Sun–Earth L_{2}	Roscosmos	Possible launch after 2030.

== See also ==
- Trojan (celestial body)
- Co-orbital configuration
