= (316179) 2010 EN65 =

Jumping Neptune trojan

(316179) 2010 EN_{65}
- 2010 EN_{65} is jumping from L_{4} to L_{5} via L_{3}.

Discovery
- Discovered by: D. L. Rabinowitz; S. W. Tourtellotte
- Discovery site: La Silla Obs.
- Discovery date: 7 March 2010

Designations
- Minor planet category: TNO · Neptune trojan distant

Orbital characteristics
- Epoch 23 March 2018 (JD 2458200.5)
- Uncertainty parameter 2
- Observation arc: 25.45 yr (9,296 days)
- Aphelion: 40.367 AU
- Perihelion: 21.148 AU
- Semi-major axis: 30.758 AU
- Eccentricity: 0.3124
- Orbital period (sidereal): 170.58 yr (62,306 days)
- Mean anomaly: 48.107°
- Mean motion: 0° 0^{m} 20.88^{s} / day
- Inclination: 19.209°
- Longitude of ascending node: 234.47°
- Argument of perihelion: 225.77°

Physical characteristics
- Mean diameter: 176 km (est. at 0.08)
- Absolute magnitude (H): 7.17

(316179) 2010 EN_{65} is a trans-Neptunian object orbiting the Sun. However, with a semi-major axis of 30.8 AU, the object is actually a jumping Neptune trojan, co-orbital with Neptune, as the giant planet has a similar semi-major axis of 30.1 AU. The body is jumping from the Lagrangian point L_{4} into L_{5} via L_{3}. As of 2016, it is 54 AU from Neptune. By 2070, it will be 69 AU from Neptune.

== Discovery ==
2010 EN_{65} was discovered on 7 March 2010, by David L. Rabinowitz and Suzanne W. Tourtellotte using the 1.3-meter Small and Medium Research Telescope System (SMARTS) at Cerro Tololo Observatory in Chile.

== Orbit ==
2010 EN_{65} follows a rather eccentric orbit (0.31) with a semi-major axis of 30.72 AU and an inclination of 19.3º. Its orbit is well determined with images dating back to 1989.

Animation of 2010 EN_{65} relative to Sun and Neptune 1600–2398 2010 EN_{65} · Neptune · Sun

== Physical properties ==
2010 EN_{65} is a quite large minor body with an absolute magnitude of 7.17 and an estimated diameter of 176 kilometers (109 miles) based on an assumed albedo of 0.08.

== Jumping trojan ==
2010 EN_{65} is another co-orbital of Neptune, the second brightest after the quasi-satellite (309239) 2007 RW10. 2010 EN_{65} is currently transitioning from librating around Lagrangian point L_{4} to librating around L_{5}. This unusual trojan-like behavior is termed "jumping trojan".

== Numbering and naming ==
This minor planet was numbered by the Minor Planet Center on 7 February 2012 (M.P.C. 78220). As of 2025, it has not been named. If named, it will follow the naming scheme already established with 385571 Otrera and 385695 Clete, which is to name these objects after figures related to the Amazons, an all-female warrior tribe that fought in the Trojan War on the side of the Trojans against the Greek.
