= (527604) 2007 VL305 =

Neptune trojan

(527604) 2007 VL_{305}
Discovery
- Discovered by: A. C. Becker; A. W. Puckett; J. Kubica
- Discovery site: Apache Point Obs.
- Discovery date: 4 November 2007

Designations
- Minor planet category: Neptune trojan · L_{4} centaur · distant

Orbital characteristics
- Epoch 4 September 2017 (JD 2458000.5)
- Uncertainty parameter 4
- Observation arc: 5.19 yr (1,894 days)
- Aphelion: 31.729 AU
- Perihelion: 28.122 AU
- Semi-major axis: 29.926 AU
- Eccentricity: 0.0603
- Orbital period (sidereal): 163.71 yr (59,795 days)
- Mean anomaly: 10.760°
- Mean motion: 0° 0^{m} 21.6^{s} / day
- Inclination: 28.155°
- Longitude of ascending node: 188.69°
- Argument of perihelion: 216.70°

Physical characteristics
- Mean diameter: 110 km (est. at 0.10); 160 km
- Apparent magnitude: 22.2
- Absolute magnitude (H): 7.9

(527604) 2007 VL_{305} is an inclined Neptune trojan that shares Neptune's orbit in the L_{4} Lagrangian point. It was discovered on 4 November 2007, by astronomers Andrew Becker, Andrew Puckett and Jeremy Kubica at the Apache Point Observatory in New Mexico, United States, although images from 2005 have also been recovered. It measures approximately 160 kilometers in diameter and was the sixth Neptune trojan to be discovered. As of 2016, it is 34.1 AU from Neptune.

== Orbit and classification ==
Neptune trojans can be considered resonant trans-Neptunian objects in a 1:1 mean-motion orbital resonance with Neptune. These trojans have a semi-major axis and an orbital period very similar to Neptune's (30.10 AU; 164.8 years).

2007 VL_{305} belongs to the leading L_{4} group, which orbits 60° ahead of Neptune's orbit. It orbits the Sun with a semi-major axis of 29.926 AU at a distance of 28.1–31.7 AU once every 163 years and 9 months (59,795 days). Its orbit has an eccentricity of 0.06 and an inclination of 28° with respect to the ecliptic. Its inclination is almost as high as that of 2011 HM102.

== Physical characteristics ==
=== Diameter ===
The discoverers estimate that 2007 VL_{305} has a mean diameter of 160 kilometers based on a magnitude of 22.2. Based on a generic magnitude-to-diameter conversion, it measures approximately 110 kilometers in diameter using an absolute magnitude of 7.9 with an assumed albedo of 0.10.

== Numbering and naming ==
This minor planet was numbered by the Minor Planet Center on 18 May 2019 (M.P.C. 114650). As of 2025, it has not been named. If named, it will follow the naming scheme already established with 385571 Otrera and 385695 Clete, which is to name these objects after figures related to the Amazons, an all-female warrior tribe that fought in the Trojan War on the side of the Trojans against the Greek.
