= (309239) 2007 RW10 =

Minor planet and quasi-satellite of Neptune

(309239) 2007 RW_{10}
Discovery
- Discovered by: PDSSS
- Discovery date: 9 September 2007

Designations
- Minor planet category: TNO · Nept. co-orbital centaur · distant

Orbital characteristics
- Epoch 23 March 2018 (JD 2458200.5)
- Uncertainty parameter 2
- Observation arc: 10693 days (29.28 yr)
- Aphelion: 39.28320 AU (5.876683 Tm)
- Perihelion: 21.06436 AU (3.151183 Tm)
- Semi-major axis: 30.17878 AU (4.514681 Tm)
- Eccentricity: 0.30201
- Orbital period (sidereal): 165.79 yr (60555.1 d)
- Mean anomaly: 71.52911°
- Mean motion: 0° 0^{m} 21.402^{s} / day
- Inclination: 36.15744°
- Longitude of ascending node: 187.06355°
- Argument of perihelion: 95.64947°
- Known satellites: 0
- Earth MOID: 20.2499 AU (3.02934 Tm)
- Jupiter MOID: 17.1323 AU (2.56296 Tm)
- T_{Jupiter}: 3.880

Physical characteristics
- Dimensions: 247±30 km
- Geometric albedo: 0.083+0.068 −0.039
- Spectral type: Prominent water (H_{2}O/"bowl" type)
- Absolute magnitude (H): 6.6

(309239) 2007 RW_{10} is a temporary quasi-satellite of Neptune. Observed from Neptune, it would appear to revolve around it over one Neptunian year but in reality, it orbits the Sun, not Neptune.

== Discovery, orbit and physical properties ==
2007 RW_{10} was discovered by the Palomar Distant Solar System Survey on September 9, 2007, with precovery images from 1988 (also taken at Palomar). At the time of discovery, this minor body was believed to be a Neptune trojan, but it is no longer listed as such. The Jet Propulsion Laboratory classifies 2007 RW_{10} as trans-Neptunian object but the Minor Planet Center includes the object among centaurs. It moves in an orbit with an inclination of 36.2°, a semi-major axis of 30.18 AU, and an eccentricity of 0.3020. Herschel-PACS observations indicate that it has a diameter of 247 km.

== Quasi-satellite dynamical state and orbital evolution ==
2007 RW_{10} is currently following a quasi-satellite loop around Neptune. It has been a quasi-satellite of Neptune for about 12,500 years and it will remain in that dynamical state for around another 12,500 years. Prior to the quasi-satellite dynamical state, 2007 RW_{10} was an L_{5} trojan and it will return to this state soon after leaving its current quasi-satellite orbit. Its orbital inclination is the largest among known Neptune co-orbitals. It is also possibly the largest known object trapped in the 1:1 mean-motion resonance with any major planet.

== Origin ==
2007 RW_{10} is a dynamically hot (both high eccentricity and inclination) object that is unlikely to be a primordial Neptune co-orbital. It probably originated well beyond Neptune and was later temporarily captured in the 1:1 resonance with Neptune.

== See also ==
- (613100) 2005 TN74, which was also suspected of being a Neptune trojan at the time of discovery
