= 2008 LC18 =

Neptune trojan

2008 LC_{18}
Discovery
- Discovered by: S. S. Sheppard; C. Trujillo
- Discovery site: Mauna Kea Obs.
- Discovery date: 7 June 2008

Designations
- Minor planet category: Neptune trojan; L_{5}; centaur; distant

Orbital characteristics
- Epoch 21 November 2025 (JD 2461000.5)
- Uncertainty parameter 4
- Observation arc: 15.75 yr (5,753 days)
- Aphelion: 32.448 AU
- Perihelion: 27.326 AU
- Semi-major axis: 29.887 AU
- Eccentricity: 0.0857
- Orbital period (sidereal): 163.39 yr (59,679 days)
- Mean anomaly: 204.47°
- Mean motion: 0° 0^{m} 21.6^{s} / day
- Inclination: 27.595°
- Longitude of ascending node: 88.581°
- Argument of perihelion: 5.8080°

Physical characteristics
- Dimensions: 98 km (est. at 0.10); 100 km
- Apparent magnitude: 23.2
- Absolute magnitude (H): 8.21

2008 LC_{18} is a Neptune trojan first observed on 7 June 2008 by American astronomers Scott Sheppard and Chad Trujillo using the Subaru Telescope at Mauna Kea Observatories on Hawaii, United States. It was the first object found in Neptune's trailing L_{5} Lagrangian point and measures approximately 100 kilometers in diameter.

== Orbit and classification ==
Neptune trojans are resonant trans-Neptunian objects in a 1:1 mean-motion orbital resonance with Neptune. These trojans have a semi-major axis and an orbital period very similar to Neptune's (30.10 AU; 164.8 years).

2008 LC_{18} belongs to the trailing L_{5} group, which follow 60° behind Neptune's orbit. It orbits the Sun with a semi-major axis of 29.887 AU at a distance of 27.3–32.4 AU once every 163 years and 5 months (59,679 days). Its orbit has an eccentricity of 0.09 and an inclination of 27.6° with respect to the ecliptic. This object has the second highest inclination of any known Neptune trojan after 2011 HM102, which has 29.3°.

== Search for Neptune trojans ==
The search for L_{5} trojans of Neptune has been impeded by the fact that this region of space is currently along the line of sight to the center of the Milky Way, an area of the sky crowded with stars. 2008 LC_{18} was found in a location where background stars are obscured by a dust cloud. The discovery of one Neptune L_{5} trojan in a searched area of 19 square degrees suggests that there may be 150 Neptune L_{5} trojans with a diameter greater than ~80 km (24th magnitude), similar to the estimate of such objects in Neptune's L_{4} swarm.

== New Horizons probe ==
2008 LC_{18} was not close enough for investigation by the New Horizons spacecraft when it crossed Neptune's L_{5} region en route to Pluto in 2013–2014, but its discovery showed that other, more accessible Neptune trojans could potentially have been found before that time. 2008 LC_{18} was 2 AU from Pluto in 1997. 2008 LC_{18} crossed the ecliptic plane in 2011. As of 2016, it is 33 AU from Neptune.

== Physical characteristics ==
The discoverers estimate that the body has a mean-diameter of 100 kilometers based on a magnitude of 23.2. Based on a generic magnitude-to-diameter conversion, it measures approximately 98 kilometers in diameter using an absolute magnitude of 8.2 with an assumed albedo of 0.10.

== Numbering and naming ==
Due to its orbital uncertainty, this minor planet has not been numbered and its official discoverers have not been determined. If named, it will follow the naming scheme already established with 385571 Otrera, which is to name these objects after figures related to the Amazons, an all-female warrior tribe that fought in the Trojan War on the side of the Trojans against the Greek.
