= Vigil (space mission) =

European Space Agency space weather mission

- Names: Formerly known as Lagrange
- Mission type: Space Weather nowcast, forecast
- Operator: European Space Agency
- COSPAR ID: TBD
- SATCAT no.: TBD
- Website: https://www.esa.int/Space_Safety/Vigil
- Mission duration: Cruise phase: 3 years Operations: 4.5 years Extension: 5 years Designed operational life span: 20+ years

Spacecraft properties
- Launch mass: 2,500 kg (limit)
- Dry mass: ~1,100 kg
- Payload mass: ~150 kg (before system margins)
- Power: Spacecraft ~1000 W; Payload ~200 W

Start of mission
- Launch date: Q3 2031 (planned)
- Rocket: Ariane 62
- Launch site: Guiana Space Centre
- Contractor: Arianespace

Orbital parameters
- Reference system: Sun-Earth L_{5}
- Regime: Lissajous orbit
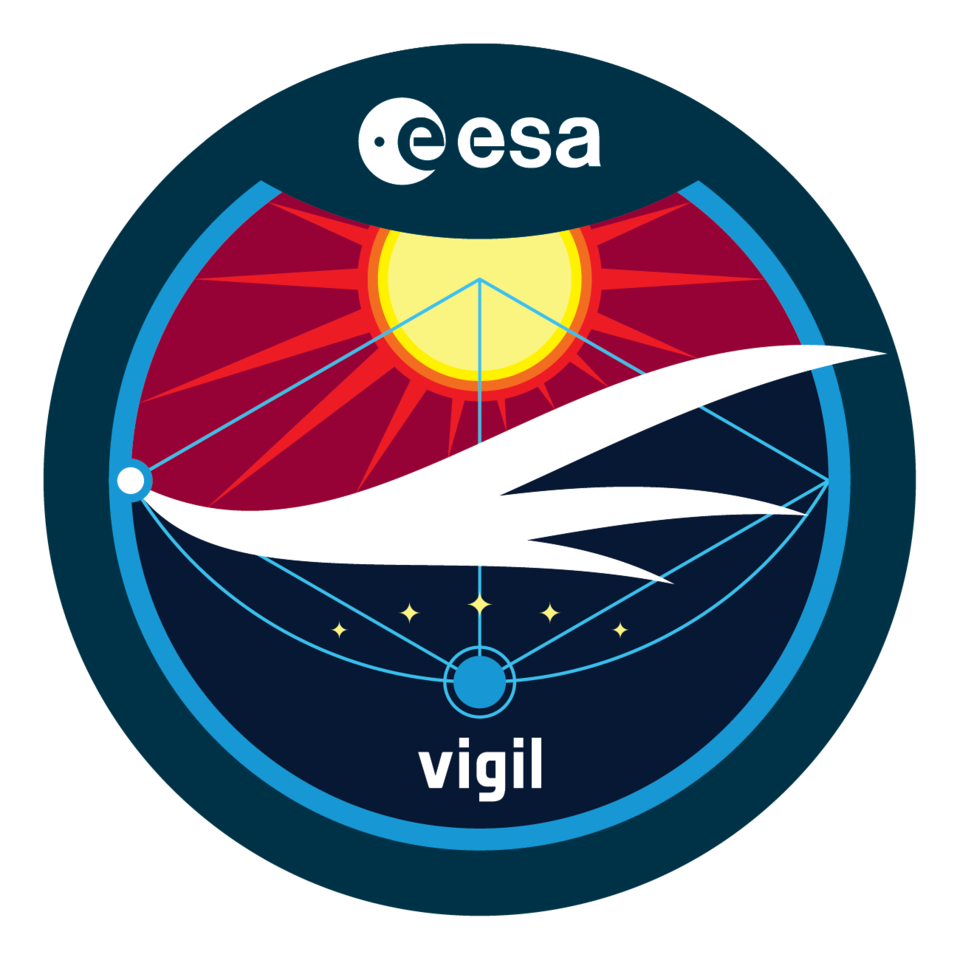
- ESA insignia Space Safety Programme

Vigil, formerly known as Lagrange, is a future space weather mission under development by the European Space Agency (ESA). The mission will provide the ESA Space Weather Office with instruments able to monitor the Sun, its solar corona, and interplanetary medium between the Sun and Earth, to provide early warnings of increased solar activity, to identify and mitigate potential threats to society and infrastructure, as well as to allow 4 to 5 days space weather forecasts. To this purpose the Vigil mission will place for the first time a spacecraft at Sun-Earth Lagrange point 5 (L_{5}) from where it would get a 'side' view of the Sun, observing regions of solar activity on the solar surface before they turn and face Earth.

== Objectives ==
Monitoring space weather includes events such as solar flares, coronal mass ejections, geomagnetic storms, solar proton events, etc. The Sun-Earth L_{5} location provides opportunities for space weather forecasting by monitoring the Sun beyond the Eastern solar limb not visible from Earth, thus increasing the forecast lead time of potentially hazardous solar phenomena including solar flares, fast solar wind streams.

The Vigil mission will improve the assessment of Coronal Mass Ejection (CME) motion and density, speed/energy, arrival time and impact on Earth to support protection of the critical infrastructure on ground and in space. The mission will also perform in-situ observations of the solar wind bulk velocity, density, and temperature as well as the Interplanetary magnetic field (IMF) at L_{5}, to provide enhanced detection and forecasting of high-speed solar wind streams and corotating interaction regions.

Vigil mission objectives can be grouped in two main categories:

- Nowcasting with the aim to provide an early warning about solar flares and the onset of a Coronal Mass Ejections (CMEs). Thanks to the side view from SEL5, the Vigil mission will also be able improve the accuracy of the predicted arrival CME arrival time on Earth by 2 to 4 hours compared to the current capabilities; this will be achieved by monitoring the entire space between Sun and Earth allowing mid-course tracking of CME and in general solar wind features as they travel towards Earth.
- Forecasting up to 4 to 5 days of the developing solar activity thanks to the monitoring of active region development beyond the East limb no visible from Earth. In-situ measurements in Sun-Earth L_{5} will allow monitoring of high-speed solar wind streams and magnetic field several days in advance before they reach the Earth.

== Project history ==
As part of the Space Situational Awareness Programme (SSA), ESA initiated in 2015 the assessment of two missions to enhance space weather monitoring. These missions were initially meant to utilize the positioning of satellites at the Sun-Earth Lagrangian L_{1} and L_{5} points. Eventually, in the frame of the cooperation on space-based space weather observations between the European Space Agency (ESA) and the United States National Oceanic and Atmospheric Administration (NOAA) National Environmental Satellite Data and Information Service (NESDIS) the following was agreed:

- NOAA/NESDIS will launch a Space Weather Follow On (SWFO) Mission to Lagrange Point L_{1} for continuity of operational space weather observations and to reduce the risk of a measurement gap in the current coronal mass ejection (CME) imagery and in-situ solar wind measurements.
- ESA will launch a mission to Lagrange Point L_{5} to provide capability for solar and space environment monitoring away from the Sun-Earth line.

In the scope of this agreement the two agencies will share data and provide each other with instruments to be embarked on the respective platforms.

Then a new opportunity arose: ISRO had plans to start a new solar observatory in low earth orbit. ESA convinced ISRO to expand the mission to a larger satellite bus, more instruments, and operate it at Lagrange Point L_{1}. The Indian Space agency hesitated because it never had operated a spacecraft at L_{1} before. ESA supported the necessary software upgrade with trajectories of real ESA spacecraft. The Indian spacecraft operating system showed very similar results and was then certified to operate spacecraft at the Lagrange Points. In exchange for sharing data, ESA provides ESTRACK service for Aditya-L1, which started in 2023.

The space segment of the Vigil mission completed the first part of Preliminary Definition (Phase B1) in June 2022. On 21 November 2022, ESA issued a Request for Quotation to Airbus Defence and Space Ltd. for the design, development and verification (Phase B2, C and D) of the Vigil Space Segment. The Phase B2 activities started in April 2024, with the Preliminary Design Review planned for Q1 2026 and the Critical Design Review in Q1 2028.

In October 2025, ESA and the South Korean KASA signed a joint statement of intent about potential future sharing of data from Vigil and the KASA's upcoming solar probe mission to the Sun-Earth Lagrange point L4.

ESOC in Darmstadt will be Missions Operation Centre. The development of the Ground Segment, including the Mission Operation Centre and Payload Data Centre, will start in 2027 (TBC), although a series of preparatory activities are currently on going.

== Mission timeline ==
Vigil is scheduled to be launched in 2031, followed by 3 years of cruise to L_{5}. The mission aims to start quasi-nominal operation as soon as the spacecraft has reached the mid course point on its way to L_{5} (30deg separation from Earth with respect to Sun). Nominally from L_{5} for 4.5 years, with a possibility of extension up to 5 additional years. The robust design is for a lifespan of more than 20 year. The orbit around L5 is stable and can be maintained for decades with no or very little fuel consumption. The expectation is that it can get a similar lifespan as SOHO.

== Trajectory ==
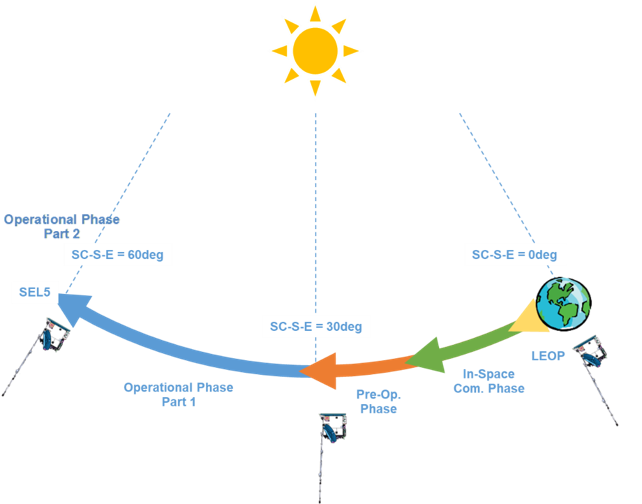
Vigil mission phases

The launcher service is baselined as Ariane 62 by Arianespace from the Guiana Space Centre. The launcher will be in dual-launch configuration for injection in GTO. The spacecraft will be launched as secondary passenger with a commercial customer bound for geostationary orbit in a dual-launch with Ariane 6.4. This transfer option makes use of the Sun-Earth L_{1}/L_{2} connection and the Weak Stability Boundary effects near L_{2} to reach L_{5}.

After release of the spacecraft into GTO, it will perform a series of 3 Apogee Raising Manoeuvres (ARM) to make its way towards L_{1} within a period of 14 days, planned to minimise the transitions through the Van Allen belts. From L_{1} the spacecraft will be placed on a zero to low-cost transfer trajectory towards L_{2} from which it will then leave towards L_{5}. Deep Space Manoeuvres (DSM), preceded and followed by correction manoeuvres, will be executed as needed.

When the spacecraft reaches L_{5}, a braking manoeuvre to insert the spacecraft into the final orbit will be executed. Different options are investigated, resulting in a split of such manoeuvre in two burns. The cruise to L_{5} can take up to 3 years. To increase the use of the Vigil spacecraft, the mission will enter in a pre-operational phase once the halfway through the journey L_{5}.

Alternatives include the use of Ariane 62 for direct injection in L_{5}, Ariane 64 or Falcon 9 provided by SpaceX.

== Spacecraft platform ==
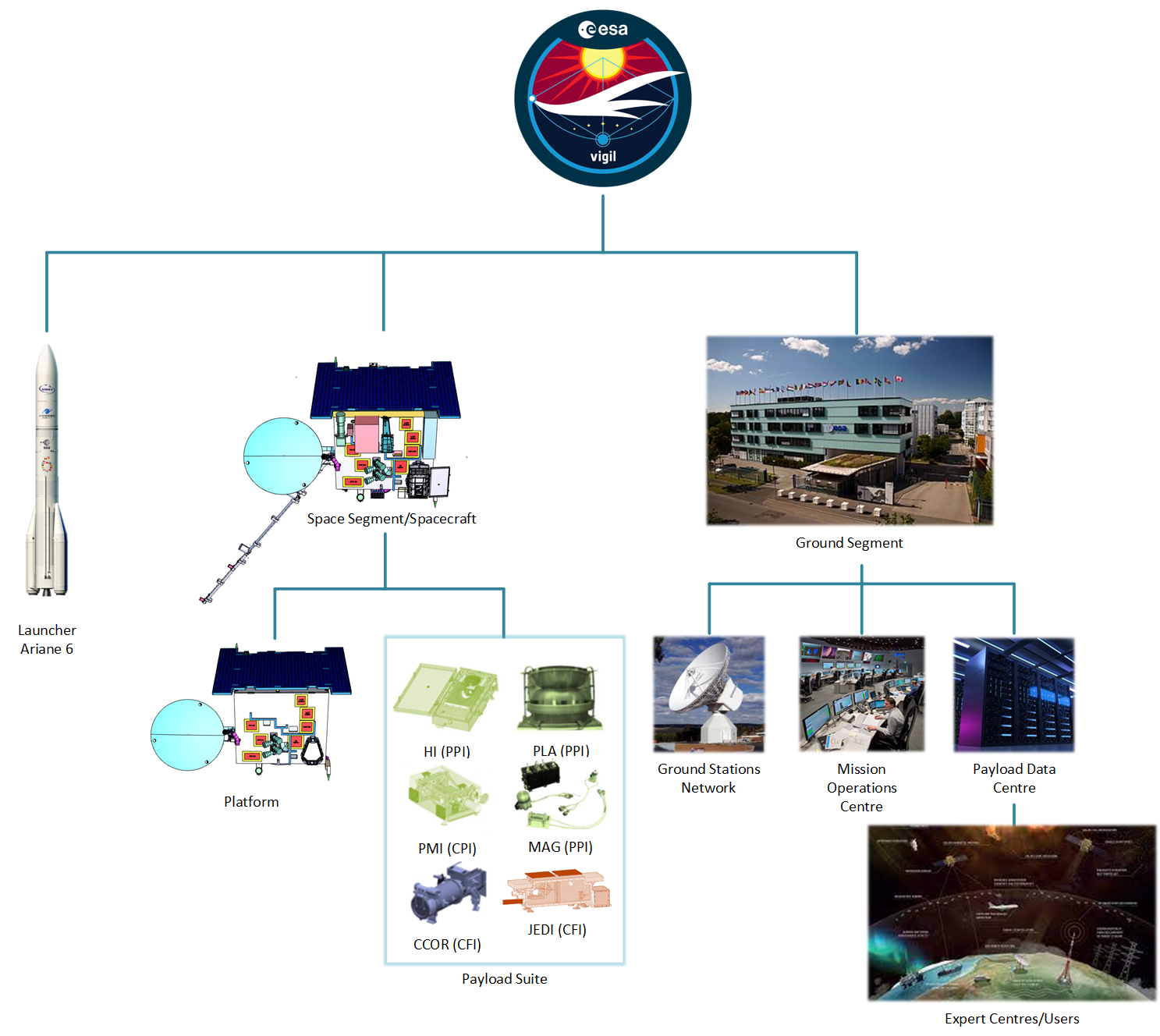
Vigil mission architecture (2025)

The Platform provides the service functions required to support operation and data collection of the Vigil Payload Suite. The spacecraft concept includes a robust avionics architecture designed to remain operational during severe space weather conditions. The Failure Detection Isolation and Recover (FDIR) system is intended to increase onboard autonomy of the spacecraft and reduce reliance on ground intervention.

The Mission Data downlink is via X-band at an average data rate of ~1 Mbit/s (about 86 gigabits per day) with 24/7 coverage provided by ESTRACK supplemented by additional commercial stations.

The mass at launch is projected close to 2500 kg. To reach SEL5 the proposed design will rely on a bi-propellant Chemical Propulsion System equipped with a 450 N main engine.

== Instruments ==
The payload suite will include: 3 remote sensing instruments and 2 in-situ instruments. In the frame of the inter-agency cooperation between ESA and NASA, Vigil will offer the possibility to accommodate an additional NASA instrument of opportunity (NIO).

=== Remote sensing instruments ===
The remote sensing instruments will allow to estimate size, mass, speed, and direction of CMEs.

- Compact Coronagraph (CCOR) will image the solar corona and be used to observe Coronal Mass Ejections (CMEs). With CCOR data the size, mass, speed, and direction of CMEs can be derived. The CCOR Instrument will be provided to ESA by NOAA and manufactured by U.S. Naval Research Laboratory (NRL). The design will instrument is based on the heritage of a similar instrument for NOAA's mission SWFO-1 and GOES-U.
- Heliospheric Imager (HI) will provide wide-angle, white-light images of the region of space between the Sun and the Earth (i.e., the heliosphere). These images are required to enable tracking of Earth-directed CMEs over their propagation path once they have left the field-of-view of the coronagraph instrument.
- Photospheric Magnetic field Imager (PMI) will scan a selected solar spectrum to generate 3D maps of the magnetic field (field strength, azimuth, inclination) and crucial physical parameters (e.g. distribution of vertical and horizontal magnetic fields, distribution of inclination angles, twist, writhe, helicity, current density, share angles, photospheric magnetic excess energy etc.) for enhanced space weather applications. The instrument will also generate solar white light images as by-products of magnetograph measurements and produced as continuum images observed at an additional wavelength point in the vicinity of the magnetically sensitive spectral line.

=== In-situ instruments ===
In-situ instruments can be used to monitor the Stream Interaction Regions (SIR) and Co-rotating Interaction Regions (CIR) up to 4–5 days in advance before their arrival at Earth.

- Plasma Analyser (PLA) will measure Solar wind bulk velocity, solar wind bulk density and solar wind temperature, are required for monitoring of the solar wind that is turning towards the Earth and particularly for detection of high-speed solar wind streams that produce Stream Interaction Regions (SIR) and Co-rotating Interaction Regions (CIR).
- Magnetometer (MAG) will measurement of the Interplanetary Magnetic Field (IMF) at L_{5}; to minimise the effects of the electromagnetic interferences generated by the Vigil spacecraft itself, the MAG will be placed at the end of a 7m boom.

=== NASA Instrument of Opportunity ===
The Joint EUV coronal Diagnostic Investigation (JEDI) instrument, will be provided by NASA to be hosted on the Vigil spacecraft. The JEDI scientific objectives can complement those of the Vigil mission, but it is not considered essential for its success.

== Ground Segment ==
The Ground Segment, consists of:

- Mission Operation Centre (MOC) located in European Space Operations Centre (ESOC) responsible for Satellite commanding, Satellite health monitoring, orbit control and on-board software configuration and maintenance.
- The Payload Data Centre (PDC) responsible for mission data acquisition, processing, archiving and distribution to the customer/users, as well as mission planning;
- Ground Station Network (GSN). The GSN will be made up of a mix of ESA ESTRACK stations and commercial stations as Vigil has a specific need to maintain a 24/7 downlink capability, including over the Pacific Ocean where there is a gap in ESTRACK coverage, third party stations will be required.

== See also ==
- Lagrange-V Solar Observatory (LAVSO) (zh:羲和二号) − China's L5 solar observatory
- List of European Space Agency programmes and missions
- List of heliophysics missions
- List of objects at Lagrange points
