= (613490) 2006 RJ103 =

Neptune trojan

(613490) 2006 RJ_{103}
Discovery
- Discovered by: Sloan Digital Sky Srvy.
- Discovery site: Apache Point Obs.
- Discovery date: 12 September 2006

Designations
- Minor planet category: Neptune trojan; L_{4}; centaur; distant

Orbital characteristics
- Epoch 4 September 2017 (JD 2458000.5)
- Uncertainty parameter 3
- Observation arc: 14.15 yr (5,169 days)
- Aphelion: 30.862 AU
- Perihelion: 28.988 AU
- Semi-major axis: 29.925 AU
- Eccentricity: 0.0313
- Orbital period (sidereal): 163.70 yr (59,793 days)
- Mean anomaly: 251.55°
- Mean motion: 0° 0^{m} 21.6^{s} / day
- Inclination: 8.1641°
- Longitude of ascending node: 120.86°
- Argument of perihelion: 33.563°

Physical characteristics
- Dimensions: 130 km (est. at 0.10); 180 km
- Apparent magnitude: 22.0
- Absolute magnitude (H): 7.5

(613490) 2006 RJ_{103} is a Neptune trojan, first observed by the Sloan Digital Sky Survey Collaboration at Apache Point Observatory, New Mexico, on 12 September 2006. It was the fifth and largest such body discovered, approximately 180 kilometers in diameter. As of 2016, it is 30.3 AU from Neptune.

== Orbit and classification ==
Neptune trojans are resonant trans-Neptunian objects in a 1:1 mean-motion orbital resonance with Neptune. These trojans have a semi-major axis and an orbital period very similar to Neptune's (30.10 AU; 164.8 years).

2006 RJ_{103} belongs to the leading L_{4} group, which follow 60° ahead Neptune's orbit. It orbits the Sun with a semi-major axis 29.925 AU of at a distance of 29.0–30.9 AU once every 163 years and 8 months (59,793 days). Its orbit has an eccentricity of 0.03 and an inclination of 8° with respect to the ecliptic.

== Physical characteristics ==
The discoverers estimate that 2006 RJ_{103} has a mean-diameter of 180 kilometers based on a magnitude of 22.0. Based on a generic magnitude-to-diameter conversion, it measures approximately 130 kilometers in diameter using an absolute magnitude of 7.5 with an assumed albedo of 0.10.

Ground-based and James Webb Space Telescope spectroscopy have shown that 2006 RJ_{103} lacks clear signatures of water ice. Instead, its surface is covered by hydrated minerals that have 0.7 and 3.0 micron absorption features.

== Numbering and naming ==
This minor planet was numbered by the Minor Planet Center on 28 March 2022 (M.P.C. 139905). If named, it will follow the naming scheme already established with 385571 Otrera, which is to name these objects after figures related to the Amazons, an all-female warrior tribe that fought in the Trojan War on the side of the Trojans against the Greek.
