= Space weather Observations at L1 to Advance Readiness - 1 =

Space weather mission

Space weather Observations at L1 to Advance Readiness – 1
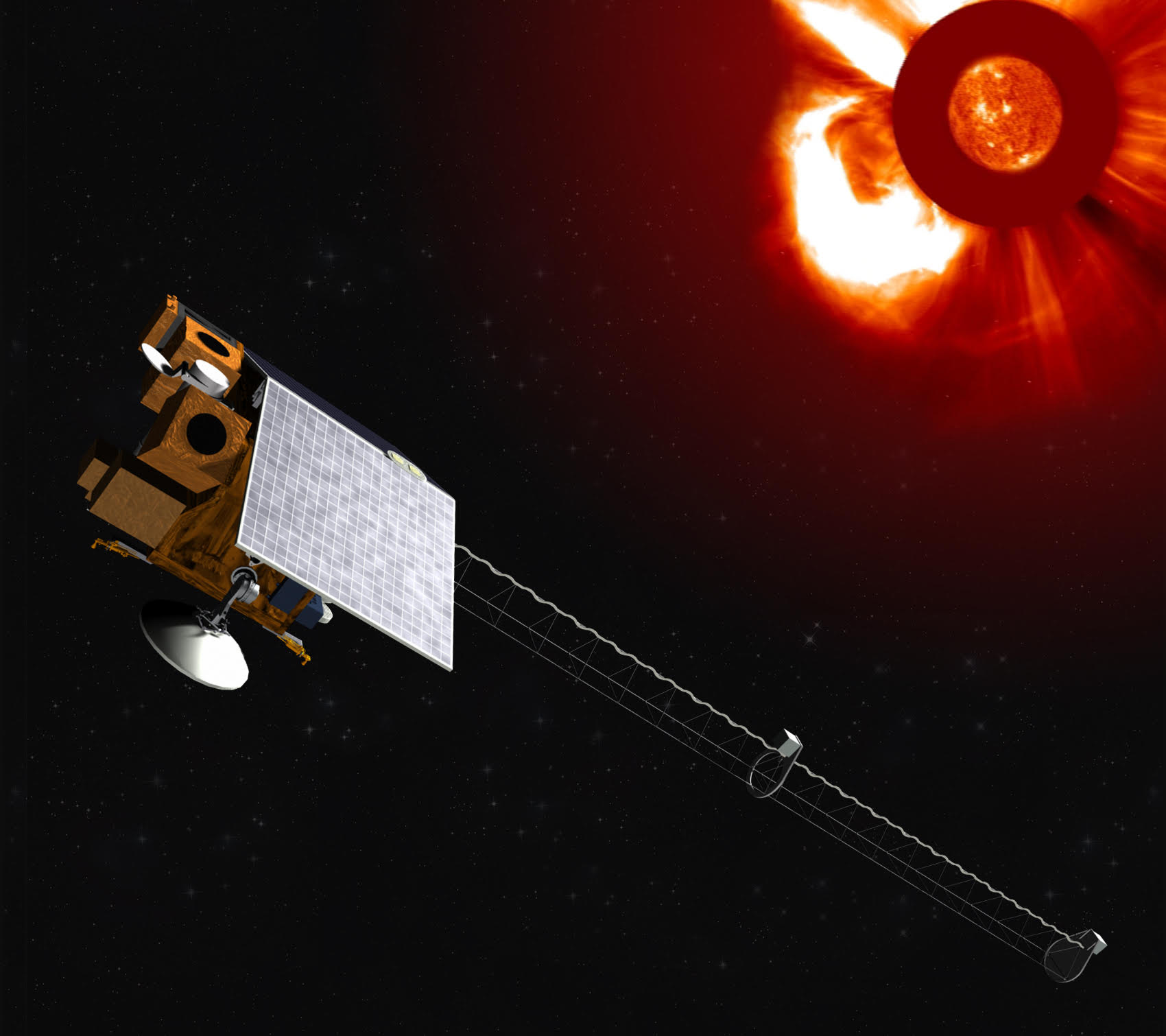
- SOLAR-1 satellite
- Names: Space Weather Follow On-Lagrange 1 (SWFO-L1)
- Mission type: Space weather
- Operator: NOAA
- COSPAR ID: 2025-215B
- SATCAT no.: 65726
- Mission duration: 11 months, 29 days (elapsed)

Start of mission
- Launch date: 24 September 2025, 11:30 UTC
- Rocket: Falcon 9 Block 5
- Launch site: Kennedy Space Center, LC-39A
- Contractor: SpaceX

Orbital parameters
- Reference system: Geocentric orbit
- Regime: L1

Instruments
- Solar Wind Instrument Suite (SWIS); Magnetometer; Solar Wind Plasma Sensor (SWiPS); Compact Coronagraph (CCOR); Supra-Thermal Ion Sensor (STIS)
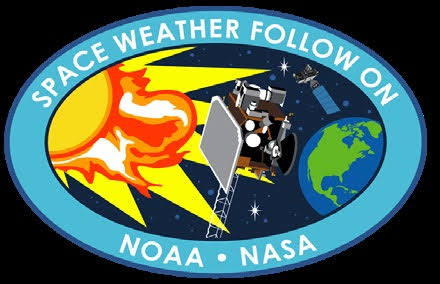
- Space Weather Follow On program

Animation of SWFO-L1 around Sun - frame rotating with Earth SWFO-L1 · Earth · Sun-Earth L1 point

SOLAR-1 (Space weather Observations at L1 to Advance Readiness – 1) is a spacecraft mission placed at the Sun–Earth L_{1} Lagrange point, a location between the Earth and the Sun, to monitor signs of solar storms which may pose harm to Earth's telecommunication network. This allows SOLAR-1 to continuously watch the solar wind and energetic particles heading for Earth. The spacecraft is operated by the National Oceanic and Atmospheric Administration (NOAA). It was launched on September 24, 2025.

SOLAR-1 was previously named SWFO-L1 (Space Weather Follow On-Lagrange 1) prior to its arrival at L_{1} on January 23, 2026, and became fully operational on June 10, 2026.

The MPC approved observatory code for SOLAR-1 is 314.

== Background ==
Together with space weather observation capabilities on the Earth-orbiting GOES-19 satellite, SOLAR-1 constitutes the space segment of NOAA's Space Weather Follow On (SWFO) program. The aim of the SWFO program is to ensure the robust continuity of space-based measurement of the critical space weather environment. All of the spacecraft located in L_{1} which are currently monitoring CMEs and the solar wind have operated beyond their design lifetime. SOLAR-1's SWIS instruments will replace ACE's and DSCOVR's monitoring of solar wind, energetic particles and the interplanetary magnetic field while CCOR will replace SOHO's LASCO (Large Angle and Spectrometric Coronagraph) imaging of CMEs.

== Instruments ==
The spacecraft's Solar Wind Instrument Suite (SWIS), which includes three instruments, monitors solar wind, and the Compact Coronagraph (CCOR) monitors the Sun's surroundings to image coronal mass ejection (CME).

The CCOR onboard SOLAR-1 will be designated as CCOR-2. CCOR-2 on SOLAR-1 will provide a field of view of 3 to 23.5 solar radii, partially comparable to LASCO C3's field of view onboard SOHO, with a 65 arcsecond spatial resolution. GOES-19 carries a copy of the CCOR designated as CCOR-1 with slight differences to its own field of view and spatial resolution, providing a field of view of 3.7 to 18.7 solar radii with a 33 arcsecond spatial resolution.

== Project history ==
In April 2020, Southwest Research Institute (SwRI) was awarded a contract to supply SOLAR-1's magnetometer instrument. The magnetometer instrument sits on the long boom and has been developed at the Institut für Weltraumforschung (Space Research Institute), Graz, Austria.

On 1 July 2020, on behalf of NOAA, NASA awarded the SOLAR-1 Solar Wind Plasma Sensor (SWiPS) contract to Southwest Research Institute (SwRI) in San Antonio, Texas. SwRI was awarded a contract with a total value of US$15.6 million. The period of performance is 76 months. SOLAR-1 will provide NOAA with the continuity of solar wind data and coronal mass ejection imagery, the National Weather Service's highest priority for space weather observations. University of California, Berkeley was awarded US$7.5 million for the development of the Supra-Thermal Ion Sensor (STIS). The SOLAR-1 satellite will collect upstream solar wind data and coronal imagery to support NOAA's mission to monitor and forecast space weather events. NOAA is responsible for the Space Weather Follow On program. NASA is the program's flight system procurement agent, and NASA's Goddard Space Flight Center in Greenbelt, Maryland, is the lead for this acquisition.

On 5 February 2021, NOAA awarded the SOLAR-1 Command and control contract to L3Harris in Melbourne, Florida. The contract has a total value of US$43.8 million, with a five-year performance period. The SOLAR-1 mission is planned to launch as a rideshare with NASA's Interstellar Mapping and Acceleration Probe (IMAP). The contractor is responsible for up to two years of operations support. This will be accomplished by adding the capability to the existing Geostationary Operational Environmental Satellite-R Series Core Ground System.

NOAA manages the contract. In addition to work at L3Harris' facility in Melbourne, the contractor will install equipment at the NOAA Satellite Operations Facility (NSOF) in Suitland, Maryland; NOAA's Wallops Command and Data Acquisition Station (WCDAS) in Wallops, Virginia; and at NOAA's Consolidated Backup Facility (CBU) in Fairmont, West Virginia. The work will allow SOLAR-1 to provide continuity of solar wind and coronal mass ejection imagery data from the L1 point to NOAA's National Weather Service Space Weather Prediction Center in Boulder, Colorado. These data are critical to support monitoring and timely forecasts of space weather events that have the potential to adversely impact elements vital to national security and economic prosperity, including telecommunication and navigation, satellite systems and the power grid. NOAA is responsible for overall implementation and funding of the SWFO program. The program is managed as an integrated NOAA-NASA program, where NASA serves as NOAA's acquisition agent for the space segment and for launch services. NOAA is responsible for the ground segment including the acquisition, development, test and integration of the SWFO Command and control system.

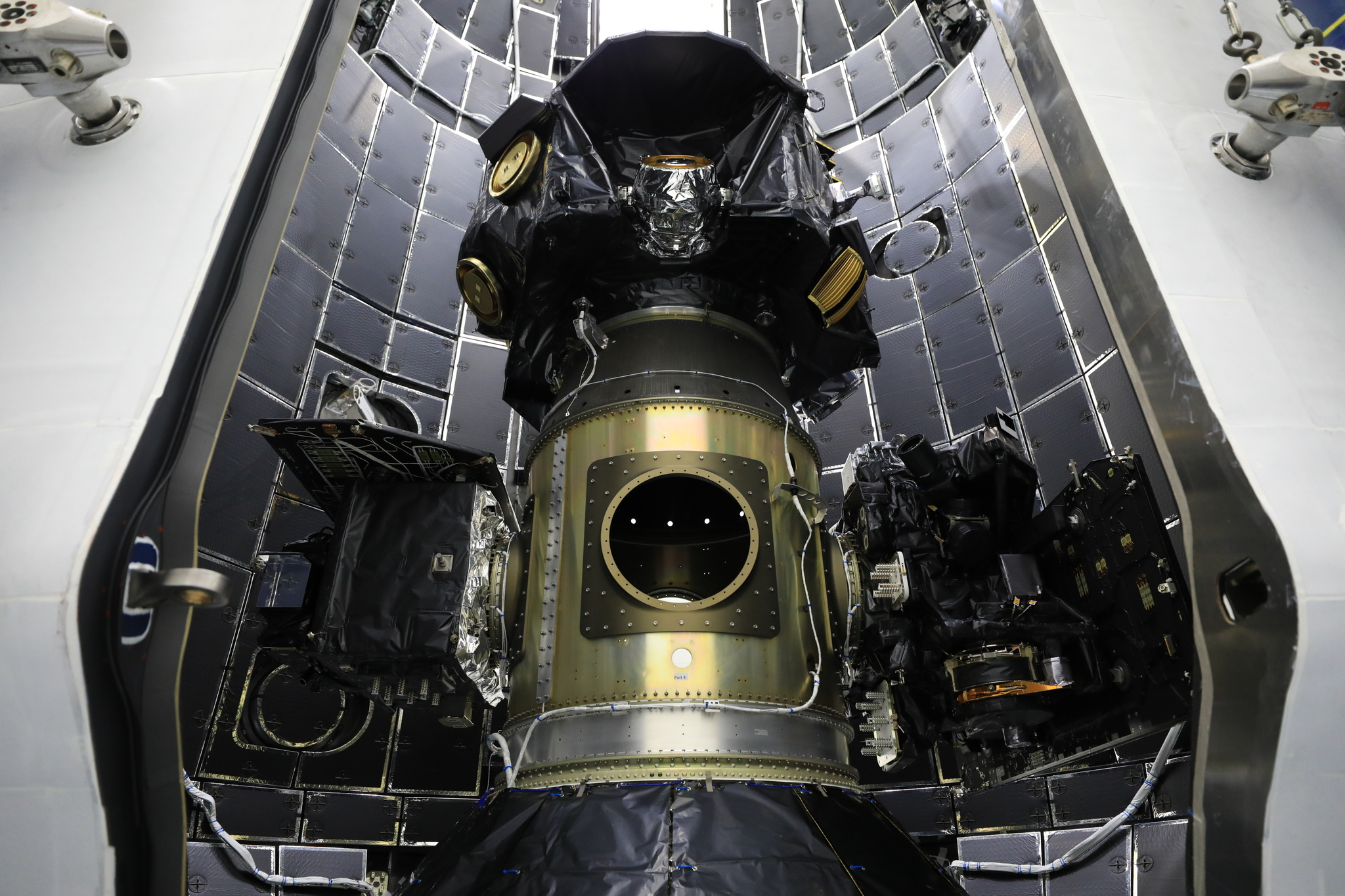
NOAA's SWFO-L1, along with NASA's Interstellar Mapping and Acceleration Probe (IMAP) and Carruthers Geocorona Observatory fully integrated for launch

== Launch ==
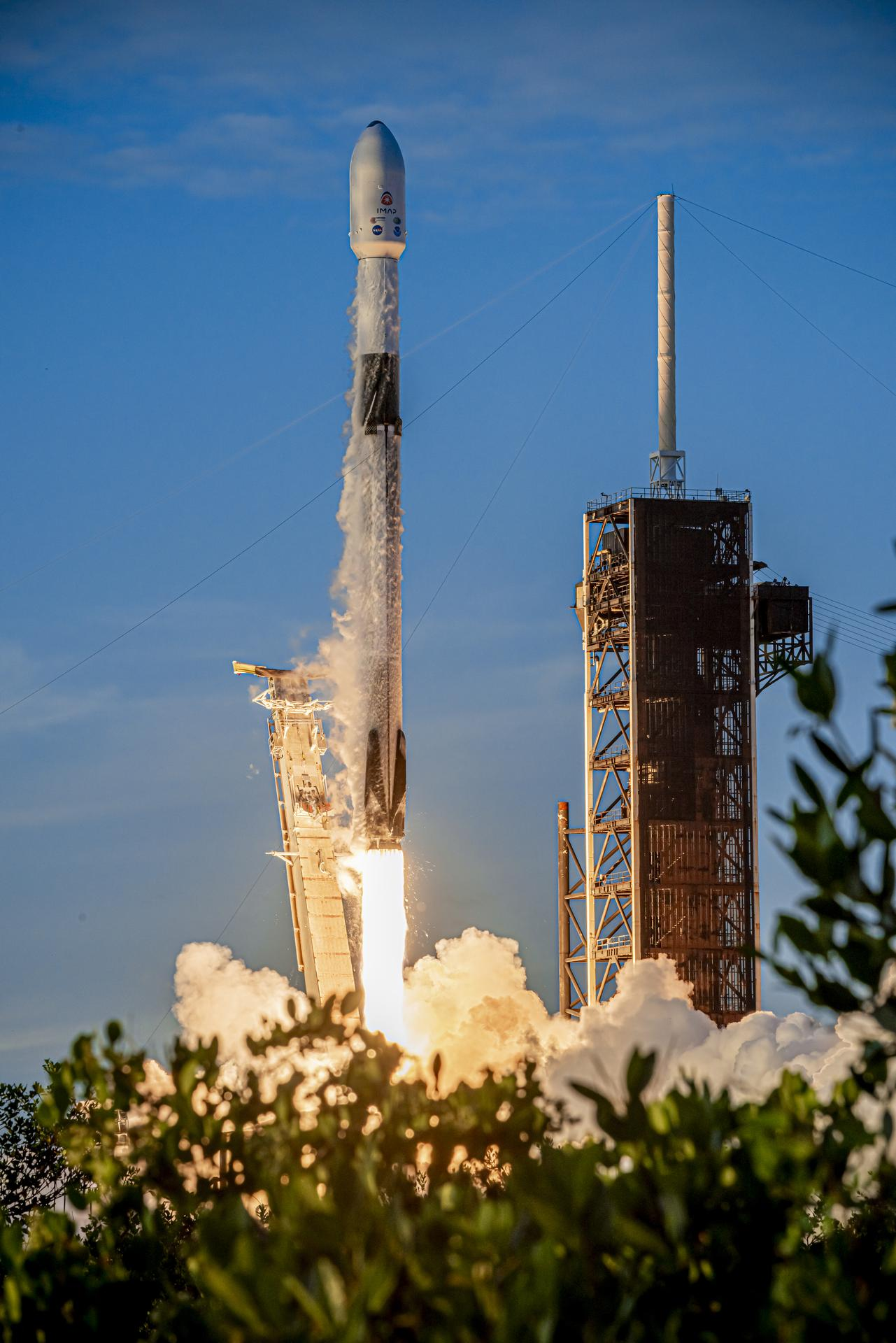
Launch of SOLAR-1

SOLAR-1 is an ESPA Class Spacecraft, sized for launch on an Evolved Expendable Launch Vehicle Secondary Payload Adapter (ESPA) Grande ring in addition to the rocket's primary payload. It was launched as a secondary payload on the SpaceX Falcon 9 launch vehicle carrying NASA's Interstellar Mapping and Acceleration Probe (IMAP) spacecraft on 24 September 2025, together with NASA's Carruthers Geocorona Observatory as another rideshare mission.

== See also ==
- List of objects at Lagrange points
