= 2005 TN53 =

Neptune trojan

2005 TN_{53}
Discovery
- Discovered by: C. Trujillo; S. S. Sheppard
- Discovery site: Las Campanas Obs.
- Discovery date: 7 October 2005 (discovery: first observation only)

Designations
- Minor planet category: Neptune trojan; L_{4}; centaur; distant

Orbital characteristics
- Epoch 21 November 2025 (JD 2461000.5)
- Uncertainty parameter 4
- Observation arc: 8.00 yr (2,921 days)
- Aphelion: 32.451 AU
- Perihelion: 28.154 AU
- Semi-major axis: 30.303 AU
- Eccentricity: 0.0709
- Orbital period (sidereal): 166.81 yr (60,928 days)
- Mean anomaly: 301.81°
- Mean motion: 0° 0^{m} 21.6^{s} / day
- Inclination: 24.989°
- Longitude of ascending node: 9.280°
- Argument of perihelion: 85.696°

Physical characteristics
- Dimensions: 68 km (est. at 0.10); 80 km
- Apparent magnitude: 23.7
- Absolute magnitude (H): 9.0

2005 TN_{53} is an inclined Neptune trojan leading Neptune's orbit in the outer Solar System, approximately 80 kilometers in diameter. It was first observed on 7 October 2005, by American astronomers Scott Sheppard and Chad Trujillo at Las Campanas Observatory in the Atacama desert of Chile. It was the third such body to be discovered, and the first with a significant orbital inclination, which showed that the population as a whole is very dynamically excited.

== Orbit and classification ==
Neptune trojans are resonant trans-Neptunian objects (TNO) in a 1:1 mean-motion orbital resonance with Neptune. These trojans have a semi-major axis and an orbital period very similar to Neptune's (30.10 AU; 164.8 years).

2005 TN_{53} belongs to the larger L_{4} group, which leads 60° ahead Neptune's orbit. It orbits the Sun with a semi-major axis of 30.014 AU at a distance of 28.1–31.9 AU once every 164 years and 5 months (60,059 days). Its orbit has an eccentricity of 0.06 and an inclination of 25° with respect to the ecliptic.

It has the same orbital period as Neptune and orbits at the L_{4} Lagrangian point about 60° ahead of Neptune. It has an inclination of 25 degrees.

== Physical characteristics ==
=== Diameter ===
The discoverers estimate that 2005 TN_{53} has a mean-diameter of 80 kilometers based on a magnitude of 23.7. Based on a generic magnitude-to-diameter conversion, it measures approximately 68 kilometers in diameter using an absolute magnitude of 9.0 and an assumed albedo of 0.10.

== Numbering and naming ==
Due to its orbital uncertainty, this minor planet has not been numbered and its official discoverers have not been determined. If named, it will follow the naming scheme already established with 385571 Otrera, which is to name these objects after figures related to the Amazons, an all-female warrior tribe that fought in the Trojan War on the side of the Trojans against the Greek.
