= Carruthers Geocorona Observatory =

Planned spacecraft mission

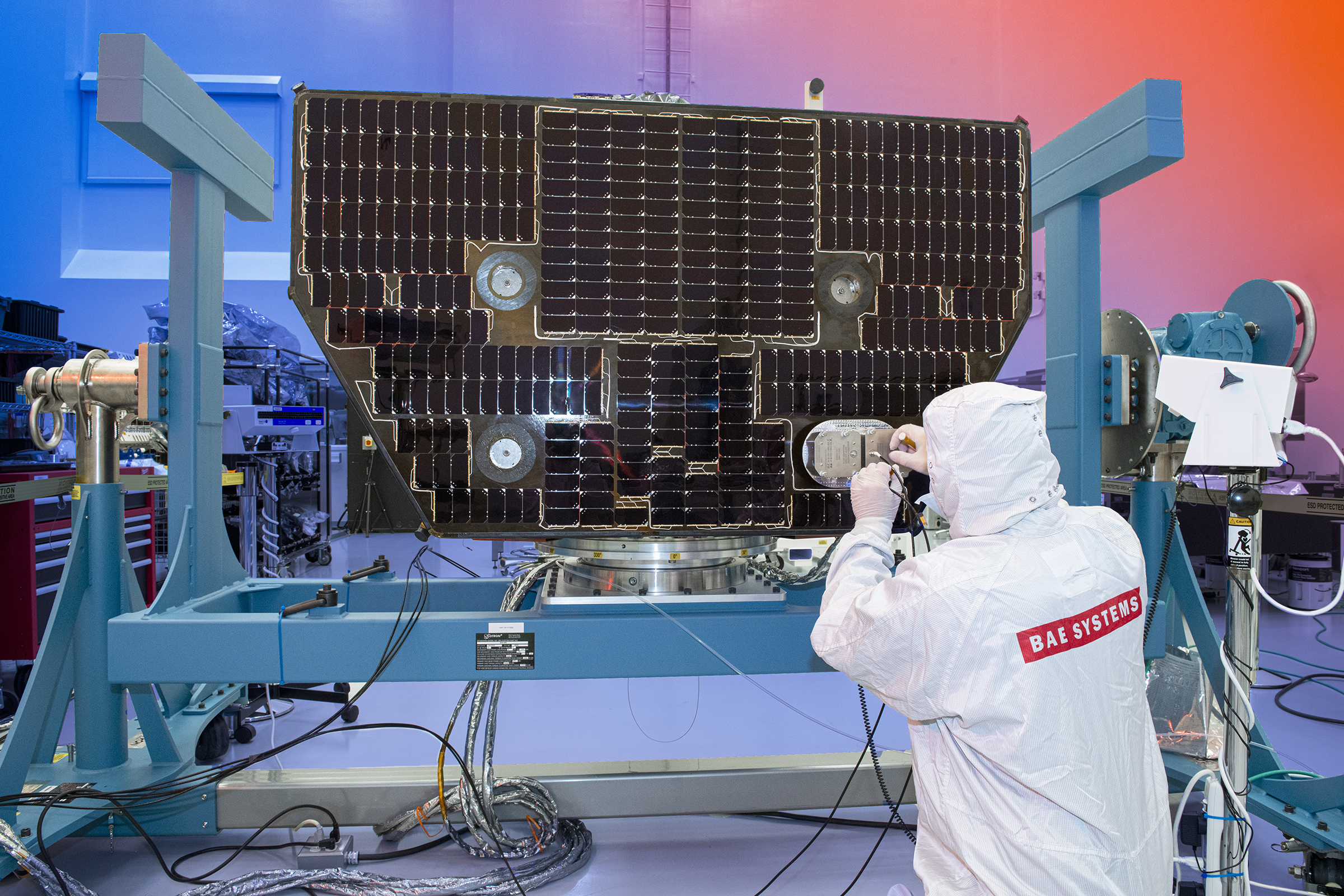
- A BAE systems technician inspecting the fully assembled Carruthers Geocorona Observatory
- Mission type: Space telescope
- Operator: NASA
- COSPAR ID: 2025-215C
- SATCAT no.: 65727
- Website: https://science.nasa.gov/mission/carruthers-geocorona-observatory/

Start of mission
- Launch date: 24 September 2025, 11:30 UTC
- Rocket: Falcon 9 Block 5
- Launch site: Kennedy, LC-39A
- Contractor: SpaceX

Orbital parameters
- Reference system: Geocentric orbit
- Regime: L1
- NASA insignia for Carruthers

The Carruthers Geocorona Observatory, previously called Global Lyman-alpha Imagers of the Dynamic Exosphere (GLIDE), is a NASA mission led by the University of Illinois, which will survey ultraviolet light emitted by Earth's outermost atmospheric layer, the exosphere, and geocorona.

== Name ==
The mission name was given to honour George R. Carruthers, a pioneer American space physicist, engineer, and inventor. He is widely recognised for his groundbreaking contributions to ultraviolet astronomy. His most famous invention was the Far Ultraviolet Camera/Spectrograph, a compact but powerful telescope that was placed by the astronauts of Apollo 16 on the Moon in 1972.

== Launch ==
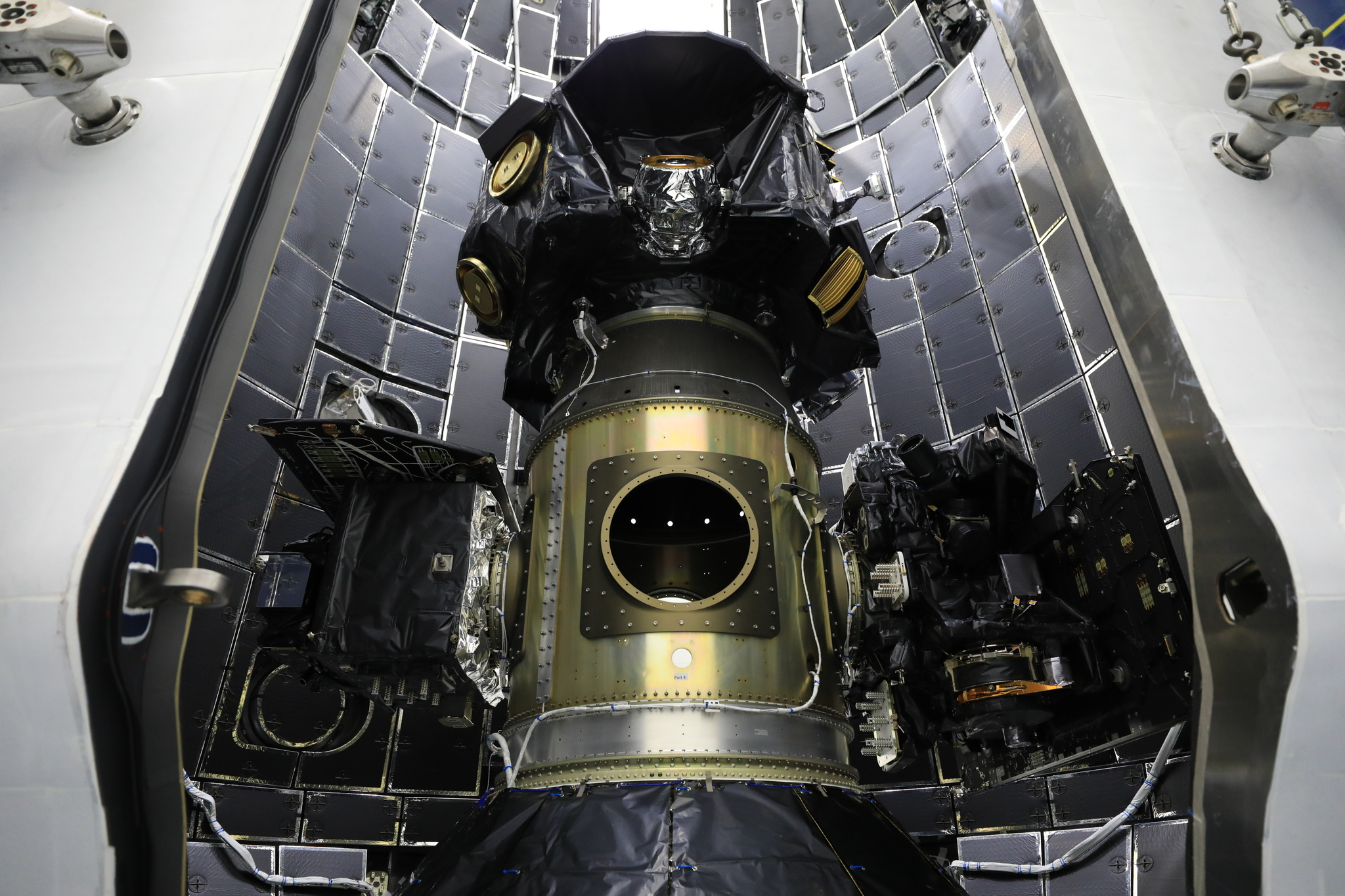
NOAA's SWFO-L1, along with NASA's Interstellar Mapping and Acceleration Probe (IMAP) and Carruthers Geocorona Observatory fully integrated for launch

Carruthers Geocorona Observatory was launched as a secondary payload on the SpaceX Falcon 9 launch vehicle carrying NASA's Interstellar Mapping and Acceleration Probe (IMAP) spacecraft, together with NOAA's SWFO-L1, on 24 September 2025.

Animation of Carruthers Geocorona Observatory

Around the Earth

Around the Sun - Frame rotating with Earth - Top view

Around the Sun - Frame rotating with Earth - Viewed from the Sun

Earth · Carruthers Geocorona Observatory · L_{1} point

== See also ==
- List of objects at Lagrange points
