= 2004 KV18 =

Neptune trojan

2004 KV_{18}
Discovery
- Discovery site: Mauna Kea Obs.
- Discovery date: 24 May 2004

Designations
- Minor planet category: Neptune trojan · L_{5} TNO · distant

Orbital characteristics
- Epoch 21 November 2025 (JD 2461000.5)
- Uncertainty parameter 4
- Observation arc: 17.19 yr (6,277 days)
- Aphelion: 35.688 AU
- Perihelion: 24.488 AU
- Semi-major axis: 30.088 AU
- Eccentricity: 0.1861
- Orbital period (sidereal): 165.04 yr (60,281 days)
- Mean anomaly: 90.039°
- Mean motion: 0° 0^{m} 21.6^{s} / day
- Inclination: 13.607°
- Longitude of ascending node: 235.69°
- Argument of perihelion: 293.85°

Physical characteristics
- Dimensions: 56 km (assumed); 71 km (est. at 0.10)
- Absolute magnitude (H): 8.74

2004 KV_{18} is an eccentric Neptune trojan trailing Neptune's orbit in the outer Solar System, approximately 70 kilometers in diameter. It was first observed on 24 May 2004, by astronomers at the Mauna Kea Observatories on Hawaii, United States. It was the eighth Neptune trojan identified and the second in Neptune's L_{5} Lagrangian point.

== Orbit and classification ==
Neptune trojans are resonant trans-Neptunian objects (TNO) in a 1:1 mean-motion orbital resonance with Neptune. These trojans have a semi-major axis and an orbital period very similar to Neptune's (30.10 AU; 164.8 years).

2004 KV_{18} belongs to the trailing L_{5} group, which follow 60° behind Neptune's orbit. It orbits the Sun with a semi-major axis of 30.088 AU at a distance of 24.5–35.7 AU once every 165 years and 0.5 months (60,281 days). Its orbit has a notably high eccentricity of 0.19 and an inclination of 14° with respect to the ecliptic.

=== Orbital instability ===
2004 KV_{18} is not a primordial Neptune trojan, and will leave the region on a relatively short time scale. The orbit of a Neptune trojan can only be stable when the eccentricity is less than 0.12. Its lifetime as a trailing Neptune trojan is on the order of 100,000 years into the future.

== Physical properties ==
=== Diameter and albedo ===
Based on a generic magnitude-to-diameter conversion, it measures approximately 71 kilometers in diameter using an absolute magnitude of 8.9 and an assumed albedo of 0.10. It is one of the smaller bodies among the first 17 Neptune trojans discovered so far, which measure between 60 and 200 kilometers (for an absolute magnitude of 9.3–6.6 and an assumed albedo of 0.10). Other estimates, implying a higher albedo than 0.10, gave a diameter of approximately 56 kilometers.

== Numbering and naming ==
Due to its orbital uncertainty, this minor planet has not been numbered and its official discoverers have not been determined. If named, it will follow the naming scheme already established with 385571 Otrera, which is to name these objects after figures related to the Amazons, an all-female warrior tribe that fought in the Trojan War on the side of the Trojans against the Greek.
