= Deep Space Climate Observatory =

American solar research spacecraft

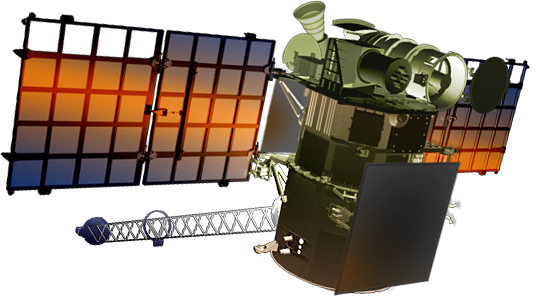
- An artist's rendering of DSCOVR satellite
- Names: DSCOVR; Triana; AlGoreSat
- Mission type: Space weather
- Operator: NASA / NOAA
- COSPAR ID: 2015-007A
- SATCAT no.: 40390
- Website: www.nesdis.noaa.gov/dscovr
- Mission duration: 5 years (planned); 11 years, 3 months, 16 days (elapsed)

Spacecraft properties
- Bus: SMEX-Lite
- Manufacturer: Goddard Space Flight Center
- Launch mass: 570 kg (1,260 lb)
- Dimensions: Undeployed: 1.4 × 1.8 m (4 ft 7 in × 5 ft 11 in)
- Power: 600 watts

Start of mission
- Launch date: 11 February 2015, 23:03:42 UTC
- Rocket: Falcon 9 v1.1
- Launch site: Cape Canaveral, SLC-40, Florida
- Contractor: SpaceX
- Entered service: 8 June 2015

Orbital parameters
- Reference system: Heliocentric orbit
- Regime: Sun-Earth Lagrange point L1
- Period: six-month
Instruments
- PlasMag: Plasma-Magnetometer
- NISTAR: National Institute of Standards and Technology Advanced Radiometer
- EPIC: Earth Polychromatic Imaging Camera
- ES: Electron Spectrometer
- PHA: Pulse Height Analyzer
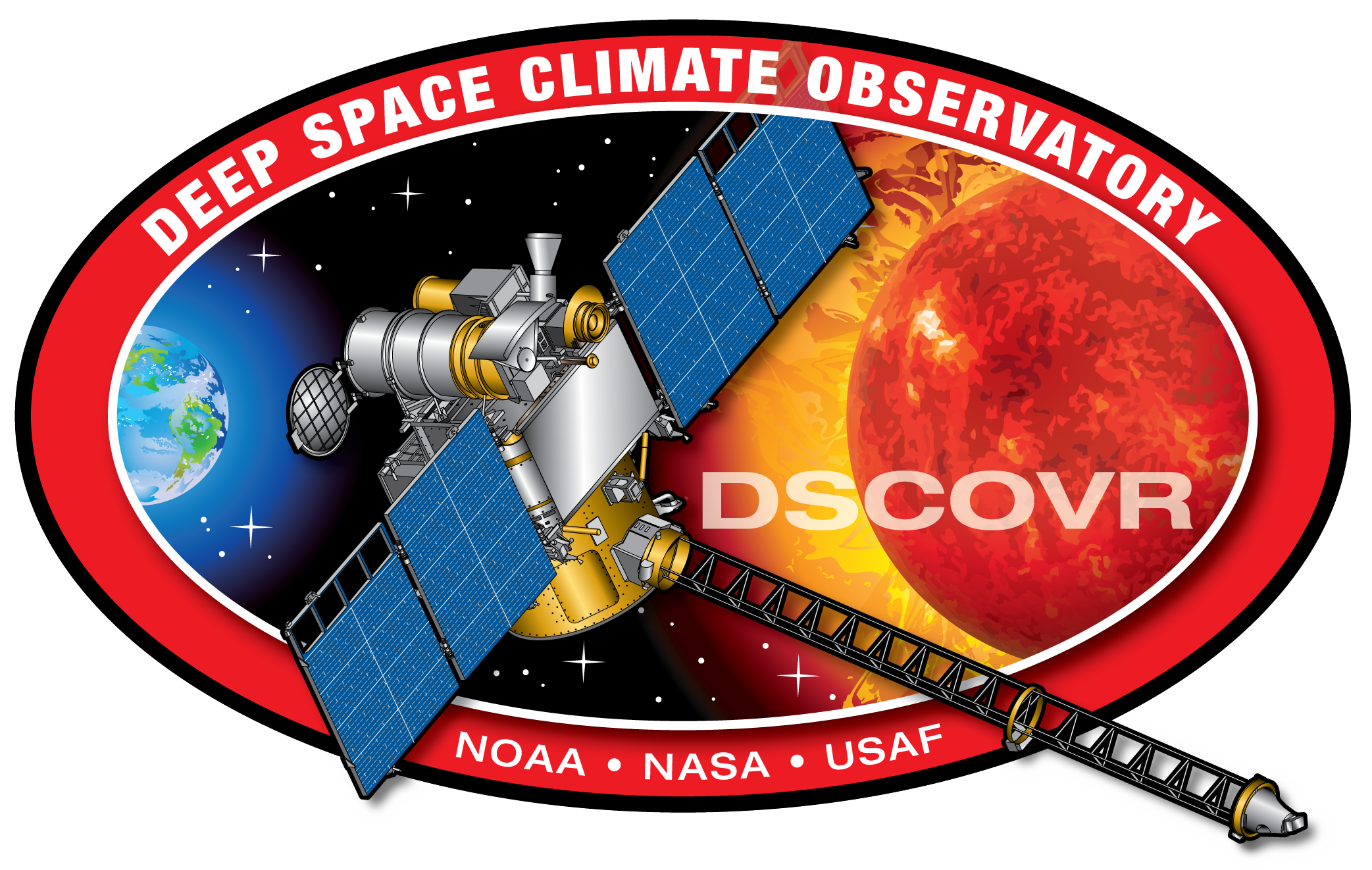
- DSCOVR logo Space Weather program

Deep Space Climate Observatory (DSCOVR; formerly known as Triana and unofficially as GoreSat) is a United States National Oceanic and Atmospheric Administration (NOAA) space weather, space climate, and Earth observation satellite. It was launched by SpaceX on a Falcon 9 v1.1 launch vehicle on 11 February 2015, from Cape Canaveral, Florida. This is NOAA's first operational deep space satellite and became its primary system of warning Earth in the event of solar magnetic storms.

DSCOVR was originally proposed as an Earth observation spacecraft positioned at the Sun-Earth L_{1} Lagrange point, providing live video of the sunlit side of the planet through the Internet as well as scientific instruments to study climate change. Political changes in the United States resulted in the mission's cancellation, and in 2001 the spacecraft was placed into storage.

Proponents of the mission continued to push for its reinstatement, and a change in presidential administration in 2009 resulted in DSCOVR being taken out of storage and refurbished, and its mission was refocused to solar observation and early warning of coronal mass ejections while still providing Earth observation and climate monitoring. It launched aboard a SpaceX Falcon 9 launch vehicle on 11 February 2015, and reached L_{1} on 8 June 2015, joining the list of objects orbiting at Lagrange points.

NOAA operates DSCOVR from its Satellite and Product Operations Facility in Suitland, Maryland. The acquired space data that allows for accurate weather forecasts are carried out in the Space Weather Prediction Center in Boulder, Colorado. Archival records are held by the National Centers for Environmental Information, and processing of Earth sensor data is carried out by the National Aeronautics and Space Administration (NASA).

== History ==
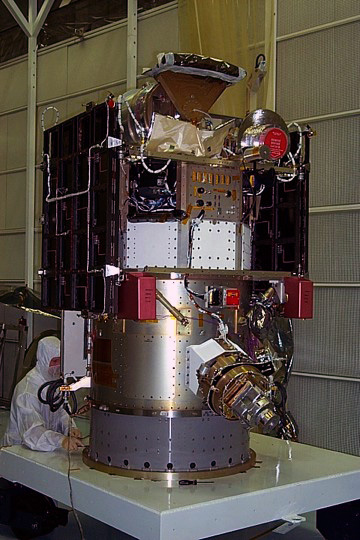
Deep Space Climate Observatory (DSCOVR)

DSCOVR began as a proposal in 1998 by then-Vice President Al Gore for the purpose of whole-Earth observation at the Sun-Earth L_{1} Lagrange point, 1.5×10^{6} km (0.93×10^{6} mi) from Earth. Originally known as Triana, named after Rodrigo de Triana, the first of Columbus's crew to sight land in the Americas, the spacecraft's original purpose was to provide a near-continuous view of the entire Earth and make that live image available via the Internet. Gore hoped not only to advance science with these images, but also to raise awareness of the Earth itself, updating the influential Blue Marble photograph that was taken by Apollo 17. In addition to an imaging camera, a radiometer would take the first direct measurements of how much sunlight is reflected and emitted from the whole Earth (albedo). This data could constitute a barometer for the process of global warming. The scientific goals expanded to measure the amount of solar energy reaching Earth, cloud patterns, weather systems, monitor the health of Earth's vegetation, and track the amount of UV light reaching the surface through the ozone layer.

In 1999, NASA's Inspector General reported that "the basic concept of the Triana mission was not peer reviewed", and "Triana's added science may not represent the best expenditure of NASA's limited science funding". Members of the U.S. Congress asked the National Academy of Sciences whether the project was worthwhile. The resulting report, released March 2000, stated that the mission was "strong and scientifically vital".

The Bush administration put the project on hold shortly after George W. Bush's inauguration in January 2001. Triana was removed from its original launch opportunity on STS-107 (the ill-fated Columbia mission in 2003). The US$150 million spacecraft was placed into nitrogen blanketed storage at Goddard Space Flight Center in November 2001 and remained there for the duration of the Bush administration. NASA renamed the spacecraft Deep Space Climate Observatory (DSCOVR) in 2003 in an attempt to regain support for the project, but the mission was formally terminated by NASA in 2005.

In November 2008, funded by National Oceanic and Atmospheric Administration (NOAA) and the U.S. Air Force, the spacecraft was removed from storage and underwent testing to determine its viability for launch. After the Obama administration took presidency in 2009, that year's budget included US$9 million marked for refurbishment and readiness of the spacecraft, resulting in NASA refurbishing the EPIC instrument and recalibrating the NISTAR instrument. Al Gore used part of his book Our Choice (2009) as an attempt to revive debate on the DSCOVR payload. The book mentions legislative efforts by senators Barbara Mikulski and Bill Nelson to get the spacecraft launched. In February 2011, the Obama administration attempted to secure funding to re-purpose the DSCOVR spacecraft as a solar observatory to replace the aging Advanced Composition Explorer (ACE) spacecraft, and requested US$47.3 million in the 2012 fiscal budget toward this purpose. Part of this funding was to allow the Naval Research Laboratory (NRL) to construct a coronal mass ejection imager for the spacecraft, but the time required would have delayed DSCOVR's launch and it was ultimately not included. NOAA allocated US$2 million in its 2011 budget to initiate the refurbishment effort, and increased funding to US$29.8 million in 2012.

In 2012, the Air Force allocated US$134.5 million to procure a launch vehicle and fund launch operations, both of which were awarded to SpaceX for their Falcon 9 rocket. In September 2013, NASA cleared DSCOVR to proceed to the implementation phase targeting an early 2015 launch, which ultimately took place on 11 February 2015. NASA's Goddard Space Flight Center is providing management and systems engineering to the mission.

In the 2017 documentary, An Inconvenient Sequel: Truth to Power, Al Gore speaks of the history of the DSCOVR spacecraft and its relation to climate change.

== Spacecraft ==
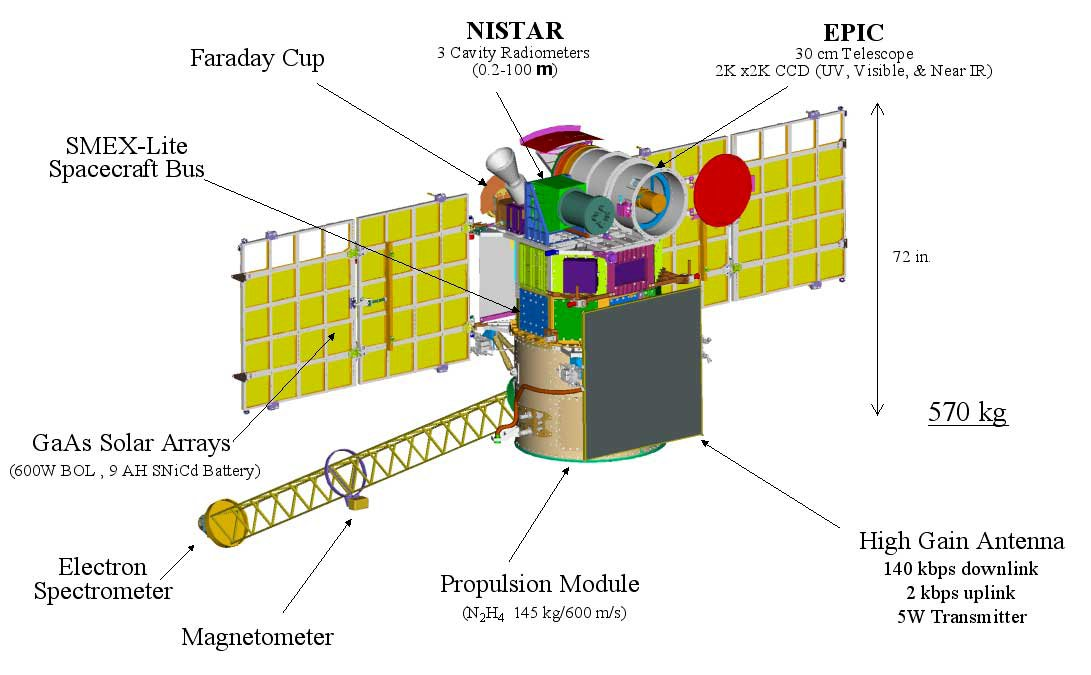
Diagram of DSCOVR

DSCOVR is built on the SMEX-Lite spacecraft bus and has a launch mass of approximately 570 kg (1,260 lb). The main science instrument sets are the Sun-observing Plasma Magnetometer (PlasMag) and the Earth-observing NIST Advanced Radiometer (NISTAR) and Earth Polychromatic Imaging Camera (EPIC). DSCOVR has two deployable solar arrays, a propulsion module, boom, and antenna.

The propulsion module had 145 kg of hydrazine propellant at launch.

From its vantage point, DSCOVR monitors variable solar wind conditions, provides early warning of approaching coronal mass ejections and observes phenomena on Earth, including changes in ozone, aerosols, dust and volcanic ash, cloud height, vegetation cover and climate. At its Sun-Earth L_{1} location it has a continuous view of the Sun and of the sunlit side of the Earth. After the spacecraft arrived on-site and entered its operational phase, NASA began releasing near-real-time images of Earth through the EPIC instrument's website. DSCOVR takes full-Earth pictures about every two hours and is able to process them faster than other Earth observation satellites.

The spacecraft is in a looping halo orbit around the Sun–Earth Lagrange point L1 in a six-month period, with a spacecraft–Earth–Sun angle varying from 4° to 15°.

=== Instruments ===
==== PlasMag ====
The Plasma-Magnetometer (PlasMag) measures solar wind for space weather predictions. It can provide early warning detection of solar activity that could cause damage to existing satellite systems and ground infrastructure. Because solar particles reach L_{1} about an hour before Earth, PlasMag can provide a warning of 15 to 60 minutes before a coronal mass ejection (CME) arrives. It does this by measuring "the magnetic field and the velocity distribution functions of the electron, proton and alpha particles (helium nuclei) of solar wind". It has three instruments:

- Magnetometer measures magnetic field
- Faraday cup measures positively charged particles
- Electrostatic analyzer measures electrons

==== EPIC ====
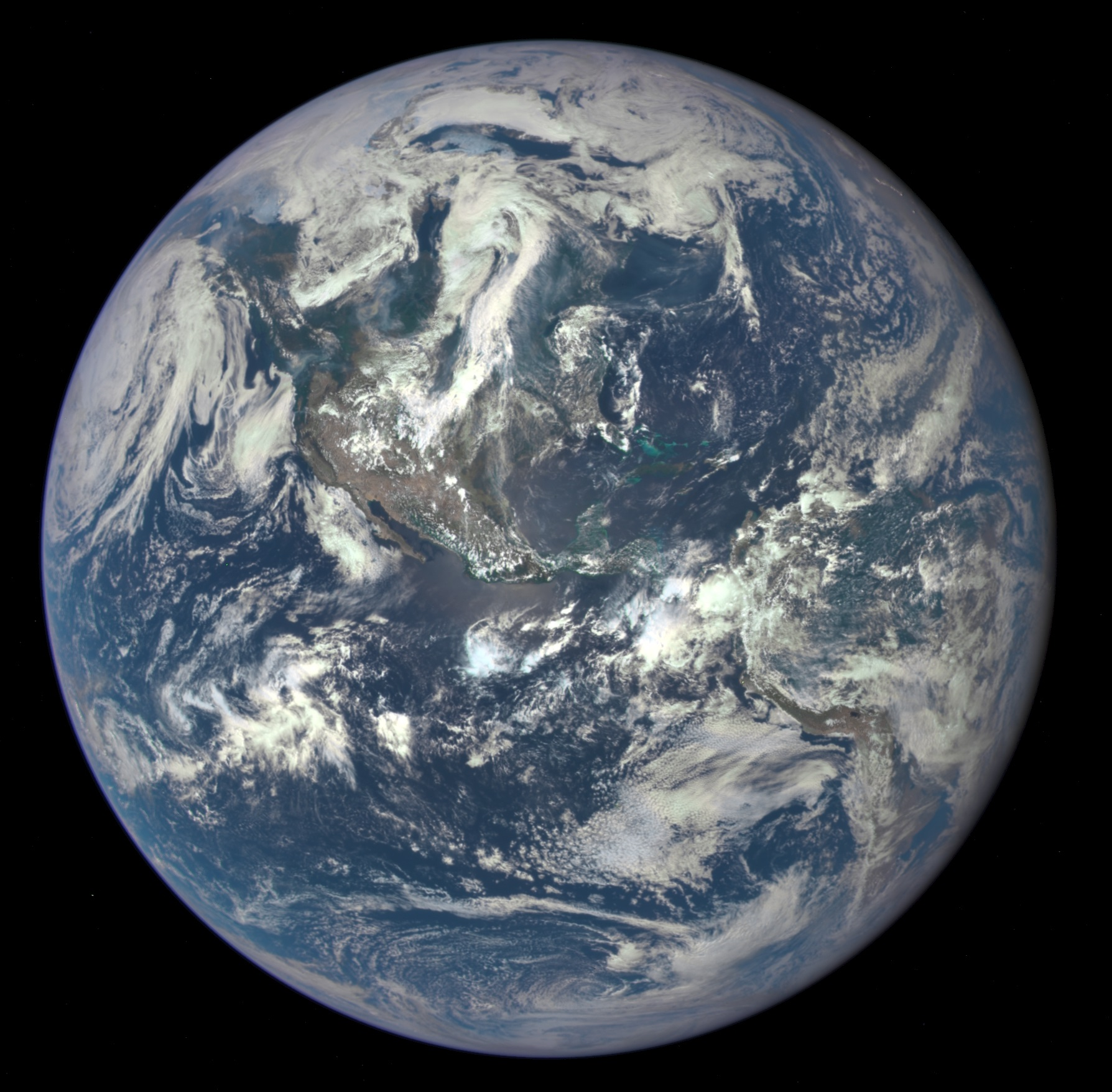
The first EPIC image, released by NASA on 6 July 2015, shows the full sunlit Earth from 1,475,207 km (916,651 mi) or nearly four lunar distances away, centered on the Americas.

The Earth Polychromatic Imaging Camera (EPIC) takes images of the sunlit side of Earth for various Earth science monitoring purposes in ten different channels from ultraviolet to near-infrared. Ozone and aerosol levels are monitored along with cloud dynamics, properties of the land, and vegetation.

EPIC has an aperture diameter of 30.5 cm (12.0 in), a focal ratio of 9.38, a field of view of 0.61°, and an angular sampling resolution of 1.07 arcseconds. Earth's apparent diameter varies from 0.45° to 0.53° full width. Exposure time for each of the 10 narrowband channels (317, 325, 340, 388, 443, 552, 680, 688, 764, and 779 nm) is about 40 ms. The camera produces 2048 × 2048 pixel images, but to increase the number of downloadable images to ten per hour the resolution is averaged to 1024 × 1024 on board. The final resolution is 25 km/pixel (16 mi/pixel).

==== NISTAR ====
The National Institute of Standards and Technology Advanced Radiometer (NISTAR) was designed and built between 1999 and 2001 by NIST in Gaithersburg, MD and Ball Aerospace & Technologies in Boulder, Colorado. NISTAR measures irradiance of the sunlit face of the Earth. This means that NISTAR measures if the atmosphere of Earth is taking in more or less solar energy than it is radiating back towards space. This data is to be used to study changes in Earth's radiation budget caused by natural and human activities.

Using NISTAR data, scientists can help determine the impact that humanity is having on the atmosphere of Earth and make the necessary changes to help balance the radiation budget. The radiometer measures in four channels:

- For total radiation in ultraviolet, visible and infrared in the range 0.2–100 μm
- For reflected solar radiation in the ultraviolet, visible and near-infrared in the range 0.2–4 μm
- For reflected solar radiation in infrared in the range 0.7–4 μm
- For calibration purposes in the range 0.3–1 μm

== Launch ==
The DSCOVR launch was conducted by launch provider SpaceX using their Falcon 9 v1.1 rocket. The launch of DSCOVR took place on 11 February 2015, following two scrubbed launches. It took DSCOVR 110 days from when it left Cape Canaveral Air Force Station (CCAFS), Florida, to reach its target destination 1.5×10^{6} km (0.93×10^{6} mi) away from Earth orbiting the Sun-Earth L1 Lagrange point.

=== Launch attempt history ===
Attempt	Planned	Result	Turnaround	Reason	Decision point	Weather go (%)	Notes
1	8 Feb 2015, 11:10:00 pm	Scrubbed	—	Technical	(T02:40:00)	>90	Range issues: tracking, first-stage video transmitter issues noted
2	10 Feb 2015, 11:04:49 pm	Scrubbed	1 day 23 hours 55 minutes	Weather		80	Upper-level winds at the launch pad exceeded 100 knots (190 km/h; 120 mph) at 7,600 m (24,900 ft)
3	11 Feb 2015, 11:03:42 pm	Success	0 days 23 hours 59 minutes			>90	

== Operation ==
An animation of Deep Space Climate Observatory's trajectory

An oblique view

As viewed from the Sun:

Deep Space Climate Observatory · Earth · Moon · L1 point

On 6 July 2015, DSCOVR returned its first publicly released view of the entire earthlight side of Earth from 1,475,207 km (916,651 mi) away, taken by the EPIC instrument. EPIC provides a daily series of Earth images, enabling the first-time study of daily variations over the entire globe. The images, available 12 to 36 hours after they are made, have been posted to a dedicated web page since September 2015.

DSCOVR was placed in operation at the L1 Lagrange point to monitor the Sun, because the constant stream of particles from the Sun (the solar wind) reaches L1 about 60 minutes before reaching Earth. DSCOVR will usually be able to provide a 15- to 60-minute warning before a surge of particles and magnetic field from a coronal mass ejection (CME) reaches Earth and creates a geomagnetic storm. DSCOVR data will also be used to improve predictions of the impact locations of a geomagnetic storm to be able to take preventative action. Electronic technologies such as satellites in geosynchronous orbit are at risk of unplanned disruptions without warnings from DSCOVR and other monitoring satellites at L1.

On 16–17 July 2015, DSCOVR took a series of images showing the Moon during a transit of Earth. The images were taken between 19:50 and 00:45 UTC. The animation was composed of monochrome images taken in different color filters at 30-second intervals for each frame, resulting in a slight color fringing for the Moon in each finished frame. Due to its position at Sun–Earth L1, DSCOVR will always see the Moon illuminated and will always see its far side when it passes in front of Earth.

On 19 October 2015, NASA opened a new website to host near-live "Blue Marble" images taken by EPIC of Earth. Twelve images are released each day, every two hours, showcasing Earth as it rotates on its axis. The resolution of the images ranges from 10 to 15 km per pixel (6 to 9 mi/pixel), and the short exposure times renders points of starlight invisible.

On 27 June 2019, DSCOVR was put into safe mode due to an anomaly with the laser gyroscope of the Miniature Inertial Measurement Unit (MIMU), part of the spacecraft's attitude control system. Operators programmed a software patch that allows DSCOVR to operate without a laser gyroscope, using only the star tracker for angular rate information. DSCOVR came out of the safe hold on 2 March 2020, and resumed normal operations.

On 16 July 2025, DSCOVR suffered a software bus anomaly, which put it offline without an estimated date for recovery. On 12 October 2025, the amateur-operated Dwingeloo Radio Observatory received signals again., after which AMSAT-DL successfully downloaded EPIC images on 23 October 2025.

== Picture Sequences ==
The Moon transiting Earth, 16 July 2015. The far side of the Moon faces the camera.

The Earth depicted with its 23.4° tilt (the cause of the seasons) on EPIC's 268th day of operation, 25 September 2015, a few days after the September equinox.

The Earth's rotation on 29 May 2016, a few weeks prior to the June solstice, with the Northern Hemisphere tilted toward the Sun.

From space, the Moon's shadow during the solar eclipse of 9 March 2016 appears as a dark spot moving across the Earth.

== See also ==
- Clouds and the Earth's Radiant Energy System
- STEREO
- Visual Monitoring Camera
- List of Falcon 9 and Falcon Heavy launches
