= (612243) 2001 QR322 =

Neptune trojan

(612243) 2001 QR_{322}
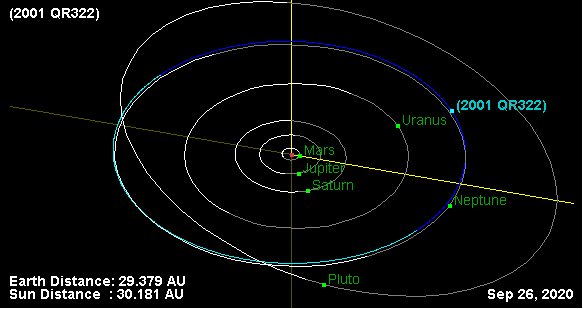

Discovery
- Discovered by: M. W. Buie (DES)
- Discovery site: Cerro Tololo Obs.
- Discovery date: 21 August 2001

Designations
- Minor planet category: Neptune trojan · L_{4} TNO · distant

Orbital characteristics
- Epoch 4 September 2017 (JD 2458000.5)
- Uncertainty parameter 3
- Observation arc: 12.26 yr (4,479 days)
- Aphelion: 30.968 AU
- Perihelion: 29.262 AU
- Semi-major axis: 30.115 AU
- Eccentricity: 0.0283
- Orbital period (sidereal): 165.27 yr (60,363 days)
- Mean anomaly: 86.551°
- Mean motion: 0° 0^{m} 21.6^{s} / day
- Inclination: 1.3250°
- Longitude of ascending node: 151.75°
- Argument of perihelion: 151.11°

Physical characteristics
- Mean diameter: 132 km
- Geometric albedo: 0.058
- Apparent magnitude: 22.5
- Absolute magnitude (H): 8.12

(612243) 2001 QR_{322} is a minor planet and the first Neptune trojan discovered, by American astronomer Marc Buie of the Deep Ecliptic Survey at Cerro Tololo Observatory in Chile on 21 August 2001. It orbits ahead of Neptune at its L_{4} Lagrangian point and measures approximately 132 kilometers (82 miles) in diameter.

Other Neptune trojans have been discovered since. A study by American astronomers Scott Sheppard and Chad Trujillo from the Carnegie Institution suggests that Neptune could possibly have twenty times more trojans than Jupiter.

== Orbit ==
2001 QR_{322} orbits the Sun with a semi-major axis of 30.115 AU at a distance of 29.3–31.0 AU once every 165 years and 3 months (60,363 days). Its orbit has an eccentricity of 0.03 and an inclination of 1° with respect to the ecliptic.

=== Dynamical stability ===
Early studies of the dynamical stability of 2001 QR_{322}, which used a small number of test particles spread over the uncertainties of just a few orbital parameters that were derived from a limited observation arc, suggested that 2001 QR_{322} is on a remarkably stable orbit, because most test particles remained on trojan orbits for 5 Gyr. Thereafter, the stability of Neptune trojans was simply assumed.

A more recent study, which used a very large number of test particles spread over the 3σ uncertainties in all six orbital parameters derived from a longer observational arc, has indicated that 2001 QR_{322} is far less dynamically stable than previously thought. The test particles were lost exponentially with a half life of 553 Myr. Further observations can determine whether 2001 QR_{322}'s orbit is actually within the dynamically stable or within the unstable part.

The stability is strongly dependent on semi-major axis, with a≥30.30 AU being far less stable, but only very weakly dependent on the other orbital parameters. This is because those with larger semi-major axes have larger libration amplitudes, with amplitudes ~70° and above being destabilized by secondary resonances between the trojan motion and the dynamics of at least Saturn, Uranus, and Neptune. Secular resonances were found not to contribute to the dynamical stability of 2001 QR_{322}.

== Numbering and naming ==
This minor planet was numbered and its discoverer determined by the Minor Planet Center on 28 March 2022 (M.P.C. 139893). If named, it will follow the naming scheme already established with 385571 Otrera, which is to name these objects after figures related to the Amazons, an all-female warrior tribe that fought in the Trojan War on the side of the Trojans against the Greek.

== Physical characteristics ==
The discoverers estimate that the body has a mean diameter of 132 kilometers with a low albedo of 0.058 at an absolute magnitude of 8.12. It has a visual magnitude of 22.5.
