= Palomar Distant Solar System Survey =

Astronomical survey at Palomar Observatory

The Palomar Distant Solar System Survey (PDSSS) was a wide-field survey aimed at finding distant trans-Neptunian objects. It used the robotic 1.2 m Samuel Oschin Telescope at Palomar Observatory and the QUEST large-area CCD camera in 2007 and 2008.

The survey was designed to identify putative members of a Sedna-like population with perihelia greater than 45 AU. The limiting magnitude of this study was 21.3 in the R-band; it was sensitive out to distances of 1000 AU, and 12,000 square degrees of sky were searched. This observing program was responsible for the discovery of 25 minor planets including trans-Neptunian objects and centaurs. The dwarf planet Gonggong and large scattered disc object Gǃkúnǁʼhòmdímà (2007 UK_{126}) were among the objects discovered by this survey. It redetected Sedna but no other objects in Sedna-like orbits were identified.
