= Neptune trojan =

Asteroid sharing the orbit of Neptune

Neptune's L_{4} trojans with plutinos for reference.: Neptune trojans (selection) · 2001 QR322 · 2005 TN53 · 2007 VL305 / Plutinos · Pluto · Orcus · Ixion

Neptune trojans are small Solar System bodies that orbit the Sun near one of the stable Lagrangian points of Neptune, similar to the trojans of other planets. They therefore have approximately the same orbital period as Neptune and follow roughly the same orbital path. 35 Neptune trojans are currently known, of which 28 orbit near the Sun–Neptune L_{4} Lagrangian point 60° ahead of Neptune and 7 orbit near Neptune's L_{5} region 60° behind Neptune. The Neptune trojans are termed 'trojans' by analogy with the Jupiter trojans.

The discovery of 2005 TN53 in a high-inclination (>25°) orbit was significant, because it suggested a "thick" cloud of trojans (Jupiter trojans have inclinations up to 40°), which is indicative of freeze-in capture instead of in situ or collisional formation. It is suspected that large (radius ≈ 100 km) Neptune trojans could outnumber Jupiter trojans of that size by an order of magnitude.

In 2010, the discovery of the first known L_{5} Neptune trojan, 2008 LC18, was announced. Neptune's trailing L_{5} region is currently very difficult to observe because when viewed from Earth, it is along the line of sight to the center of the Milky Way, an area of the sky crowded with stars.

== Discovery and exploration ==
In 2001, the first Neptune trojan was discovered, (612243) 2001 QR322, near Neptune's L_{4} region, and with it the fifth (Note: After the asteroid belt, the Jupiter trojans, the trans-Neptunian objects and the Mars trojans.) known populated stable reservoir of small bodies in the Solar System. In 2005, the discovery of the high-inclination trojan 2005 TN53 has indicated that the Neptune trojans populate thick clouds, which has constrained their possible origins (see below).

On August 12, 2010, the first L_{5} trojan, 2008 LC18, was announced. It was discovered by a dedicated survey that scanned regions where the light from the stars near the Galactic Center is obscured by dust clouds. This suggests that large L_{5} trojans are as common as large L_{4} trojans, to within uncertainty, further constraining models about their origins (see below).

It would have been possible for the New Horizons spacecraft to investigate L_{5} Neptune trojans discovered by 2014, when it passed through this region of space en route to Pluto. Some of the patches where the light from the Galactic Center is obscured by dust clouds are along New Horizons's flight path, allowing detection of objects that the spacecraft could image. 2011 HM102, the highest-inclination Neptune trojan known, was just bright enough for New Horizons to observe it in end-2013 at a distance of 1.2 AU. However, New Horizons may not have had sufficient downlink bandwidth, so it was eventually decided to give precedence to the preparations for the Pluto flyby.

== Dynamics and origin ==
An animation showing the path of six of Neptune's L_{4} trojans in a rotating frame with a period equal to Neptune's orbital period. Neptune is held stationary. (Click to view.)

The orbits of Neptune trojans are highly stable; Neptune may have retained up to 50% of the original post-migration trojan population over the age of the Solar System. Neptune's L_{5} can host stable trojans equally well as its L_{4}. Neptune trojans can librate up to 30° from their associated Lagrangian points with a 10,000-year period. Neptune trojans that escape enter orbits similar to centaurs. Although Neptune cannot currently capture stable trojans, roughly 2.8% of the centaurs within 34 AU are predicted to be Neptune co-orbitals. Of these, 54% would be in horseshoe orbits, 10% would be quasi-satellites, and 36% would be trojans (evenly split between the L_{4} and L_{5} groups).

The unexpected high-inclination trojans are the key to understanding the origin and evolution of the population as a whole. The existence of high-inclination Neptune trojans points to a capture during planetary migration instead of in situ or collisional formation. The estimated equal number of large L_{5} and L_{4} trojans indicates that there was no gas drag during capture and points to a common capture mechanism for both L_{4} and L_{5} trojans. The capture of Neptune trojans during a migration of the planets occurs via process similar to the chaotic capture of Jupiter trojans in the Nice model. When Uranus and Neptune are near but not in a mean-motion resonance the locations where Uranus passes Neptune can circulate with a period that is in resonance with the libration periods of Neptune trojans. This results in repeated perturbations that increase the libration of existing trojans causing their orbits to become unstable. This process is reversible allowing new trojans to be captured when the planetary migration continues. For high-inclination trojans to be captured the migration must have been slow, or their inclinations must have been acquired previously.

== Colors ==
The first four discovered Neptune trojans have similar colors. They are modestly red, slightly redder than the gray Kuiper belt objects, but not as extremely red as the high-perihelion cold classical Kuiper belt objects. This is similar to the colors of the blue lobe of the centaur color distribution, the Jupiter trojans, the irregular satellites of the gas giants, and possibly the comets, which is consistent with a similar origin of these populations of small Solar System bodies.

The Neptune trojans are too faint to efficiently observe spectroscopically with current technology, which means that a large variety of surface compositions are compatible with the observed colors.

Several Neptunian trojans have been observed to have very-red colors similar to cold classical Kuiper belt objects.

== Naming ==
In 2015, the IAU adopted a new naming scheme for Neptune trojans, which are to be named after Amazons, with no differentiation between objects in L_{4} and L_{5}. The Amazons were an all-female warrior tribe that fought in the Trojan War on the side of the Trojans against the Greeks. As of 2025, the named Neptune trojans are 385571 Otrera (after Otrera, the first Amazonian queen in Greek mythology) and 385695 Clete (after Clete, an Amazon and the attendant to the Amazons' queen Penthesilea, who led the Amazons in the Trojan war).

== Members ==
The amount of high-inclination objects in such a small sample, in which relatively fewer high-inclination Neptune trojans are known due to observational biases, implies that high-inclination trojans may significantly outnumber low-inclination trojans. The ratio of high- to low-inclination Neptune trojans is estimated to be about 4:1. Assuming albedos of 0.05, there are an expected 400+250
−200 Neptune trojans with radii above 40 km in Neptune's L_{4}. This would indicate that large Neptune trojans are 5 to 20 times more abundant than Jupiter trojans, depending on their albedos. There may be relatively fewer smaller Neptune trojans, which could be because these fragment more readily. Large L_{5} trojans are estimated to be as common as large L_{4} trojans.

(612243) 2001 QR322 and 2008 LC18 display significant dynamical instability. This means they could have been captured after planetary migration, but may as well be a long-term member that happens not to be perfectly dynamically stable.

As of September 2023, 35 Neptune trojans are known, of which 28 orbit near the Sun–Neptune L_{4} Lagrangian point 60° ahead of Neptune, 7 orbit near Neptune's L_{5} region 60° behind Neptune, and one orbits on the opposite side of Neptune (L_{3}) but frequently changes location relative to Neptune to L_{4} and L_{5}. These are listed in the following table. It is constructed from the list of Neptune trojans maintained by the IAU Minor Planet Center and with diameters from Sheppard and Trujillo's paper on 2008 LC_{18}, unless otherwise noted.

=== L_{3} Members ===
Name	Prov. designation	Lagrangian point	q (AU)	Q (AU)	e	i (°)	Abs. mag	Diameter (Note: assuming an albedo of 0.05) (km)	Year of identification	Notes	MPC
(316179) 2010 EN65		L_{3}	21.109	40.613	0.310	19.2	7.2	~220	2010	Jumping trojan	MPC

=== L_{4} Members ===
Name	Prov. designation	Lagrangian point	q (AU)	Q (AU)	e	i (°)	Abs. mag	Diameter (Note: assuming an albedo of 0.05) (km)	Year of identification	Notes	MPC
385571 Otrera	2004 UP_{10}	L_{4}	29.318	30.942	0.031	1.4	8.8	~100	2004	First Neptune trojan numbered and named	MPC
385695 Clete	2005 TO_{74}	L_{4}	28.469	31.771	0.052	5.3	8.3	~130	2005	–	MPC
(527604) 2007 VL305		L_{4}	28.130	32.028	0.065	28.1	8.5	~120	2007	–	MPC
(530664) 2011 SO277		L_{4}	29.622	30.503	0.009	9.6	7.8	~170	2016	–	MPC
(530930) 2011 WG157		L_{4}	29.064	30.878	0.025	22.3	7.3	~210	2016	–	MPC
(612243) 2001 QR322		L_{4}	29.404	31.011	0.031	1.3	8.1	~140	2001	First Neptune trojan discovered, unstable Trojan	
(613490) 2006 RJ103		L_{4}	29.077	31.014	0.028	8.2	7.6	~180	2006	–	MPC
2005 TN53		L_{4}	28.092	32.162	0.067	25.0	9.0	~90	2005	First high-inclination trojan discovered	MPC
(666739) 2010 TS191		L_{4}	28.608	31.253	0.048	6.6	8.1	~140	2016	–	MPC
2010 TT191		L_{4}	27.913	32.189	0.070	4.3	7.8	~160	2016	–	MPC
2012 UV177		L_{4}	27.806	32.259	0.072	20.8	9.3	~80	2014	–	MPC
(780605) 2012 UD185		L_{4}	28.794	31.538	0.042	28.4	7.6	~180	2019	–	MPC
2013 RL124		L_{4}	29.366	30.783	0.028	10.1	8.8	~100	2020	–	MPC
2013 RC158		L_{4}	28.611	31.784	0.053	7.5	8.9	~100	2021	–	MPC
2013 TZ187		L_{4}	28.092	32.135	0.066	13.1	8.2	~140	2020	–	MPC
2013 TK227		L_{4}	27.787	32.683	0.081	18.6	9.6	~70	2021	–	MPC
2013 VX30		L_{4}	27.563	32.525	0.087	31.3	8.3	~130	2018	–	MPC
2014 QO441		L_{4}	26.961	33.215	0.101	18.8	8.3	~130	2014	Most eccentric stable Neptune trojan	MPC
2014 QP441		L_{4}	28.137	31.971	0.067	19.4	9.3	~80	2015	–	MPC
2014 RO74		L_{4}	28.426	31.614	0.050	29.5	8.4	~120	2020	–	MPC
2014 SC374		L_{4}	27.038	33.060	0.096	33.7	8.2	~140	2020	–	MPC
2014 UU240		L_{4}	28.661	31.457	0.045	35.8	8.2	~140	2018	–	MPC
2014 YB92		L_{4}	27.309	33.243	0.098	30.8	8.6	~110	2021	–	MPC
2015 RW277		L_{4}	27.742	32.236	0.074	30.8	10.2	~50	2018	–	MPC
2015 VV165		L_{4}	27.513	32.497	0.086	16.9	9.0	~90	2018	–	MPC
2015 VW165		L_{4}	28.488	31.488	0.049	5.0	8.4	~120	2018	–	MPC
2015 VX165		L_{4}	27.612	32.327	0.073	17.2	9.2	~90	2018	–	MPC
2015 VU207		L_{4}	29.211	31.174	0.033	38.9	7.3	~210	2021	Highest known inclination	MPC

=== L_{5} members ===
Name	Prov. designation	Lagrangian point	q (AU)	Q (AU)	e	i (°)	Abs. mag	Diameter (Note: assuming an albedo of 0.05) (km)	Year of identification	Notes	MPC
2004 KV18		L_{5}	24.553	35.851	0.183	13.6	8.7	110	2011	Temporary Neptune trojan	MPC
2008 LC18		L_{5}	27.365	32.479	0.079	27.6	8.2	~130	2008	First L_{5} trojan discovered	MPC
2011 HM102		L_{5}	27.662	32.455	0.083	29.4	8.1	~130	2012	–	MPC
2013 KY18		L_{5}	26.624	34.084	0.124	6.6	6.8	~260	2016	Stability uncertain	MPC
2025 MD138		L_{5}	28.706	31.214	0.042	6.0	7.66	~180	2025	–	MPC
2025 MH348		L_{5}	28.471	31.406	0.049	28.8	8.51	~120	2025	–	MPC
2025 NN80		L_{5}	27.731	32.367	0.077	29.7	7.78	~160	2025	–	MPC

(613100) 2005 TN74 and (309239) 2007 RW10 were thought to be Neptune trojans at the time of their discovery, but further observations have disconfirmed their membership. 2005 TN_{74} is currently thought to be in a 3:5 resonance with Neptune. 2007 RW_{10} is currently following a quasi-satellite loop around Neptune.

== See also ==
- Nice model
- Nice 2 model
- (309239) 2007 RW10, a temporary quasi-satellite of Neptune.
