= (613100) 2005 TN74 =

Astronomical object

(613100) 2005 TN_{74}
Discovery
- Discovered by: Scott S. Sheppard, Chad Trujillo
- Discovery date: 8 October 2005

Designations
- Minor planet category: 3:5 resonant TNO

Orbital characteristics
- Epoch 13 January 2016 (JD 2457400.5)
- Uncertainty parameter 4
- Observation arc: 1805 days (4.94 yr)
- Aphelion: 52.49343 AU (7.852905 Tm)
- Perihelion: 32.11131 AU (4.803784 Tm)
- Semi-major axis: 42.30237 AU (6.328344 Tm)
- Eccentricity: 0.24091
- Orbital period (sidereal): 275.14 yr (100495 d)
- Mean anomaly: 351.03607°
- Mean motion: 0° 0^{m} 12.896^{s} /day
- Inclination: 2.17385°
- Longitude of ascending node: 179.25692°
- Argument of perihelion: 224.79728°
- Earth MOID: 31.1197 AU (4.65544 Tm)
- Jupiter MOID: 27.1241 AU (4.05771 Tm)

Physical characteristics
- Dimensions: 85–240 km
- Absolute magnitude (H): 7.3

(613100) 2005 TN_{74} is a trans-Neptunian object (TNO) (Note: Most SDOs have a perihelion distance greater than 35 AU and an eccentricity of more than 0.3.) in a 3:5 resonance with Neptune. It was discovered by Scott S. Sheppard and Chadwick A. Trujillo in 2005.

It was initially suspected of being a Neptune trojan since the first observations gave it a semi-major axis of 30 AU and an orbital eccentricity of 0.16, but further observations showed it to have a semi-major axis of 42.7 AU, a perihelion of 32.1 AU, and an aphelion of 53.4 AU.

With an absolute magnitude of 7.2, it has an expected diameter in the range of 85 to 240 km.

It has been observed 19 times over four oppositions.
