= 385695 Clete =

Neptune trojan

Discovery
- Discovered by: C. Trujillo; S. S. Sheppard
- Discovery site: Las Campanas Obs.
- Discovery date: 8 October 2005

Designations
- Pronunciation: /ˈkliːtiː/
- Named after: Clete (Greek mythology)
- Alternative designations: 2005 TO_{74}
- Minor planet category: Neptune trojan · L_{4} centaur · distant

Orbital characteristics
- Epoch 27 April 2019 (JD 2458600.5)
- Uncertainty parameter 4
- Observation arc: 10.02 yr (3,661 d)
- Aphelion: 31.575 AU
- Perihelion: 28.534 AU
- Semi-major axis: 30.055 AU
- Eccentricity: 0.0506
- Orbital period (sidereal): 164.77 yr (60,182 d)
- Mean anomaly: 286.36°
- Mean motion: 0° 0^{m} 21.6^{s} / day
- Inclination: 5.2546°
- Longitude of ascending node: 169.40°
- Argument of perihelion: 306.84°
- Neptune MOID: 0.523 AU

Physical characteristics
- Dimensions: 97 km 100 km
- Apparent magnitude: 23.2
- Absolute magnitude (H): 8.3

385695 Clete (provisional designation 2005 TO_{74}) is a Neptune trojan, co-orbital with the ice giant Neptune, approximately 97 kilometers (60 miles) in diameter. It was named after Clete, one of the Amazons from Greek mythology. The minor planet was discovered on 8 October 2005, by American astronomers Scott Sheppard and Chad Trujillo at Las Campanas Observatory in Chile. 23 known Neptune trojans have already been discovered.

== Naming ==
This minor planet was named from Greek mythology after Clete, a member of the Amazons, an all-female warrior tribe that fought in the Trojan War on the side of the Trojans against the Greek. Clete was one of the twelve followers of the Amazonian queen Penthesilea and went looking for her after she went missing during the war. According to the queen's will, Clete sailed to Italy and founded the city of Clete. The official naming citation was published by the Minor Planet Center on 18 May 2019 (M.P.C. 114955). The naming follows the scheme already established with 385571 Otrera, which is to name these Neptune trojans after figures related to the Amazons.

== Orbit and classification ==
Clete orbits near Neptune's L_{4} Lagrangian point about 60° ahead of Neptune and thus has the about same orbital period as Neptune. It orbits the Sun at a distance of 28.5–31.6 AU once every 164 years and 9 months (60,182 days; semi-major axis of 30.06 AU). Its orbit has an eccentricity of 0.05 and an inclination of 5° with respect to the ecliptic.

The Neptune-resonance should keep it more than 19 AU from Neptune for 14,000 years. As of 2016, it is 25.5 AU from Neptune. Clete is located close to the boundary separating stable orbits from unstable ones, and it may be influenced by a secular resonance.

== Physical characteristics ==
=== Diameter ===
The discoverers estimate that Clete has a mean-diameter of 100 kilometers based on a magnitude of 23.2. Based on a generic magnitude-to-diameter conversion, it measures approximately 97 kilometers in diameter using an absolute magnitude of 8.3 with an assumed albedo of 0.09.
