= 2011 HM102 =

Neptune trojan

2011 HM_{102}
- 2011 HM_{102} as seen by the CTIO 4m Blanco Telescope

Discovery
- Discovered by: New Horizons KBO Search
- Discovery site: Las Campanas Obs.
- Discovery date: 29 April 2011 (first observed only)

Designations
- Minor planet category: Neptune trojan; L_{5}; TNO; distant

Orbital characteristics
- Epoch 9 June 2026 (JD 2461200.5)
- Uncertainty parameter 3
- Observation arc: 13.19 yr (4817 d)
- Aphelion: 32.3979 AU
- Perihelion: 27.6739 AU
- Semi-major axis: 30.0359 AU
- Eccentricity: 0.07864
- Orbital period (sidereal): 164.615 yr (60,126 d)
- Mean anomaly: 53.3142°
- Mean motion: 0° 0^{m} 21.24^{s} / day
- Inclination: 29.4240°
- Longitude of ascending node: 101.052°
- Argument of perihelion: 151.019°

Physical characteristics
- Dimensions: 100 km (est. at 0.10)
- Absolute magnitude (H): 8.1

2011 HM_{102} is the ninth Neptune trojan discovered. It was first observed on 29 April 2011, during the New Horizons KBO Search (268) using the Magellan II (Clay) Telescope at Las Campanas Observatory in Chile. It has the same orbital period as Neptune and orbits at the L_{5} Lagrangian point about 60° backwards of Neptune.

== Orbit and classification ==
Neptune trojans are resonant trans-Neptunian objects (TNO) in a 1:1 mean-motion orbital resonance with Neptune. These trojans have a semi-major axis (a) very similar to Neptune's (30.10 AU).

2011 HM_{102} orbits the Sun with a semi-major axis of 30.219 AU at a distance of 27.7–32.8 AU once every 166 years and 1 month (60,675 days). Its orbit has an eccentricity of 0.08 and an inclination of 29° with respect to the ecliptic. Among the first 17 Neptune trojans discovered so far, it is the one with the highest inclination.

== Physical properties ==
=== Diameter and albedo ===
Based on a generic magnitude-to-diameter conversion, it measures approximately 100 kilometers in diameter using an absolute magnitude of 8.1 and an assumed albedo of 0.10. It is an averaged-sized body among the first 17 Neptune trojans discovered so far, which measure between 60 and 200 kilometers (for an absolute magnitude of 9.3–6.6 and an assumed albedo of 0.10).

=== Surface ===
Observations with NIRSpec showed that the spectrum of 2011 HM_{102} does not exhibit clear Triton-like ice tholin features. The surface is likely covered in a thin layer of water ice and CO_{2} ice. Due to the variable color classification of this object, it is suspected that inhomogeneities in the surface composition exist.

== Numbering and naming ==
Due to its orbital uncertainty, this minor planet has not been numbered and its official discoverers have not been determined. If named, it will follow the naming scheme already established with 385571 Otrera, which is to name these objects after figures related to the Amazons, an all-female warrior tribe that fought in the Trojan War on the side of the Trojans against the Greek.

== Exploration ==
In October 2012, 2011 HM_{102} was the closest known object of any kind to the New Horizons spacecraft. In mid- to late 2013, New Horizons passed within 1.2 AU of 2011 HM_{102}, where it would be detectable with one of the onboard instruments. An observation from New Horizons would measure the phase curve of 2011 HM_{102} at phase angles unobtainable from Earth. The New Horizons team eventually decided that they would not target 2011 HM_{102} for observations because the preparations for the Pluto approach took precedence.

== See also ==
- List of New Horizons topics
