= 385571 Otrera =

Neptune trojan

Discovery
- Discovered by: S. S. Sheppard; C. Trujillo
- Discovery site: Las Campanas Obs.
- Discovery date: 16 October 2004

Designations
- Pronunciation: /oʊˈtrɪərə/
- Named after: Otrera (Greek mythology)
- Alternative designations: 2004 UP_{10}
- Minor planet category: Neptune trojan · L_{4} centaur · distant

Orbital characteristics
- Epoch 4 September 2017 (JD 2458000.5)
- Uncertainty parameter 4
- Observation arc: 8.97 yr (3,277 days)
- Aphelion: 30.727 AU
- Perihelion: 29.327 AU
- Semi-major axis: 30.027 AU
- Eccentricity: 0.0233
- Orbital period (sidereal): 164.54 yr (60,099 days)
- Mean anomaly: 355.52°
- Mean motion: 0° 0^{m} 21.6^{s} / day
- Inclination: 1.4334°
- Longitude of ascending node: 34.761°
- Argument of perihelion: 3.5334°

Physical characteristics
- Dimensions: 74 km (est. at 0.10); 100 km
- Apparent magnitude: 23.3
- Absolute magnitude (H): 8.8

385571 Otrera (provisional designation 2004 UP_{10}) is a Neptune trojan leading Neptune's orbit in the outer Solar System. It was discovered by American astronomers Scott Sheppard and Chad Trujillo at Las Campanas Observatory on 16 October 2004. It measures approximately 100 kilometers in diameter and was the second such body to be discovered after 2001 QR322.

== Orbit and classification ==
Neptune trojans are resonant trans-Neptunian objects in a 1:1 mean-motion orbital resonance with Neptune. These trojans have a semi-major axis and an orbital period very similar to Neptune's (30.10 AU; 164.8 years).

Otrera belongs to the L_{4} group, which leads 60° ahead Neptune's orbit. It orbits the Sun with a semi-major axis of 30.027 AU at a distance of 29.3–30.7 AU once every 164 years and 6 months (60,099 days). Its orbit has an eccentricity of 0.02 and an inclination of 1° with respect to the ecliptic.

== Physical characteristics ==
The discoverers estimate that the body has a mean-diameter of 100 kilometers based on a magnitude of 23.3. Based on a generic magnitude-to-diameter conversion, it measures approximately 74 kilometers in diameter using an absolute magnitude of 8.8 and an assumed albedo of 0.10.

== Naming ==
This minor planet was the first Neptune trojan to be named in November 2015. It was named after Otrera, the first Amazonian queen in Greek mythology. The naming scheme is to name these objects after figures related to the Amazons, which was an all-female warrior tribe that fought in the Trojan War on the side of the Trojans against the Greeks.
