= Claimed moons of Earth =

Claims that Earth may have other natural satellites

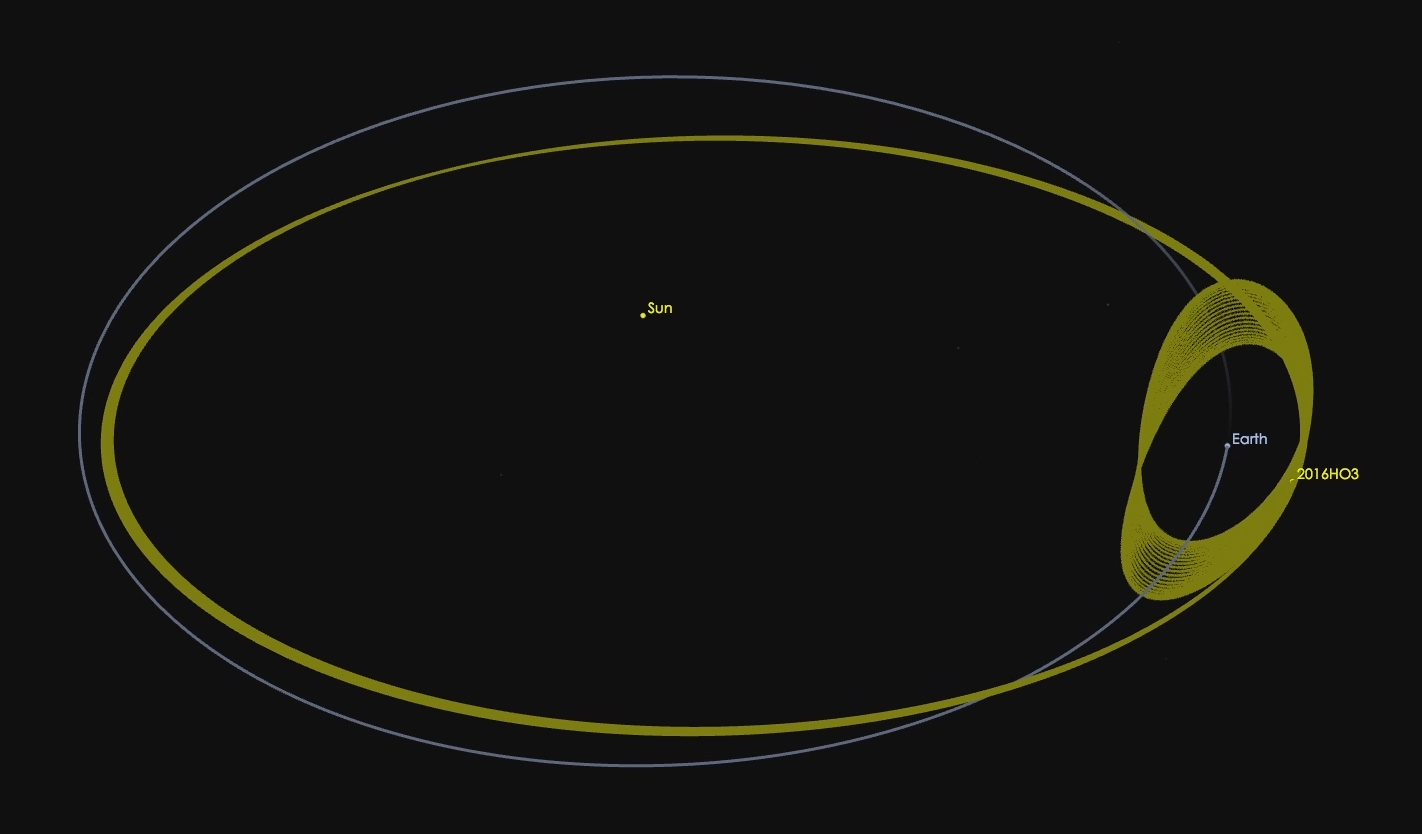
This asteroid's orbit keeps it near the Earth, but not orbiting it in the usual sense. When analyzing its orbit from the perspective of different bodies, the presumed quasi-satellite does seem to have a more stable location near the Earth

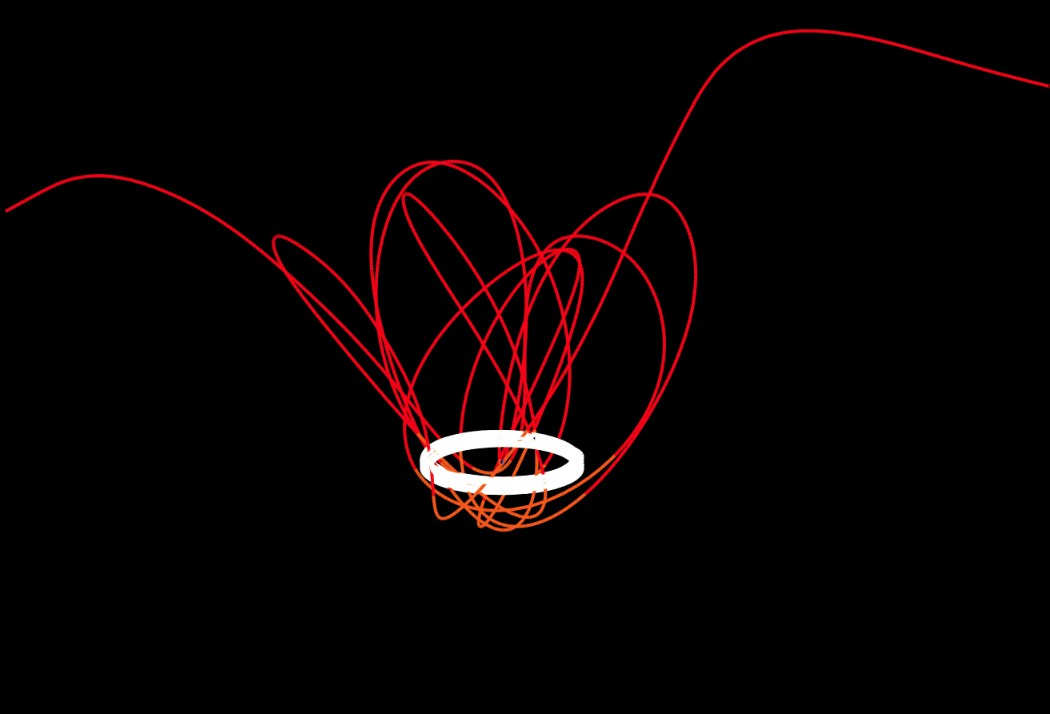
The orbit of 2020 CD3 around the Earth. The white band is the orbit of the Moon.

Claims of the existence of other moons of Earth—that is, of one or more natural satellites with relatively stable orbits of Earth, other than the Moon—have existed for some time. Several candidates have been proposed, but none have been confirmed. Since the 19th century, scientists have made genuine searches for more moons, but the possibility has also been the subject of a number of dubious non-scientific speculations as well as a number of likely hoaxes.

Although the Moon is Earth's only natural satellite, there are a number of near-Earth objects (NEOs) with orbits that are in resonance with Earth. These have been called "second" moons of Earth or "minimoons".

469219 Kamoʻoalewa, an asteroid discovered on 27 April 2016, is possibly the most stable quasi-satellite of Earth. As it orbits the Sun, 469219 Kamoʻoalewa appears to circle around Earth as well. It is too distant to be a true satellite of Earth, but is the best and most stable example of a quasi-satellite, a type of NEO. They appear to orbit a point other than Earth itself, such as the orbital path of the NEO asteroid 3753 Cruithne. Earth trojans, such as 2010 TK7, are NEOs that orbit the Sun (not Earth) on the same orbital path as Earth, and appear to lead or follow Earth along the same orbital path.

Other small natural objects in orbit around the Sun may enter orbit around Earth for a short amount of time, becoming temporary natural satellites. As of 2024, the only confirmed examples have been 2006 RH120 in Earth orbit during 2006 and 2007, 2020 CD3 in Earth orbit between 2018 and 2020, and 2024 PT_{5} in Earth orbit during 2024.

== History ==
=== Petit's moon ===
The first major claim of another moon of Earth was made by French astronomer Frédéric Petit, director of the Toulouse Observatory, who in 1846 announced that he had discovered a second moon in an elliptical orbit around Earth. It was claimed to have also been reported by Lebon and Dassier at Toulouse, and by Larivière at Artenac Observatory, during the early evening of March 21, 1846.

Petit proposed that this second moon had an elliptical orbit, a period of 2 hours 44 minutes, with 3,570 km (2,220 mi) apogee and 11.4 km (7.1 mi) perigee. This claim was soon dismissed by his peers. The 11.4 km (37,000 ft) perigee is similar to the cruising altitude of most modern airliners, and within Earth's atmosphere. Petit published another paper on his 1846 observations in 1861, basing the second moon's existence on perturbations in movements of the actual Moon. This second moon hypothesis was not confirmed either.

Petit's proposed moon became a plot point in Jules Verne's 1870 science fiction novel Around the Moon.

=== Waltemath's moons ===
In 1898, Hamburg scientist Dr. Georg Waltemath announced that he had located a system of tiny moons orbiting Earth. He had begun his search for secondary moons based on the hypothesis that something was gravitationally affecting the Moon's orbit.

Waltemath described one of the proposed moons as being 1,030,000 km (640,000 mi) from Earth, with a diameter of 700 km (430 mi), a 119-day orbital period, and a 177-day synodic period. He also said it did not reflect enough sunlight to be observed without a telescope, unless viewed at certain times, and made several predictions of its next appearances. "Sometimes, it shines at night like the sun but only for an hour or so."

E. Stone Wiggins, a Canadian weather expert, ascribed the cold spring of 1907 to the effect of a second moon, which he said he had first seen in 1882 and had publicized the find in 1884 in the New-York Tribune when he put it forward as probable cause of an anomalous solar eclipse of May of that year. He said it was also probably the "green crescent moon" seen in New Zealand and later in North America in 1886, for periods of less than a half-hour each time. He said this was the "second moon" seen by Waltemath in 1898. Wiggins hypothesized that the second moon had a high carbon atmosphere but could be seen occasionally by its reflected light.

The existence of these objects put forward by Waltemath (and Wiggins) was discredited after the absence of corroborating observation by other members of the scientific community. Especially problematic was a failed prediction that they would be seen in February 1898.

The August 1898 issue of Science mentioned that Waltemath had sent the journal "an announcement of a third moon", which he termed a wahrhafter Wetter- und Magnet-Mond ("real weather and magnet moon"). It was supposedly 746 km (464 mi) in diameter, and at a distance of 427,250 km (265,480 mi) from Earth, closer than the "second moon" that he had seen previously.

=== Other claims ===
In 1918, astrologer Walter Gorn Old, also known as Sepharial, claimed to have confirmed the existence of Waltemath's moon. He named it Lilith. Sepharial claimed that Lilith was a "dark" moon invisible for most of the time, but he claimed to be the first person in history to view it as it crossed the Sun. In 1926, the science journal Die Sterne published the findings of amateur German astronomer W. Spill, who claimed to have successfully viewed a second moon orbiting Earth.

In the late 1960s, John Bagby claimed to have observed over ten small natural satellites of Earth, but this was not confirmed.

=== General surveys ===
William Henry Pickering (1858–1938) studied the possibility of a second moon and made a general search ruling out the possibility of many types of objects by 1903. His 1923 article, "A Meteoric Satellite", in Popular Astronomy resulted in increased searches for small natural satellites by amateur astronomers. Pickering had also proposed the Moon itself had broken off from Earth.

In early 1954, the United States Army's Office of Ordnance Research commissioned Clyde Tombaugh, discoverer of Pluto, to search for near-Earth asteroids. The Army issued a public statement to explain the rationale for this survey. Donald Keyhoe, who was later director of the National Investigations Committee on Aerial Phenomena (NICAP), a UFO research group, said that his Pentagon source had told him that the actual reason for the quickly initiated search was that two near-Earth objects had been picked up on new long-range radar in mid-1953. In May 1954, Keyhoe asserted that the search had been successful, and either one or two objects had been found. At The Pentagon, a general who heard the news reportedly asked whether the satellites were natural or artificial. Tombaugh denied the alleged discovery in a letter to Willy Ley, and the October 1955 issue of Popular Mechanics magazine reported:

Professor Tombaugh is closemouthed about his results. He won't say whether or not any small natural satellites have been discovered. He does say, however, that newspaper reports of 18 months ago announcing the discovery of natural satellites at 400 and 600 miles out are not correct. He adds that there is no connection between the search program and the reports of so-called flying saucers.

At a meteor conference in Los Angeles in 1957, Tombaugh reiterated that his four-year search for natural satellites had been unsuccessful. In 1959, he issued a final report stating that nothing had been found in his search.

=== Modern status ===
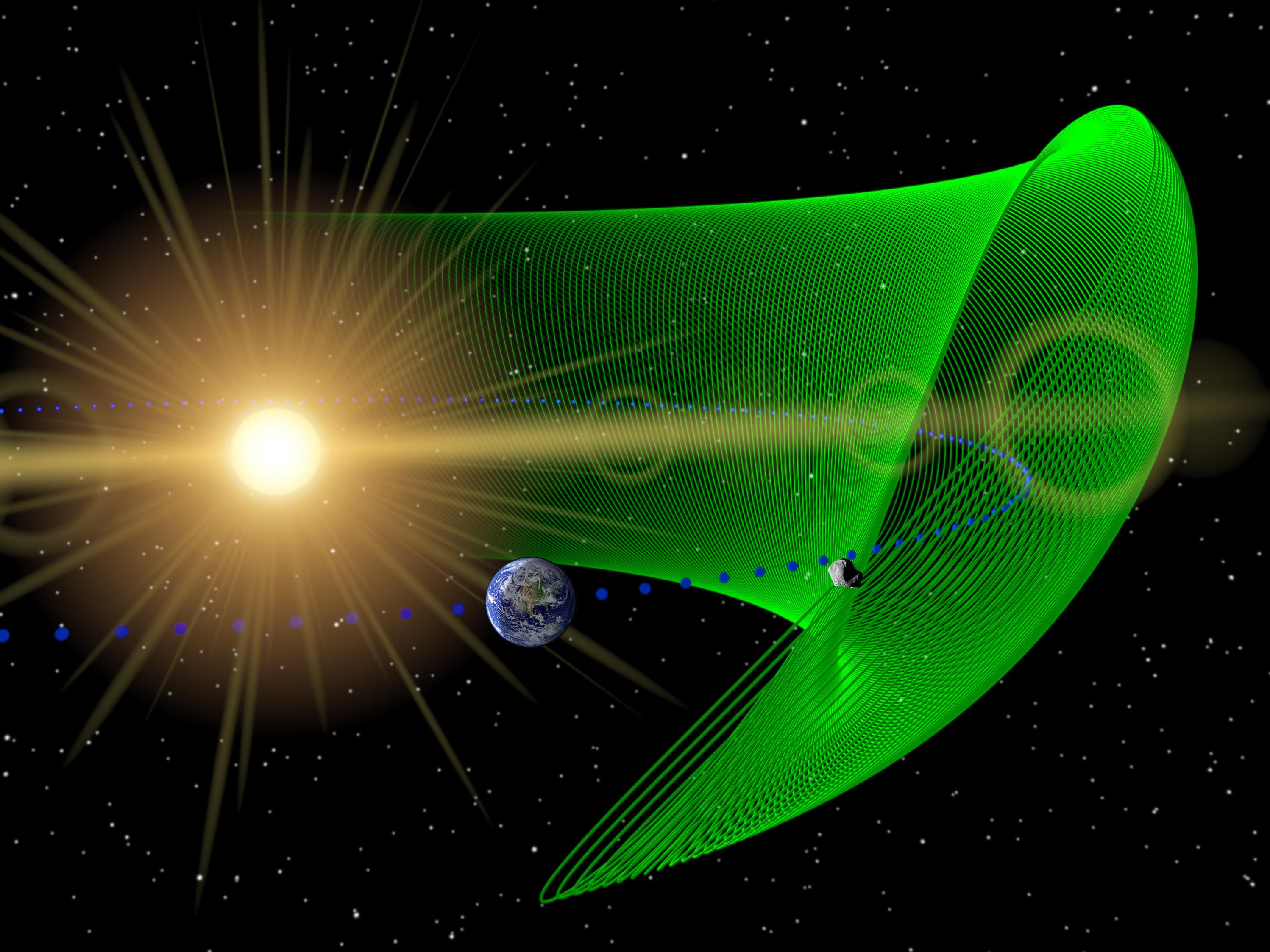
(706765) 2010 TK_{7}'s spiraling path (green) relative to Earth and its orbit (blue dots) over the course of half a tadpole loop; each spiral turn represents a year's motion

It was discovered that small bodies can be temporarily captured, as shown by 2006 RH120, which was in Earth orbit in 2006–2007.

In 2010, the first known Earth trojan was discovered in data from Wide-field Infrared Survey Explorer (WISE) and is currently called (706765) 2010 TK7.

In 2011, planetary scientists Erik Asphaug and Martin Jutzi proposed a model in which a second moon would have existed 4.5 billion years ago, and later impacted the Moon, as a part of the accretion process in the formation of the Moon.

In 2018, it was confirmed two dust clouds orbited Earth at the Moon's L_{4} and L_{5} points, known as the Kordylewski clouds. These were nicknamed "Earth's hidden moons".

The interpretation of some bodies has led to sometimes bold statements in the astronomy press, though often allowing for other interpretations:

Earth has a second moon, of sorts, and could have many others, according to three astronomers who did calculations to describe orbital motions at gravitational balance points in space that temporarily pull asteroids into bizarre orbits near our planet.

— Space.com, 1999

== Co-orbiting objects ==
Although no other moons of Earth have been found to date, there are various types of near-Earth objects in 1:1 resonance with it; they orbit at a similar distance as Earth to the Sun, rather than the planet itself. Their orbits are unstable, and will fall into other resonances or be kicked into other orbits over thousands of years. The orbit of a satellite of Earth fundamentally depends on the gravity of the Earth–Moon system, whereas the orbit of a co-orbiting object would negligibly change if Earth and the Moon were suddenly removed because a quasi-satellite is orbiting the Sun on an Earth-like orbit in the vicinity of Earth.

When observed from Earth, Cruithne follows the yellow path which does not appear to circle the Sun.

Over time co-orbital objects can be close to or switch between being quasi-satellites. 3753 Cruithne was once nicknamed "Earth's second moon", after its discovery in 1986, although it turned out that it actually orbits the Sun, being a case of a co-orbiting object with a horseshoe orbit relative to Earth.

=== Quasi-satellites ===
The oscillating path of asteroid 469219 Kamoʻoalewa viewed from Earth's perspective as it orbits around the Sun. The traced path of Kamoʻoalewa makes it appear as a constant companion of the Earth.

Some co-orbiting objects are called quasi-satellites because of their very close orbit and very similar orbital period with Earth, seemingly orbiting Earth. The known current quasi-satellites of Earth are particularly 469219 Kamoʻoalewa and 164207 Cardea, as well as (277810) 2006 FV35, 2014 OL339, 2013 LX28, 2020 PP1, and 2023 FW13.

=== Earth trojans ===
Earth possesses two known trojans, (706765) 2010 TK7 and (614689) 2020 XL5, which are small Solar System bodies also orbiting the Sun in a 1:1 resonance with Earth, rather than the Earth itself, but staying with the gravitationally stable Earth–Sun leading L_{4} Lagrange point.

Tadpole orbit of 2010 TK_{7} from 1600 to 2500 - relative to Sun and Earth Sun · Earth · 2010 TK_{7}

Animation of 2020 XL_{5}'s orbit from 1600 to 2500 - relative to Sun and Earth Sun · Earth · 2020 XL_{5}

== Temporary satellites ==
Computer models by astrophysicists Mikael Granvik, Jeremie Vaubaillon, and Robert Jedicke suggest that these "temporary satellites" should be quite common; and that "At any given time, there should be at least one natural Earth satellite of 1 meter diameter orbiting the Earth." Such objects would remain in orbit for ten months on average, before returning to solar orbit once more, and so would make relatively easy targets for crewed space exploration. Minimoons were further examined in a study published in the journal Icarus.

It has been proposed that NASA search for temporary natural satellites, and use them for a sample return mission.

=== 1913 ===
The earliest known mention in the scientific literature of a temporarily captured orbiter is by Clarence Chant about the Meteor procession of 9 February 1913:

It would seem that the bodies had been traveling through space, probably in an orbit about the sun, and that on coming near the earth they were promptly captured by it and caused to move about it as a satellite.

Later, in 1916, William Frederick Denning surmised that:

The large meteors which passed over Northern America on 9 February 1913, presented some unique features. The length of their observed flight was about 2,600 miles [4,200 km], and they must have been moving in paths concentric, or nearly concentric, with the earth's surface, so that they temporarily formed new terrestrial satellites.

=== 2006 ===
On 14 September 2006, an object estimated at 5 meters in diameter was discovered in near-polar orbit around Earth. Originally thought to be the third stage (S-IVB) from Apollo 12, it was later determined to be an asteroid and designated as 2006 RH120. The asteroid re-entered solar orbit after 13 months and is expected to return to Earth orbit after 21 years.

=== 2015 ===
In April 2015, an object was discovered orbiting Earth, and initially designated 2015 HP_{116}, but more detailed investigation quickly showed the object to be the Gaia spacecraft, and the object's discovery soon was retracted.

On 3 October 2015, a small object, temporarily designated WT1190F, was found to be orbiting Earth every ~23 days, and had been orbiting since at least late 2009. It impacted Earth on 13 November 2015 at 06:18:21.7 UTC. The impact time is the time of atmospheric entry, when passing the altitude of 100 km (62 mi).

=== 2016 ===
On 8 February 2016, an object, ~0.5 meter in diameter, was discovered orbiting Earth with a period of 5 days and given the temporary designation XC83E0D, and most likely lost. The object was later identified as the lost artificial satellite SR-11A, or possibly its companion SR-11B, which were launched in 1976 and lost in 1979.

On 8 April 2016, an object, given the temporary designation S509356, was discovered with an orbital period of 3.58 days. Although it has the typical area-to-mass ratio (m^{2}/kg) of artificial satellites, it has a color typical of S-type asteroids. It was later identified as the Yuanzheng-1 stage from the launch of Chinese navigation satellites.

=== 2017 ===
On 8 December 2017, the object YX205B9 was discovered with an orbital period of 21 days, on an eccentric orbit taking it from slightly beyond the geocentric satellite ring to almost twice the distance of the Moon. It was later identified as the booster stage from the Chang'e 2 mission.

=== 2018–2020 ===
2020 CD3 was discovered in 2020, and orbited around Earth from 2018 to May 2020.

=== 2024 ===
In August 2024, the ATLAS team discovered 2024 PT_{5}, a NEO likely from the Arjunas asteroid belt. It was expected to be temporarily captured by Earth's gravity and exhibit an orbit with an eccentricity of less than one from 29 September until 25 November 2024.

== List ==
Known and suspected companions of Earth
Name	Eccentricity	Diameter (m)	Discoverer	Date of discovery	Type	Current type
Moon	0.055	3474800	N/A	Prehistory	Natural satellite	Natural satellite
1913 Great Meteor Procession	unknown	unknown	unknown	1913-02-09	Possible temporary satellite	Destroyed
3753 Cruithne	0.515	5000	Duncan Waldron	1986-10-10	Quasi-satellite	Horseshoe orbit
1991 VG	0.053	5–12	Spacewatch	1991-11-06	Temporary satellite	Apollo asteroid
(85770) 1998 UP1	0.345	210–470	Lincoln Lab's ETS	1998-10-18	Horseshoe orbit	Horseshoe orbit
54509 YORP	0.230	124	Lincoln Lab's ETS	2000-08-03	Horseshoe orbit	Horseshoe orbit
2001 GO2	0.168	35–85	Lincoln Lab's ETS	2001-04-13	Possible horseshoe orbit	Possible horseshoe orbit
2002 AA29	0.013	20–100	LINEAR	2002-01-09	Quasi-satellite	Horseshoe orbit
2003 YN107	0.014	10–30	LINEAR	2003-12-20	Quasi-satellite	Horseshoe orbit
164207 Cardea	0.136	160–360	LINEAR	2004-04-13	Quasi-satellite	Quasi-satellite
(277810) 2006 FV35	0.377	140–320	Spacewatch	2006-03-29	Quasi-satellite	Quasi-satellite
2006 JY26	0.083	6–13	Catalina Sky Survey	2006-05-06	Horseshoe orbit	Horseshoe orbit
2006 RH120	0.024	2–3	Catalina Sky Survey	2006-09-13	Temporary satellite	Apollo asteroid
(419624) 2010 SO16	0.075	357	WISE	2010-09-17	Horseshoe orbit	Horseshoe orbit
(706765) 2010 TK7	0.191	150–500	WISE	2010-10-01	Earth trojan	Earth trojan
2013 BS45	0.083	20–40	Spacewatch	2010-01-20	Horseshoe orbit	Horseshoe orbit
2013 LX28	0.452	130–300	Pan-STARRS	2013-06-12	Quasi-satellite temporary	Quasi-satellite temporary
2014 OL339	0.461	70–160	EURONEAR	2014-07-29	Quasi-satellite temporary	Quasi-satellite temporary
2015 SO2	0.108	50–110	Črni Vrh Observatory	2015-09-21	Quasi-satellite	Horseshoe orbit temporary
2015 XX169	0.184	9–22	Mount Lemmon Survey	2015-12-09	Horseshoe orbit temporary	Horseshoe orbit temporary
2015 YA	0.279	9–22	Catalina Sky Survey	2015-12-16	Horseshoe orbit temporary	Horseshoe orbit temporary
2015 YQ1	0.404	7–16	Mount Lemmon Survey	2015-12-19	Horseshoe orbit temporary	Horseshoe orbit temporary
469219 Kamoʻoalewa	0.104	40–100	Pan-STARRS	2016-04-27	Quasi-satellite stable	Quasi-satellite stable
DN160822_03	?	?	?	2016-08-22	Possible temporary satellite	Destroyed
2020 CD3	0.017	1–6	Mount Lemmon Survey	2020-02-15	Temporary satellite	Apollo asteroid
2020 PN1	0.127	10–50	ATLAS-HKO	2020-08-12	Horseshoe orbit temporary	Horseshoe orbit temporary
2020 PP1	0.074	10–20	Pan-STARRS	2020-08-12	Quasi-satellite stable	Horseshoe orbit stable
(614689) 2020 XL5	0.387	1100–1260	Pan-STARRS	2020-12-12	Earth trojan	Earth trojan
2022 NX1	0.025	5–15	Moonbase South Observatory	2020-07-02	Temporary satellite	Apollo asteroid
2022 YG	0.196	16–30	Gennadiy Borisov	2022-12-15	Quasi-satellite	Quasi-satellite
2023 FW13	0.177	10–20	Pan-STARRS	2023-03-28	Quasi-satellite	Quasi-satellite
2024 PT5	0.021	7–13	ATLAS South Africa, Sutherland	2024-08-07	Temporary satellite	Apollo asteroid
2025 PN7	0.107	19–30	Pan-STARRS	2025-08-02	Quasi-satellite	Quasi-satellite

== Literature ==
- The writer Jules Verne learned of Petit's 1861 proposal and made use of the idea in his 1870 novel, Around the Moon. This fictional moon was not, however, exactly based on the Toulouse observations or Petit's proposal at a technical level, and so the orbit suggested by Verne was mathematically incorrect. Petit died in 1865, and so was not alive to offer a response to Verne's fictional moon.
- Seun Ayoade's science-fiction adventure Double Bill has a twin-mooned parallel Earth.
- Eleanor Cameron's Mushroom Planet novels for children (starting with the 1954 The Wonderful Flight to the Mushroom Planet) are set on a tiny, habitable second moon called Basidium in an invisible orbit 50,000 miles (80,000 km) from Earth. There is an even smaller moon (a captured M-type asteroid) called Lepton orbiting at only 1,000 miles (1,600 km).
- The 1956 Tom Swift, Jr. juvenile novel, Tom Swift on the Phantom Satellite, features a new moon entering Earth orbit at 50,000 miles (80,000 km) altitude. A 1963 sequel, Tom Swift and the Asteroid Pirates, has the moon Nestria, also called Little Luna, which was originally an asteroid and was moved into Earth orbit at 50,000 miles (80,000 km) altitude. It was claimed for the United States and a research base was established there by Swift Enterprises.
- Samuel R. Delany's 1975 novel Dhalgren features an Earth that mysteriously acquires a second moon named George.
- In Haruki Murakami's 2011 novel 1Q84, a second moon, irregularly shaped and green in color, is visible to some characters in the story.

== See also ==
- Counter-Earth – Hypothetical planet on the other side of the Sun from Earth
- Kordylewski cloud – Concentrations of dust in the Earth–Moon system
- Lilith (fictitious moon) – Non-scientific hypothetical objects – second, invisible moon in astrology
- 6Q0B44E – Object in high Earth orbit
- List of hypothetical Solar System objects – Hypothetical bodies around the Solar System
- Space debris – Pollution around Earth by defunct artificial objects
- Natural satellite – Astronomical body that orbits a planet
