= Earth trojan =

Asteroid with which Earth shares its orbit around the Sun

The orbit of 2010 TK7, the first Earth trojan to be discovered (left). Lagrange points L_{4} and L_{5}. Lines around the blue triangles represent tadpole orbits (right)

An Earth trojan is an asteroid that orbits the Sun in the vicinity of the Earth–Sun Lagrange points L_{4} (leading 60°) or L_{5} (trailing 60°), thus having an orbit similar to Earth's. Only two Earth trojans have so far been discovered. The name "trojan" was first used in 1906 for the Jupiter trojans, the asteroids that were observed near the Lagrangian points of Jupiter's orbit.

== Members ==
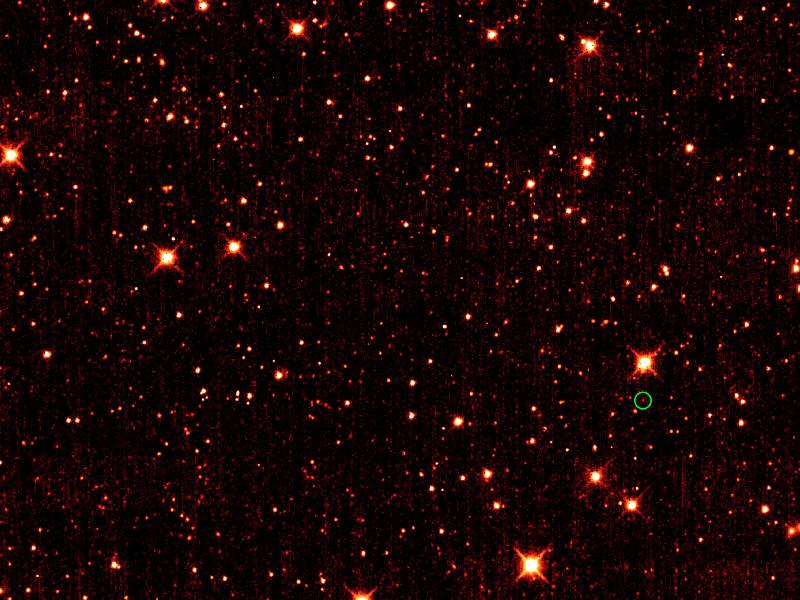
2010 TK7, one of the two known Earth trojans, is located at the lower right, encircled by a small green ring.

=== L_{4} (leading) ===
- (706765) 2010 TK7: A 300-metre diameter asteroid, discovered using the Wide-field Infrared Survey Explorer (WISE) satellite on 1 October 2010.
- (614689) 2020 XL5: Discovered by the Pan-STARRS survey on 12 December 2020 and later recognised as an Earth trojan in January 2021. It is 1.2 km in diameter.

=== L_{5} (trailing) ===
- No L_{5} trojans of Earth are known.

== Searches ==
An Earth-based search for L_{5} objects was conducted in 1994, covering 0.35 square degrees of sky, under poor observing conditions. That search failed to detect any objects:

"The limiting sensitivity of this search was magnitude ~22.8, corresponding to C-type asteroids ~350 m in diameter, or S-type asteroids ~175 m in diameter."

In February 2017, the OSIRIS-REx spacecraft performed a search from within the L_{4} region on its way to asteroid Bennu. No additional Earth trojans were discovered.

In April 2017, the Hayabusa2 spacecraft searched the L_{5} region while proceeding to asteroid Ryugu, but did not find any asteroids there.

== Giant-impact hypothesis ==
A hypothetical planet-sized Earth trojan the size of Mars, given the name Theia, is thought by proponents of the giant-impact hypothesis to be the origin of the Moon. The hypothesis states that the Moon formed after Earth and Theia collided, showering material from the two planets into space. This material eventually accreted around Earth and into a single orbiting body, the Moon.

At the same time, material from Theia mixed and combined with Earth's mantle and core. Supporters of the giant-impact hypothesis theorise that Earth's large core in relation to its overall volume is a result of this combination.

== Continuing interest in near-Earth asteroids ==
Astronomy continues to retain interest in the subject. A publication describes these reasons thus:

The survival to the present day of an ancient [Earth Trojan] population is reasonably assured provided Earth's orbit itself was not strongly perturbed since its formation. It is therefore pertinent to consider that modern theoretical models of planet formation find strongly chaotic orbital evolution during the final stages of assembly of the terrestrial planets and the Earth–Moon system.

Such chaotic evolution may at first sight appear unfavorable to the survival of a primordial population of [Earth trojans]. However, during and after the chaotic assembly of the terrestrial planets, it is likely that a residual planetesimal population, of a few percent of Earth's mass, was present and helped to damp the orbital eccentricities and inclinations of the terrestrial planets to their observed low values, as well as to provide the so-called "late veneer" of accreting planetesimals to account for the abundance patterns of the highly siderophile elements in Earth's mantle.

Such a residual planetesimal population would also naturally lead to a small fraction trapped in the Earth's Trojan zones as Earth's orbit circularized. In addition to potentially hosting an ancient, long-term stable population of asteroids, Earth's Trojan regions also provide transient traps for NEOs that originate from more distal reservoirs of small bodies in the solar system like the main asteroid belt.

== Other companions of Earth ==
Several other small objects have been found on an orbital path associated with Earth. Although these objects are in 1:1 orbital resonance, they are not Earth trojans, because they do not librate around a definite Sun–Earth Lagrangian point, neither L_{4} nor L_{5}.

Earth has another noted companion, asteroid 3753 Cruithne. About 5 km across, it has a peculiar type of orbital resonance called an overlapping horseshoe, and is probably only a temporary liaison.

469219 Kamoʻoalewa, an asteroid discovered on 27 April 2016, is possibly the most stable quasi-satellite of Earth.

Known and suspected companions of Earth
Name	Eccentricity	Diameter (m)	Discoverer	Date of discovery	Type	Current type
Moon	0.055	3474800	N/A	Prehistory	Natural satellite	Natural satellite
1913 Great Meteor Procession	unknown	unknown	unknown	1913-02-09	Possible temporary satellite	Destroyed
3753 Cruithne	0.515	5000	Duncan Waldron	1986-10-10	Quasi-satellite	Horseshoe orbit
1991 VG	0.053	5–12	Spacewatch	1991-11-06	Temporary satellite	Apollo asteroid
(85770) 1998 UP1	0.345	210–470	Lincoln Lab's ETS	1998-10-18	Horseshoe orbit	Horseshoe orbit
54509 YORP	0.230	124	Lincoln Lab's ETS	2000-08-03	Horseshoe orbit	Horseshoe orbit
2001 GO2	0.168	35–85	Lincoln Lab's ETS	2001-04-13	Possible horseshoe orbit	Possible horseshoe orbit
2002 AA29	0.013	20–100	LINEAR	2002-01-09	Quasi-satellite	Horseshoe orbit
2003 YN107	0.014	10–30	LINEAR	2003-12-20	Quasi-satellite	Horseshoe orbit
164207 Cardea	0.136	160–360	LINEAR	2004-04-13	Quasi-satellite	Quasi-satellite
(277810) 2006 FV35	0.377	140–320	Spacewatch	2006-03-29	Quasi-satellite	Quasi-satellite
2006 JY26	0.083	6–13	Catalina Sky Survey	2006-05-06	Horseshoe orbit	Horseshoe orbit
2006 RH120	0.024	2–3	Catalina Sky Survey	2006-09-13	Temporary satellite	Apollo asteroid
(419624) 2010 SO16	0.075	357	WISE	2010-09-17	Horseshoe orbit	Horseshoe orbit
(706765) 2010 TK7	0.191	150–500	WISE	2010-10-01	Earth trojan	Earth trojan
2013 BS45	0.083	20–40	Spacewatch	2010-01-20	Horseshoe orbit	Horseshoe orbit
2013 LX28	0.452	130–300	Pan-STARRS	2013-06-12	Quasi-satellite temporary	Quasi-satellite temporary
2014 OL339	0.461	70–160	EURONEAR	2014-07-29	Quasi-satellite temporary	Quasi-satellite temporary
2015 SO2	0.108	50–110	Črni Vrh Observatory	2015-09-21	Quasi-satellite	Horseshoe orbit temporary
2015 XX169	0.184	9–22	Mount Lemmon Survey	2015-12-09	Horseshoe orbit temporary	Horseshoe orbit temporary
2015 YA	0.279	9–22	Catalina Sky Survey	2015-12-16	Horseshoe orbit temporary	Horseshoe orbit temporary
2015 YQ1	0.404	7–16	Mount Lemmon Survey	2015-12-19	Horseshoe orbit temporary	Horseshoe orbit temporary
469219 Kamoʻoalewa	0.104	40–100	Pan-STARRS	2016-04-27	Quasi-satellite stable	Quasi-satellite stable
DN160822_03	?	?	?	2016-08-22	Possible temporary satellite	Destroyed
2020 CD3	0.017	1–6	Mount Lemmon Survey	2020-02-15	Temporary satellite	Apollo asteroid
2020 PN1	0.127	10–50	ATLAS-HKO	2020-08-12	Horseshoe orbit temporary	Horseshoe orbit temporary
2020 PP1	0.074	10–20	Pan-STARRS	2020-08-12	Quasi-satellite stable	Horseshoe orbit stable
(614689) 2020 XL5	0.387	1100–1260	Pan-STARRS	2020-12-12	Earth trojan	Earth trojan
2022 NX1	0.025	5–15	Moonbase South Observatory	2020-07-02	Temporary satellite	Apollo asteroid
2022 YG	0.196	16–30	Gennadiy Borisov	2022-12-15	Quasi-satellite	Quasi-satellite
2023 FW13	0.177	10–20	Pan-STARRS	2023-03-28	Quasi-satellite	Quasi-satellite
2024 PT5	0.021	7–13	ATLAS South Africa, Sutherland	2024-08-07	Temporary satellite	Apollo asteroid
2025 PN7	0.107	19–30	Pan-STARRS	2025-08-02	Quasi-satellite	Quasi-satellite
2026 QQ8	0.0261776	< 10	Krisztián Sárneczky	2026-08-20	Temporary satellite	Temporary satellite

== Gallery ==
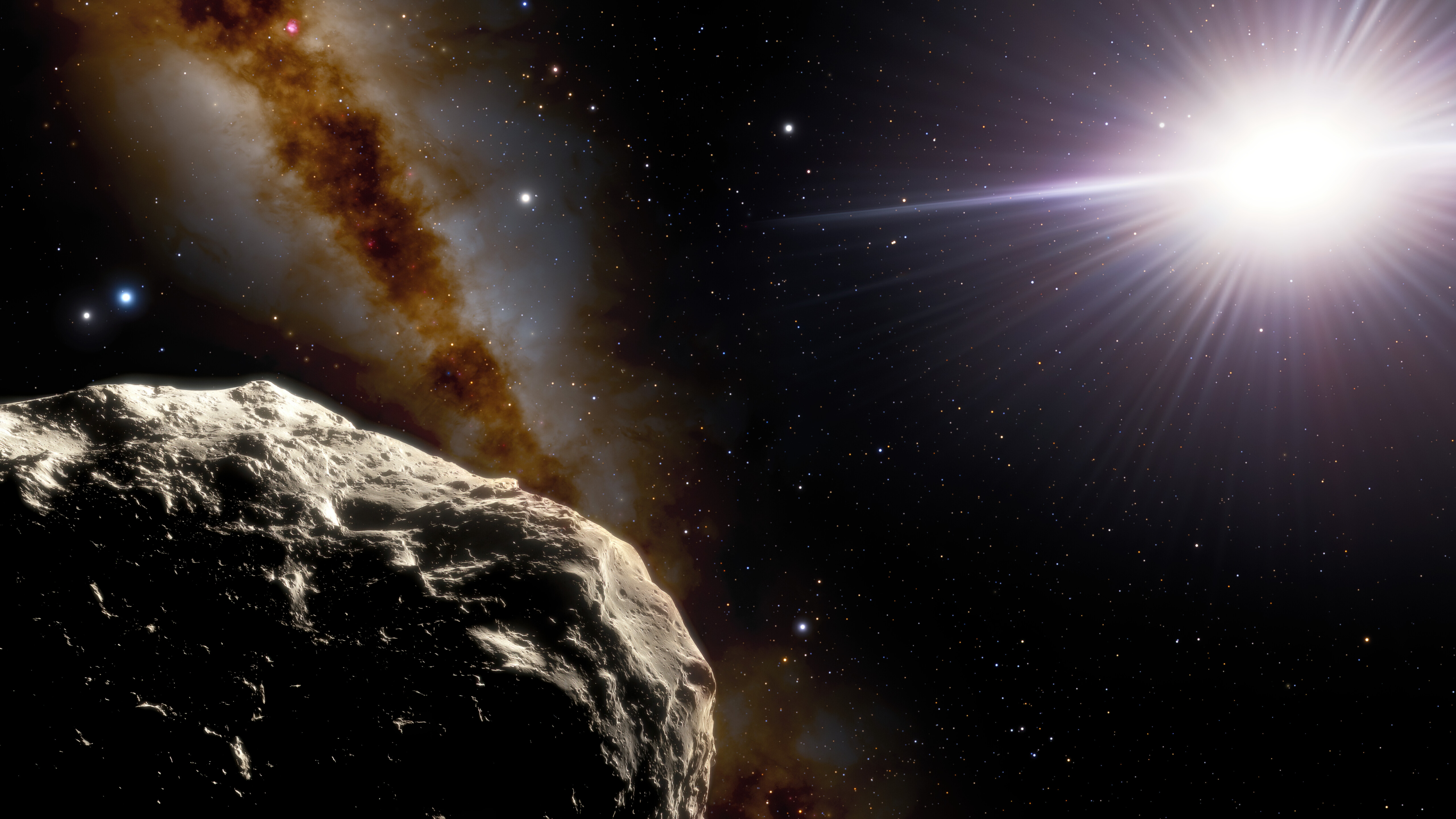
Illustration of trojan asteroid 2020 XL_{5}

== See also ==
- 2003 YN107
- 2006 RH120
- 3753 Cruithne
- 6Q0B44E
- Claimed moons of Earth
- Kordylewski cloud
- Natural satellite
- Quasi-satellite
- Theia / giant-impact hypothesis
