= Horseshoe orbit =

Type of co-orbital motion of a small orbiting body relative to a larger orbiting body

The horseshoe orbit of (419624) 2010 SO16 around the Earth-Sun system over 900 years

The horseshoe orbit viewed from a heliocentric reference frame co-rotating with the Earth. The vertical looping is due to inclination of the smaller body's orbit to that of the Earth, and would be absent if both orbited in the same plane.

The horseshoe orbit from a heliocentric non-rotating reference frame.

Sun · Earth · 2010 SO16

In celestial mechanics, a horseshoe orbit is a type of co-orbital motion of a small orbiting body relative to a larger orbiting body. The osculating (instantaneous) orbital period of the smaller body remains very near that of the larger body, and if its orbit is a little more eccentric than that of the larger body, during every period it appears to trace an ellipse around a point on the larger object's orbit. However, the loop is not closed but drifts forward or backward so that the point it circles will appear to move smoothly along the larger body's orbit over a long period of time. When the object approaches the larger body closely at either end of its trajectory, its apparent direction changes. Over an entire cycle the center traces the outline of a horseshoe, with the larger body between the 'horns'.

Asteroids in horseshoe orbits with respect to Earth include 54509 YORP, 2002 AA29, 2010 SO16, 2015 SO2 and possibly 2001 GO2. A broader definition includes 3753 Cruithne, which can be said to be in a compound and/or transition orbit, or (85770) 1998 UP1 and 2003 YN107. By 2016, 12 horseshoe librators of Earth have been discovered.

Saturn's moons Epimetheus and Janus occupy horseshoe orbits with respect to each other (in their case, there is no repeated looping: each one traces a full horseshoe with respect to the other).

== Explanation of horseshoe orbital cycle ==
=== Background ===
The following explanation relates to an asteroid which is in such an orbit around the Sun, and is also affected by the Earth.

The asteroid is in almost the same solar orbit as Earth. Both take approximately one year to orbit the Sun.

It is also necessary to grasp two rules of orbit dynamics:

1. A body closer to the Sun completes an orbit more quickly than a body farther away.
2. If a body accelerates along its orbit, its orbit moves outwards from the Sun. If it decelerates, the orbital radius decreases.

The horseshoe orbit arises because the gravitational attraction of the Earth changes the shape of the elliptical orbit of the asteroid. The shape changes are very small but result in significant changes relative to the Earth.

The horseshoe becomes apparent only when mapping the movement of the asteroid relative to both the Sun and the Earth. The asteroid always orbits the Sun in the same direction. However, it goes through a cycle of catching up with the Earth and falling behind, so that its movement relative to both the Sun and the Earth traces a shape like the outline of a horseshoe.

=== Stages of the orbit ===
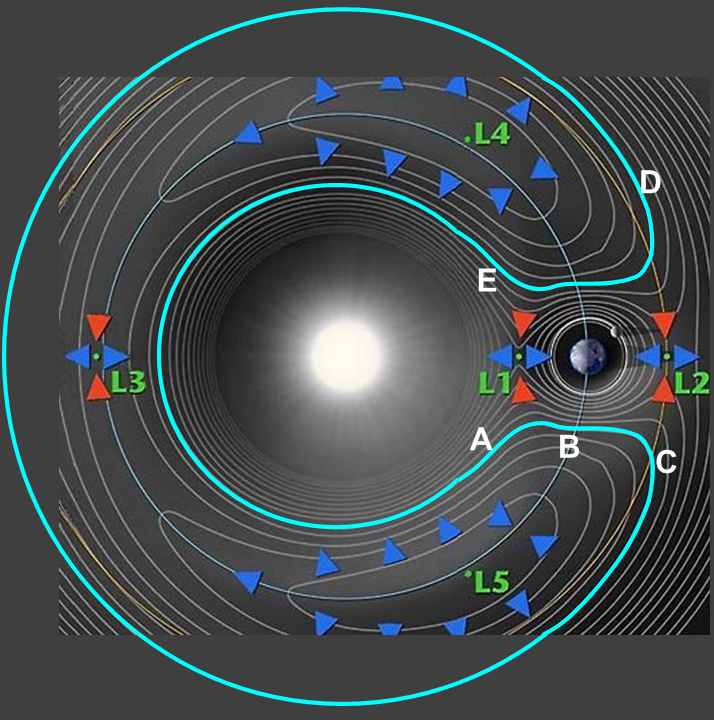
Figure 1. Plan showing possible orbits along gravitational contours. In this image, the Earth (and the whole image with it) is rotating counterclockwise around the Sun.

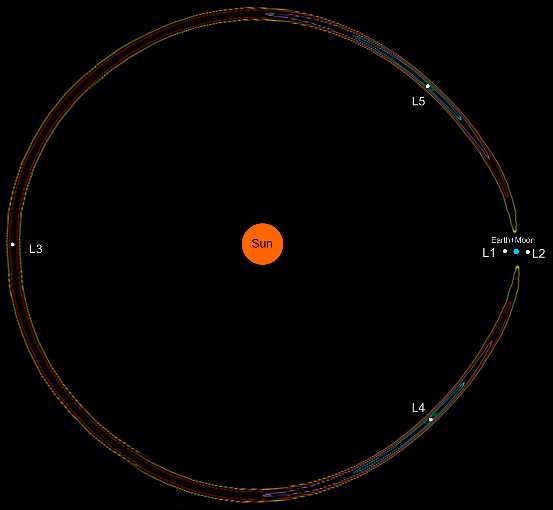
Figure 2. Thin horseshoe orbit

Starting at point A, on the inner ring between L_{5} and Earth, the satellite is orbiting faster than the Earth and is on its way toward passing between the Earth and the Sun. But Earth's gravity exerts an outward accelerating force, pulling the satellite into a higher orbit which (per Kepler's third law) decreases its angular speed.

When the satellite gets to point B, it is traveling at the same speed as Earth. Earth's gravity is still accelerating the satellite along the orbital path, and continues to pull the satellite into a higher orbit. Eventually, at Point C, the satellite reaches a high and slow enough orbit such that it starts to lag behind Earth. It then spends the next century or more appearing to drift 'backwards' around the orbit when viewed relative to the Earth. Its orbit around the Sun still takes only slightly more than one Earth year. Given enough time, the Earth and the satellite will be on opposite sides of the Sun.

Eventually the satellite comes around to point D where Earth's gravity is now reducing the satellite's orbital velocity. This causes it to fall into a lower orbit, which actually increases the angular speed of the satellite around the Sun. This continues until point E where the satellite's orbit is now lower and faster than Earth's orbit, and it begins moving out ahead of Earth. Over the next few centuries it completes its journey back to point A.

On the longer term, asteroids can transfer between horseshoe orbits and quasi-satellite orbits. Quasi-satellites aren't gravitationally bound to their planet, but appear to circle it in a retrograde direction as they circle the Sun with the same orbital period as the planet. By 2016, orbital calculations showed that four of Earth's horseshoe librators and all five of its then known quasi-satellites repeatedly transfer between horseshoe and quasi-satellite orbits.

=== Energy viewpoint ===
A somewhat different, but equivalent, view of the situation may be noted by considering conservation of energy. It is a theorem of classical mechanics that a body moving in a time-independent potential field will have its total energy, E = T + V, conserved, where E is total energy, T is kinetic energy (always non-negative) and V is potential energy, which is negative. It is apparent then, since V = -GM/R near a gravitating body of mass M and orbital radius R, that seen from a stationary frame, V will be increasing for the region behind M, and decreasing for the region in front of it. However, orbits with lower total energy have shorter periods, and so a body moving slowly on the forward side of a planet will lose energy, fall into a shorter-period orbit, and thus slowly move away, or be "repelled" from it. Bodies moving slowly on the trailing side of the planet will gain energy, rise to a higher, slower, orbit, and thereby fall behind, similarly repelled. Thus a small body can move back and forth between a leading and a trailing position, never approaching too close to the planet that dominates the region.

== Tadpole orbit ==
An example of a tadpole orbit Sun · Earth · 2010 TK7

See also Trojan (celestial body).

Figure 1 above shows shorter orbits around the Lagrangian points L_{4} and L_{5} (i.e. the lines close to the blue triangles). These are called tadpole orbits and can be explained in a similar way, except that the asteroid's distance from the Earth does not oscillate as far as the L_{3} point on the other side of the Sun. As it moves closer to or farther from the Earth, the changing pull of Earth's gravitational field causes it to accelerate or decelerate, causing a change in its orbit known as libration.

An example of a tadpole orbit is Polydeuces, a small moon of Saturn which librates around the trailing L_{5} point relative to a larger moon, Dione. In relation to the orbit of Earth, the 300-metre-diameter (980-foot) asteroid 2010 TK7 is in a tadpole orbit around the leading L_{4} point. 2020 VT1 follows a temporary horseshoe orbit with respect to Mars.

Known and suspected companions of Earth
Name	Eccentricity	Diameter (m)	Discoverer	Date of discovery	Type	Current type
Moon	0.055	3474800	N/A	Prehistory	Natural satellite	Natural satellite
1913 Great Meteor Procession	unknown	unknown	unknown	1913-02-09	Possible temporary satellite	Destroyed
3753 Cruithne	0.515	5000	Duncan Waldron	1986-10-10	Quasi-satellite	Horseshoe orbit
1991 VG	0.053	5–12	Spacewatch	1991-11-06	Temporary satellite	Apollo asteroid
(85770) 1998 UP1	0.345	210–470	Lincoln Lab's ETS	1998-10-18	Horseshoe orbit	Horseshoe orbit
54509 YORP	0.230	124	Lincoln Lab's ETS	2000-08-03	Horseshoe orbit	Horseshoe orbit
2001 GO2	0.168	35–85	Lincoln Lab's ETS	2001-04-13	Possible horseshoe orbit	Possible horseshoe orbit
2002 AA29	0.013	20–100	LINEAR	2002-01-09	Quasi-satellite	Horseshoe orbit
2003 YN107	0.014	10–30	LINEAR	2003-12-20	Quasi-satellite	Horseshoe orbit
164207 Cardea	0.136	160–360	LINEAR	2004-04-13	Quasi-satellite	Quasi-satellite
(277810) 2006 FV35	0.377	140–320	Spacewatch	2006-03-29	Quasi-satellite	Quasi-satellite
2006 JY26	0.083	6–13	Catalina Sky Survey	2006-05-06	Horseshoe orbit	Horseshoe orbit
2006 RH120	0.024	2–3	Catalina Sky Survey	2006-09-13	Temporary satellite	Apollo asteroid
(419624) 2010 SO16	0.075	357	WISE	2010-09-17	Horseshoe orbit	Horseshoe orbit
(706765) 2010 TK7	0.191	150–500	WISE	2010-10-01	Earth trojan	Earth trojan
2013 BS45	0.083	20–40	Spacewatch	2010-01-20	Horseshoe orbit	Horseshoe orbit
2013 LX28	0.452	130–300	Pan-STARRS	2013-06-12	Quasi-satellite temporary	Quasi-satellite temporary
2014 OL339	0.461	70–160	EURONEAR	2014-07-29	Quasi-satellite temporary	Quasi-satellite temporary
2015 SO2	0.108	50–110	Črni Vrh Observatory	2015-09-21	Quasi-satellite	Horseshoe orbit temporary
2015 XX169	0.184	9–22	Mount Lemmon Survey	2015-12-09	Horseshoe orbit temporary	Horseshoe orbit temporary
2015 YA	0.279	9–22	Catalina Sky Survey	2015-12-16	Horseshoe orbit temporary	Horseshoe orbit temporary
2015 YQ1	0.404	7–16	Mount Lemmon Survey	2015-12-19	Horseshoe orbit temporary	Horseshoe orbit temporary
469219 Kamoʻoalewa	0.104	40–100	Pan-STARRS	2016-04-27	Quasi-satellite stable	Quasi-satellite stable
DN160822_03	?	?	?	2016-08-22	Possible temporary satellite	Destroyed
2020 CD3	0.017	1–6	Mount Lemmon Survey	2020-02-15	Temporary satellite	Apollo asteroid
2020 PN1	0.127	10–50	ATLAS-HKO	2020-08-12	Horseshoe orbit temporary	Horseshoe orbit temporary
2020 PP1	0.074	10–20	Pan-STARRS	2020-08-12	Quasi-satellite stable	Horseshoe orbit stable
(614689) 2020 XL5	0.387	1100–1260	Pan-STARRS	2020-12-12	Earth trojan	Earth trojan
2022 NX1	0.025	5–15	Moonbase South Observatory	2020-07-02	Temporary satellite	Apollo asteroid
2022 YG	0.196	16–30	Gennadiy Borisov	2022-12-15	Quasi-satellite	Quasi-satellite
2023 FW13	0.177	10–20	Pan-STARRS	2023-03-28	Quasi-satellite	Quasi-satellite
2024 PT5	0.021	7–13	ATLAS South Africa, Sutherland	2024-08-07	Temporary satellite	Apollo asteroid
2025 PN7	0.107	19–30	Pan-STARRS	2025-08-02	Quasi-satellite	Quasi-satellite

== See also ==
- Box orbit – Type of gravitational orbit seen in triaxial systems
- Co-orbital moon – Configuration of two or more astronomical objects
- Halo orbit – Periodic, three-dimensional orbit
- Interplanetary Transport Network – Low-energy trajectories in the Solar System
- Lissajous orbit – Quasi-periodic orbital trajectory
- Natural satellite – Astronomical body that orbits a planet
- Quasi-satellite – Type of satellite in sync with another orbit
- Temporary satellite – Object captured by a planet for a while
