= 2025 PN7 =

Small near-Earth asteroid

2025 PN_{7}
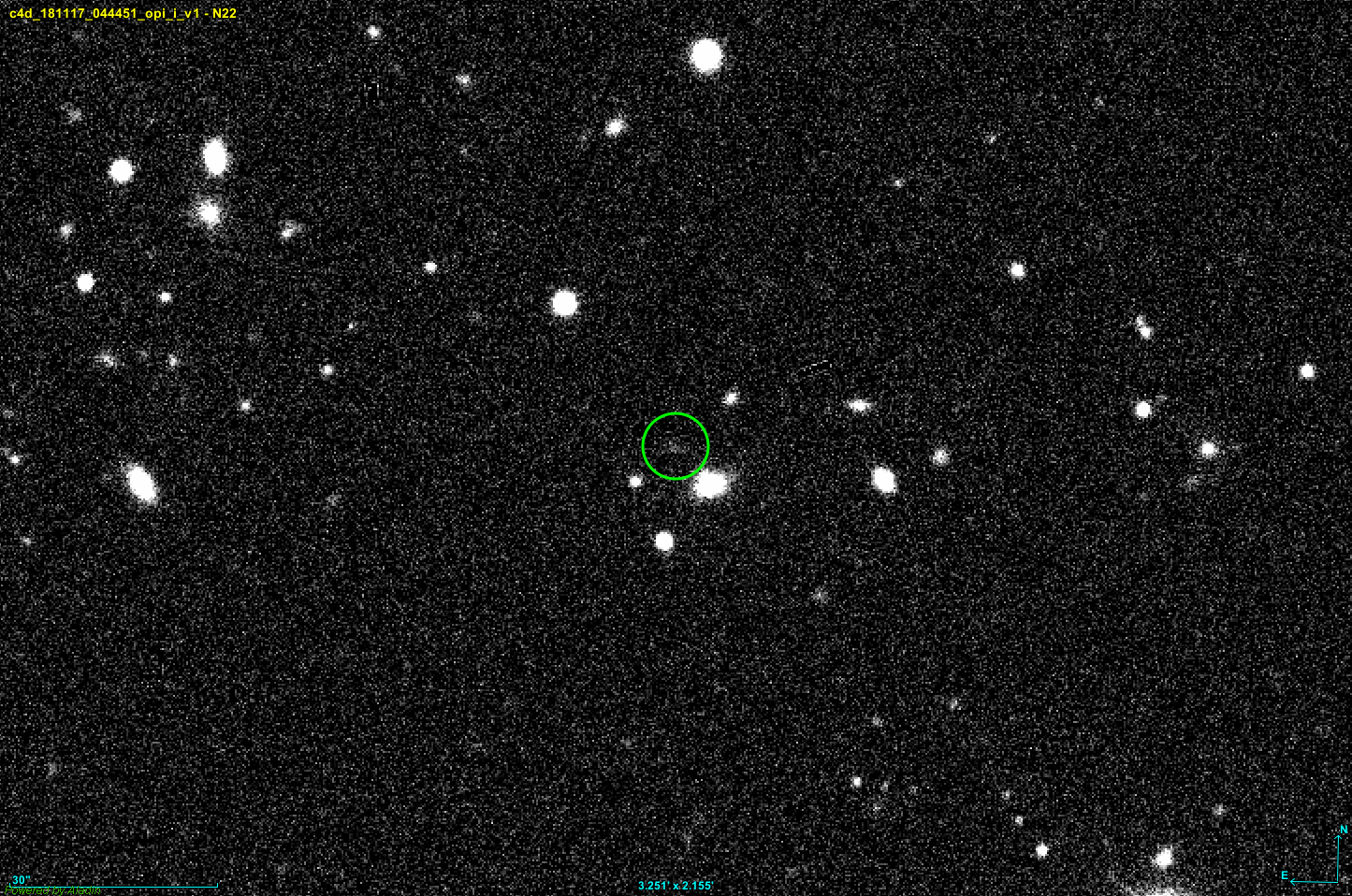
- 2025 PN_{7} photographed by the Dark Energy Survey on 17 November 2018

Discovery
- Discovered by: Pan-STARRS 1
- Discovery site: Haleakalā Observatory
- Discovery date: 2 August 2025

Designations
- Minor planet category: NEO (Apollo · Arjuna)

Orbital characteristics
- Epoch 21 November 2025 (JD 2461000.5)
- Uncertainty parameter 0
- Observation arc: 11.72 yr (4,279 days)
- Earliest precovery date: 11 December 2013
- Aphelion: 1.109 AU
- Perihelion: 0.893 AU
- Semi-major axis: 1.001 AU
- Eccentricity: 0.108
- Orbital period (sidereal): 1.002 yr (365.799 d)
- Mean anomaly: 217.230°
- Mean motion: 0° 59^{m} 2.925^{s} / day
- Inclination: 1.98°
- Longitude of ascending node: 112.25°
- Argument of perihelion: 79.888°
- Earth MOID: 0.00282 AU (422,000 km)

Physical characteristics
- Mean diameter: ~19 m
- Absolute magnitude (H): 26.36±0.30

2025 PN_{7} is a small near-Earth asteroid and the most recently discovered quasi-satellite of Earth. First observed on 2 August 2025 by the Pan-STARRS 1 telescope at Haleakalā Observatory in Hawaii, 2025 PN_{7} is a member of the Arjuna asteroid group—near-Earth objects with orbits very similar to Earth's.

== Discovery ==
2025 PN_{7} was discovered on 2 August 2025 by the Pan-STARRS 1 telescope at Haleakalā Observatory in Hawaii, United States. The asteroid was formally announced by the Minor Planet Center (MPC) in a Minor Planet Electronic Circular on 29 August.

Upon discovery, the asteroid was first given the temporary internal designation P12dHmP. Once it was formally announced on 29 August, it was assigned the provisional designation 2025 PN_{7} by the MPC.

== Orbit and classification ==
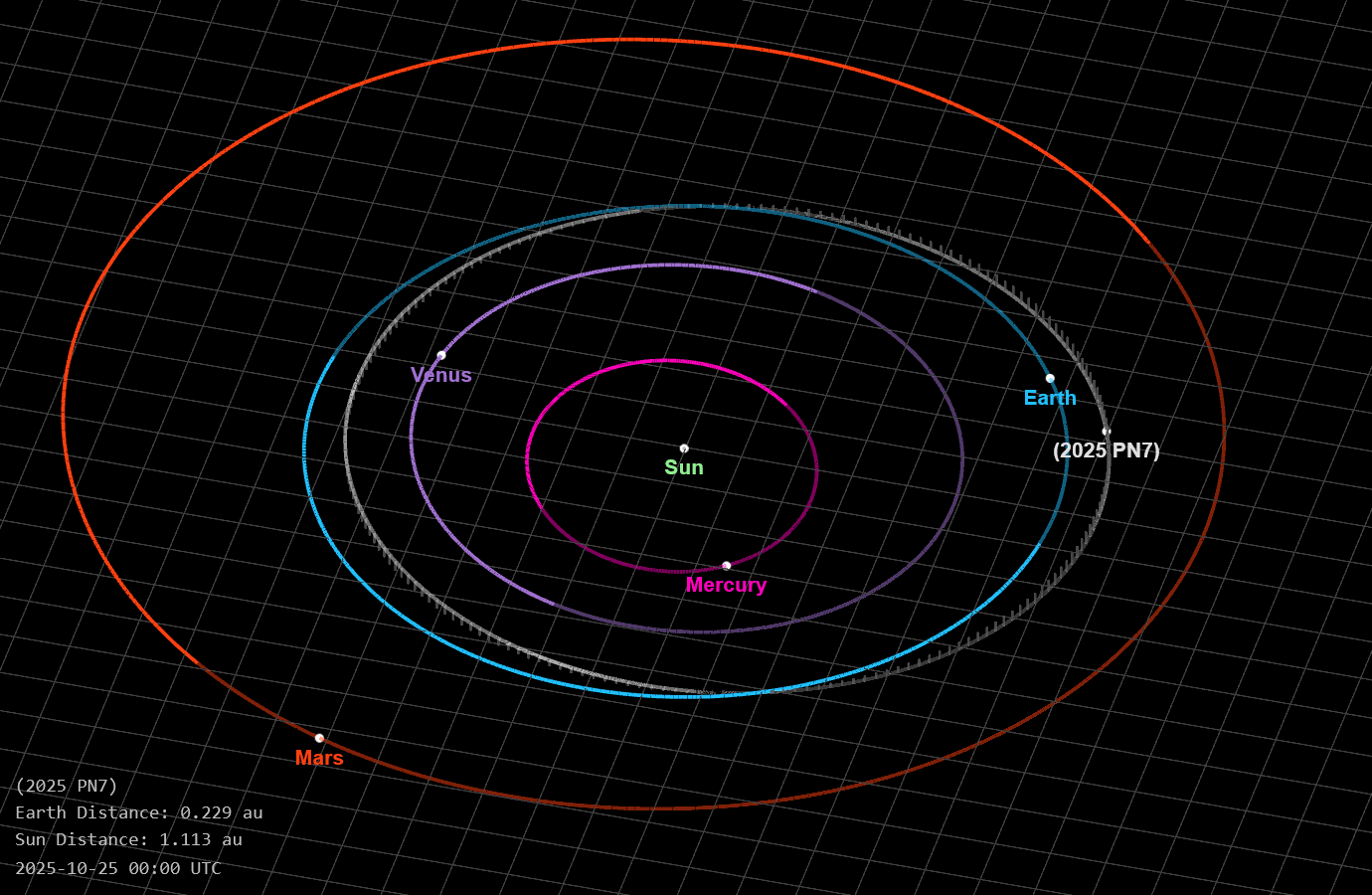
An orbital diagram of 2025 PN_{7}, with the ecliptic grid and the orbits of the inner planets shown

2025 PN_{7} is an Apollo asteroid with a semi-major axis of 1.003 AU, an orbital eccentricity of 0.108, and an orbital inclination of approximately 2°, placing it in the low-eccentricity, low-inclination Arjuna class. Unlike Earth's natural satellite, the Moon, 2025 PN_{7} is not gravitationally bound to Earth. It maintains a 1:1 mean-motion resonance with Earth, making it a quasi-satellite. From Earth's perspective, the asteroid appears to hover nearby.

=== Relationship to Earth ===
2025 PN_{7} joins a small group of known quasi-satellites of Earth, including 164207 Cardea, 469219 Kamoʻoalewa, (277810) 2006 FV35, 2013 LX28, 2014 OL339, and 2023 FW13. Quasi-satellites like 2025 PN_{7} are temporarily co-orbital with Earth but are not true moons. Some Arjuna-class asteroids with particularly Earth-like orbits can occasionally become temporary mini-moons, gravitationally captured by Earth for months to years.

During its closest approach, 2025 PN_{7} comes within approximately 299,000 km of Earth, while at its farthest it can be tens of millions of kilometers away. Over time, it may transition between quasi-satellite and horseshoe orbits due to gravitational perturbations.

== See also ==
- Temporary satellite – objects that become temporarily gravitationally bound to a planet before later escaping
