= Quasi-satellite =

Type of satellite in sync with another orbit

Diagram of generic quasi-satellite orbit

A quasi-satellite is an object in a specific type of co-orbital configuration (1:1 orbital resonance) with a planet (or dwarf planet) where the object stays close to that planet over many orbital periods.

A quasi-satellite's orbit around the Sun takes the same time as the planet's, but has a different eccentricity (usually greater), as shown in the diagram. When viewed from the perspective of the planet by an observer facing the Sun, the quasi-satellite will appear to travel in an oblong retrograde loop around the planet..

In contrast to true satellites, quasi-satellite orbits lie outside the planet's Hill sphere, and are unstable. Over time they tend to evolve to other types of resonant motion, where they no longer remain in the planet's neighborhood, then possibly later move back to a quasi-satellite orbit.

Other types of orbit in a 1:1 resonance with the planet include horseshoe orbits and tadpole orbits around the Lagrangian points, but objects in these orbits do not stay near the planet's longitude over many revolutions about the star. Objects in horseshoe orbits are known to sometimes periodically transfer to a relatively short-lived quasi-satellite orbit, and are sometimes confused with them. An example of such an object is 2002 AA29.

A quasi-satellite is similar to an object in a distant retrograde orbit, in a different context. The latter term is usually used for a space probe or artificial satellite in a retrograde orbit around a moon, and the period may be much shorter than that of the moon, whereas the term "quasi-satellite" usually refers to an object like an asteroid whose period is similar to that of the planet of which it is considered to be a quasi-satellite. But in both cases, the object (asteroid, space probe) viewed in a reference frame that rotates with the two main objects (once a year for Sun–Earth, once a month for Earth–Moon) appears to move retrograde compared to that rotation, thus lengthening its sidereal period. So a quasi-satellite (with low inclination) tends to stay in certain constellations rather than going through the whole zodiac. Quasi-satellites with high eccentricity can get quite far from their planet, more than an astronomical unit for quasi-satellites of Earth such as 2014 OL339.

The word "geosynchronous" is sometimes used to describe quasi-satellites of the Earth, because their motion around the Sun is synchronized with Earth's. However, this usage is unconventional and confusing. Conventionally, geosynchronous satellites revolve in the prograde sense around the Earth, with orbital periods that are synchronized to the Earth's rotation.

== Examples ==
=== Venus ===
Venus has one known quasi-satellite, 524522 Zoozve. This asteroid is also a Mercury- and Earth-crosser; it seems to have been a "companion" to Venus for approximately the last 7,000 years only, and is destined to be ejected from this orbital arrangement about 500 years from now.

=== Earth ===
The oscillating path of asteroid 469219 Kamoʻoalewa viewed from Earth's perspective as it orbits around the Sun. The traced path of Kamoʻoalewa makes it appear as a constant companion of the Earth.

As of 2025, Earth had eight known quasi-satellites:

- 164207 Cardea
- (277810) 2006 FV35
- 2013 LX28
- 2014 OL339
- 469219 Kamoʻoalewa
- 2022 YG
- 2023 FW13
- 2025 PN7

On the longer term, asteroids can transfer between quasi-satellite orbits and horseshoe orbits, which circulate around Lagrangian points L_{4} and L_{5}. By 2016, orbital calculations showed that all five of Earth's then known quasi-satellites repeatedly transfer between horseshoe and quasi-satellite orbits. 3753 Cruithne, 2002 AA29, 2003 YN107, 2015 SO2 and 2020 PP1 are minor planets in horseshoe orbits that might evolve into a quasi-satellite orbit. The time spent in the quasi-satellite phase differs from asteroid to asteroid. Quasi-satellite 469219 Kamoʻoalewa is predicted to be stable in this orbital state for several hundred years, in contrast to 2003 YN_{107} which was a quasi-satellite from 1996 to 2006 but then departed Earth's vicinity on a horseshoe orbit.

469219 Kamoʻoalewa (2016 HO_{3}) is thought to be one of the most stable quasi-satellites found yet of Earth. It stays between 38 and 100 lunar distances from the Earth.

Known and suspected companions of Earth
Name	Eccentricity	Diameter (m)	Discoverer	Date of discovery	Type	Current type
Moon	0.055	3474800	N/A	Prehistory	Natural satellite	Natural satellite
1913 Great Meteor Procession	unknown	unknown	unknown	1913-02-09	Possible temporary satellite	Destroyed
3753 Cruithne	0.515	5000	Duncan Waldron	1986-10-10	Quasi-satellite	Horseshoe orbit
1991 VG	0.053	5–12	Spacewatch	1991-11-06	Temporary satellite	Apollo asteroid
(85770) 1998 UP1	0.345	210–470	Lincoln Lab's ETS	1998-10-18	Horseshoe orbit	Horseshoe orbit
54509 YORP	0.230	124	Lincoln Lab's ETS	2000-08-03	Horseshoe orbit	Horseshoe orbit
2001 GO2	0.168	35–85	Lincoln Lab's ETS	2001-04-13	Possible horseshoe orbit	Possible horseshoe orbit
2002 AA29	0.013	20–100	LINEAR	2002-01-09	Quasi-satellite	Horseshoe orbit
2003 YN107	0.014	10–30	LINEAR	2003-12-20	Quasi-satellite	Horseshoe orbit
164207 Cardea	0.136	160–360	LINEAR	2004-04-13	Quasi-satellite	Quasi-satellite
(277810) 2006 FV35	0.377	140–320	Spacewatch	2006-03-29	Quasi-satellite	Quasi-satellite
2006 JY26	0.083	6–13	Catalina Sky Survey	2006-05-06	Horseshoe orbit	Horseshoe orbit
2006 RH120	0.024	2–3	Catalina Sky Survey	2006-09-13	Temporary satellite	Apollo asteroid
(419624) 2010 SO16	0.075	357	WISE	2010-09-17	Horseshoe orbit	Horseshoe orbit
(706765) 2010 TK7	0.191	150–500	WISE	2010-10-01	Earth trojan	Earth trojan
2013 BS45	0.083	20–40	Spacewatch	2010-01-20	Horseshoe orbit	Horseshoe orbit
2013 LX28	0.452	130–300	Pan-STARRS	2013-06-12	Quasi-satellite temporary	Quasi-satellite temporary
2014 OL339	0.461	70–160	EURONEAR	2014-07-29	Quasi-satellite temporary	Quasi-satellite temporary
2015 SO2	0.108	50–110	Črni Vrh Observatory	2015-09-21	Quasi-satellite	Horseshoe orbit temporary
2015 XX169	0.184	9–22	Mount Lemmon Survey	2015-12-09	Horseshoe orbit temporary	Horseshoe orbit temporary
2015 YA	0.279	9–22	Catalina Sky Survey	2015-12-16	Horseshoe orbit temporary	Horseshoe orbit temporary
2015 YQ1	0.404	7–16	Mount Lemmon Survey	2015-12-19	Horseshoe orbit temporary	Horseshoe orbit temporary
469219 Kamoʻoalewa	0.104	40–100	Pan-STARRS	2016-04-27	Quasi-satellite stable	Quasi-satellite stable
DN160822_03	?	?	?	2016-08-22	Possible temporary satellite	Destroyed
2020 CD3	0.017	1–6	Mount Lemmon Survey	2020-02-15	Temporary satellite	Apollo asteroid
2020 PN1	0.127	10–50	ATLAS-HKO	2020-08-12	Horseshoe orbit temporary	Horseshoe orbit temporary
2020 PP1	0.074	10–20	Pan-STARRS	2020-08-12	Quasi-satellite stable	Horseshoe orbit stable
(614689) 2020 XL5	0.387	1100–1260	Pan-STARRS	2020-12-12	Earth trojan	Earth trojan
2022 NX1	0.025	5–15	Moonbase South Observatory	2020-07-02	Temporary satellite	Apollo asteroid
2022 YG	0.196	16–30	Gennadiy Borisov	2022-12-15	Quasi-satellite	Quasi-satellite
2023 FW13	0.177	10–20	Pan-STARRS	2023-03-28	Quasi-satellite	Quasi-satellite
2024 PT5	0.021	7–13	ATLAS South Africa, Sutherland	2024-08-07	Temporary satellite	Apollo asteroid
2025 PN7	0.107	19–30	Pan-STARRS	2025-08-02	Quasi-satellite	Quasi-satellite
2026 QQ8	0.0261776	< 10	Krisztián Sárneczky	2026-08-20	Temporary satellite	Temporary satellite

=== Ceres ===
The dwarf planet asteroid 1 Ceres is believed to have a quasi-satellite, the as-yet-unnamed (76146) 2000 EU16.

=== Neptune ===
(309239) 2007 RW10 is a temporary quasi-satellite of Neptune. The object has been a quasi-satellite of Neptune for about 12,500 years and it will remain in that dynamical state for another 12,500 years.

=== Other planets ===
Based on simulations, it is believed that Uranus and Neptune could potentially hold quasi-satellites for up to the age of the Solar System (about 4.5 billion years), but a quasi-satellite's orbit would remain stable for only 10 million years near Jupiter and 100,000 years near Saturn. Jupiter and Saturn are known to have quasi-satellites. 2015 OL106, a co-orbital to Jupiter, intermittently becomes a quasi-satellite of the planet, and will next become one between 2380 and 2480.

=== Artificial quasi-satellites ===
In early 1989, the Soviet Phobos 2 spacecraft was injected into a quasi-satellite orbit around the Martian moon Phobos, with a mean orbital radius of about 100 kilometres (62 mi) from Phobos. According to computations, it could have then stayed trapped in the vicinity of Phobos for many months. The spacecraft was lost due to a malfunction of the on-board control system.

The Japanese Martian Moons eXplorer mission is aiming for a similar orbit because Phobos is too small to support real orbits.

In 2005, aerospace engineer Thomas Gangale proposed a quasi-satellite orbit for spacecraft to provide communications relays between Earth and crews on Mars when Mars is in solar conjunction and direct communication is blocked by the Sun for several weeks.

=== Accidental quasi-satellites ===
Some objects are known to be accidental quasi-satellites, which means that they are not forced into the configuration by the gravitational influence of the body of which they are quasi-satellites. The dwarf planets Ceres and Pluto are known to have accidental quasi-satellites. In the case of Pluto, the known accidental quasi-satellite, 15810 Arawn, is, like Pluto, a plutino, and is forced into this configuration by the gravitational influence of Neptune. This dynamical behavior is recurrent where Arawn becomes a quasi-satellite of Pluto every 2.4 Myr and remains in that configuration for nearly 350,000 years.

== See also ==
- Satellite – Objects intentionally placed into orbit
- Natural satellite – Astronomical body that orbits a planet
- Satellite system (astronomy) – Set of gravitationally bound objects in orbit
- Temporary satellite – Object captured by a planet for a while
