= Cardea (disambiguation) =

Cardea may refer to:

- Cardea, an ancient Roman goddess of the door-hinge.
- Cardea (DRM), a codename for Microsoft Windows Media DRM
- 164207 Cardea, an asteroid and quasi-satellite of Earth
- Cardea, the precursor group to San Francisco lesbian-feminist BDSM organization Samois
- Cardea, an atoll of the former micronation the Republic of Minerva
- Cardea, the marketing name given to a large housing development at Stanground, a suburb of Peterborough
- Caryatis Cardea, former editor of the journal Sinister Wisdom
- Frank Cardea, writer on the television series NCIS
