= Kepler-91b =

Giant planet

Discovery
- Discovery date: 2013
- Detection method: Transit (Kepler Mission)

Orbital characteristics
- Semi-major axis: 0.072+0.007 −0.002 AU
- Orbital period (sidereal): 6.24658 d
- Inclination: 68.5+1.6 −1
- Star: Kepler-91

Physical characteristics
- Mean radius: 1.367+0.069 −0.060 R_{J}
- Mass: 0.81+0.18 −0.17 M_{J}
- Mean density: 0.44 g/cm^{3} (0.016 lb/cu in)
- Albedo: 0.39
- Temperature: 2132 K

Kepler-91b is a giant planet orbiting Kepler-91, a star slightly more massive than the Sun. Kepler-91 has left the main sequence and is now a red giant branch star.

== Discovery and further confirmation ==
Kepler-91b was detected by analyzing the data of Kepler space telescope where a transit-like signal was found. Initially thought to be a false positive due to light curve variations by a self-luminous object, it was later revealed that due to Kepler-91's low density, its shape is distorted to a slightly ellipsoidal shape due to gravitational effects of the planet. Ellipsoidal light variations caused by Kepler-91b constitute more than the third of the light variations compared to transit depth. Ellipsoidal light variations also allowed to determine the planet's mass. It was also found that Kepler-91b reflects some of the starlight from its star.

Further analysis managed to question the planetary nature of the object, suspecting that it is a self-luminous object. However, the planetary nature was eventually confirmed again through both the radial velocity technique and re-analysis of the light curve modulations.

== Characteristics ==
Kepler-91b is about 14% less massive than Jupiter while being more than 35% larger, making it less than half of the density of water. Kepler-91b orbits around the host star in about 6.25 days. Despite being one of the least edge-on orbits relative to Earth with inclination being about 68.5 degrees, transit was detected due to low semi-major axis to host star radius ratio.

Kepler-91b is expected to be engulfed by the parent star within about 55 million years.

== Possible trojan companion ==
The possibility of a trojan planet to Kepler-91b was suggested due to the presence of a small dim in the phase-folded light curve at phase 0.68. This was subsequently studied but the conclusion was that the transit-signal was a false-positive.
