= Frédéric Petit (astronomer) =

French astronomer (1810–1865)

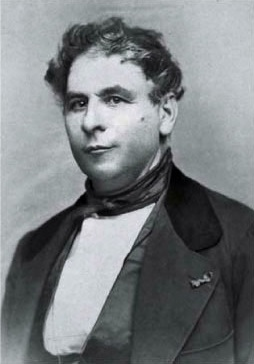
Frédéric Petit

Frédéric Petit (Muret, 1810 – Toulouse, 1865) was a French astronomer. He was the first director of the Toulouse Observatory, located in Toulouse, France, serving from 1838 to 1865. In 1846 he announced that he had discovered a second moon of Earth. His discovery was later dismissed by his peers, although the concept of a second smaller satellite of the Earth was used by Jules Verne in his novel From the Earth to the Moon.
