= Box orbit =

Type of gravitational orbit seen in triaxial systems

In stellar dynamics, a box orbit refers to a particular type of orbit that can be seen in triaxial systems, i.e. systems that do not possess a symmetry around any of its axes. They contrast with the loop orbits that are observed in spherically symmetric or axisymmetric systems.

In a box orbit, a star oscillates independently along the three different axes as it moves through the system. As a result of this motion, it fills in a (roughly) box-shaped region of space. Unlike loop orbits, the stars on box orbits can come arbitrarily close to the center of the system. As a special case, if the frequencies of oscillation in different directions are commensurate, the orbit will lie on a one- or two-dimensional manifold and can avoid the center. Such orbits are sometimes called "boxlets".

Examples of box orbits (in 2 dimensions)
| Beginning of a box orbit | Many cycles of a box orbit | A closed box orbit |

== See also ==
- Horseshoe orbit
- Lissajous curve
- List of orbits
