= (76146) 2000 EU16 =

Small asteroid in the main-belt and quasi-satellite of Ceres

(76146) 2000 EU_{16}
Discovery
- Discovered by: LINEAR
- Discovery site: Lincoln Lab ETS
- Discovery date: 3 March 2000

Designations
- Alternative designations: 2002 TO_{288}
- Minor planet category: main-belt · (middle)

Orbital characteristics
- Epoch 21 January 2022 (JD 2459600.5)
- Uncertainty parameter 0
- Observation arc: 22.85 yr (8,345 days)
- Aphelion: 2.5806 AU
- Perihelion: 2.306 AU
- Semi-major axis: 2.766 AU
- Eccentricity: 0.1665
- Orbital period (sidereal): 4.60 yr (1,680 days)
- Mean anomaly: 130.990°
- Mean motion: 0° 12^{m} 51.133^{s} / day
- Inclination: 8.850°
- Longitude of ascending node: 334.258°
- Argument of perihelion: 347.850°

Physical characteristics
- Mean diameter: 3.493±1.139 km
- Geometric albedo: 0.252±0.112
- Absolute magnitude (H): 14.38

(76146) 2000 EU_{16} is a small asteroid in the main-belt and discovered by LINEAR on 3 March 2000 in Lincoln Lab ETS, and the only known quasi-satellite of the dwarf planet asteroid 1 Ceres. From the perspective of Ceres, its orbit traces an analemma.
