= (436724) 2011 UW158 =

Stony, walnut-shaped asteroid and fast rotator

(436724) 2011 UW_{158}
- Animation of Arecibo radar images of 2011 UW_{158}

Discovery
- Discovered by: Pan-STARRS 1
- Discovery site: Haleakala Obs.
- Discovery date: 25 October 2011

Designations
- Minor planet category: Apollo · NEO · PHA

Orbital characteristics
- Epoch 4 September 2017 (JD 2458000.5)
- Uncertainty parameter 0
- Observation arc: 5.48 yr (2,003 days)
- Aphelion: 2.2301 AU
- Perihelion: 1.0109 AU
- Semi-major axis: 1.6205 AU
- Eccentricity: 0.3762
- Orbital period (sidereal): 2.06 yr (753 days)
- Mean anomaly: 12.072°
- Mean motion: 0° 28^{m} 40.08^{s} / day
- Inclination: 4.5717°
- Longitude of ascending node: 286.00°
- Argument of perihelion: 8.7537°
- Earth MOID: 0.0020 AU · 0.8 LD

Physical characteristics
- Dimensions: 0.22±0.04 km 0.3 × 0.6 km 0.311 km (calculated)
- Synodic rotation period: 0.61069±0.00002 h (Note: Lightcurve plot of 2011 UW_{158} by Brian Warner at the CS3–Palmer Divide Station in July 2015: rotation period of 0.61069±0.00002 hours with an amplitude of 0.65 magnitude); 0.61070±0.00003 h 0.61073 h 0.610752±0.000001 h
- Geometric albedo: 0.20 (assumed); 0.39±0.09
- Spectral type: S
- Absolute magnitude (H): 19.45±0.27 · 19.9 · 19.93±0.11

(436724) 2011 UW_{158} is a stony, walnut-shaped asteroid and fast rotator, classified as a near-Earth object and potentially hazardous asteroid of the Apollo group, approximately 300 meters in diameter. It was discovered on 25 October 2011, by Pan-STARRS at Haleakala Observatory on the island of Maui, Hawaii, in the United States.

== Orbital description ==
2011 UW_{158} orbits the Sun at a distance of 1.0–2.2 AU once every 2 years and 1 month (753 days). Its orbit has an eccentricity of 0.38 and an inclination of 5° with respect to the ecliptic. Its observation arc begins with its official discovery observation by Pan-STARRS, as no precoveries were taken, and no prior identifications were made.

=== Close approach ===
The asteroid has an Earth minimum orbit intersection distance of 0.0020 AU (300,000 km), which corresponds to 0.8 lunar distances (LD). On 19 July 2015, it passed about 2.5 million kilometers from Earth (6.5 LD), attracting the interest of astronomers. The asteroid was listed as level 1 in the Torino Scale on 4 November 2011, 9 days after its discovery, but was removed two weeks later.

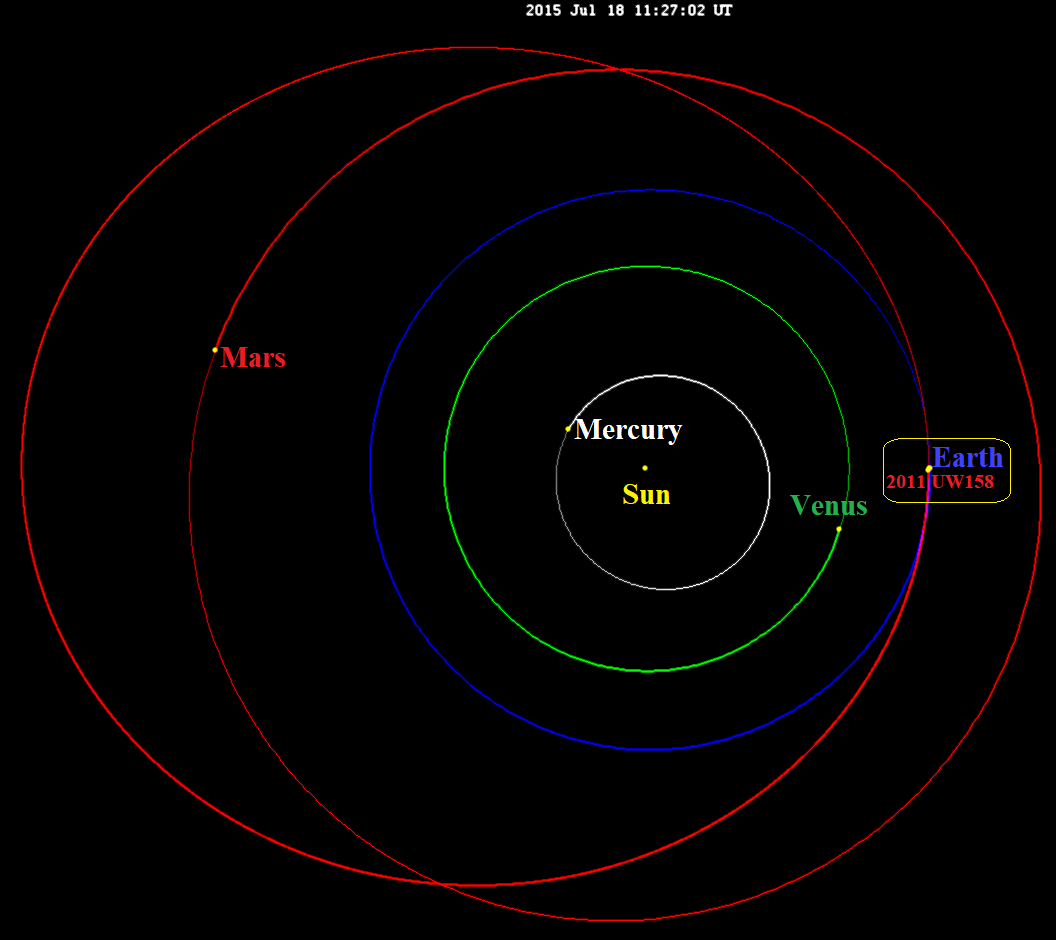
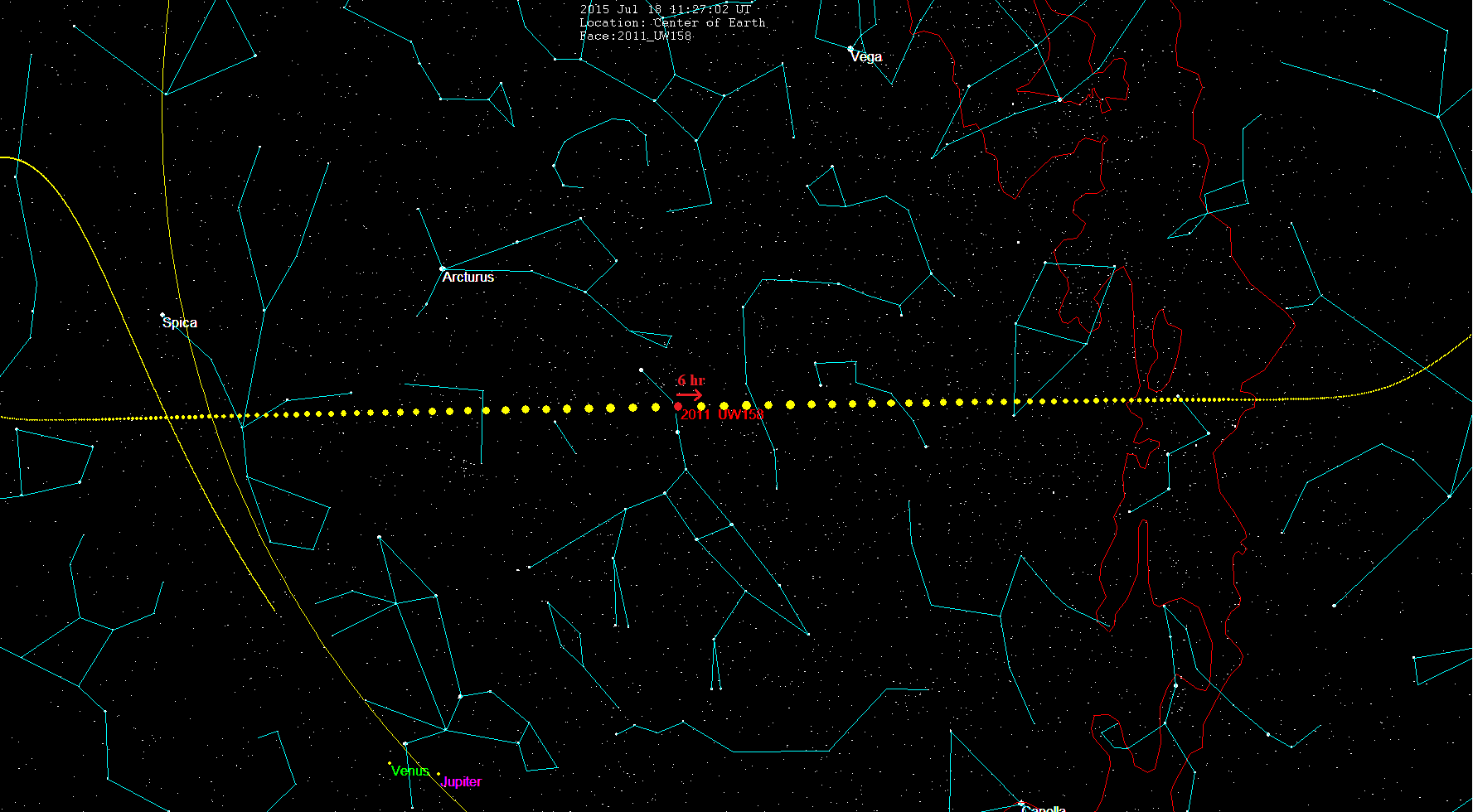
Left: Inner solar system orbits; right: Motion of 2011 UW_{158} across sky, 6 hour motion

== Physical characteristics ==
=== Spectral type ===
2011 UW_{158} is an assumed stony S-type asteroid, the most common type among the populations of near-Earth and inner main-belt asteroids.

=== Diameter and albedo ===
Bruce Gary at Hereford Arizona Observatory (G95) estimated a mean diameter of 220 meters with a high albedo of 0.39, while the Collaborative Asteroid Lightcurve Link assumes a standard albedo for stony asteroid of 0.20 and calculates a mean-diameter of 311 meters based on an absolute magnitude of 19.9.

=== Fast rotator ===
In July and August 2015, rotational lightcurves of this asteroid were obtained from photometric observations by Bruce Gary at Hereford Arizona Observatory and by Brian Warner at the CS3–Palmer Divide Station in California (U82). Lightcurve analysis gave a rotation period of 0.6107 hours (36.6 minutes) with a brightness variation between 0.52 and 2.05 magnitude (U=3/3/3). This makes 2011 UW_{158} one of the top 200 fast rotators, suggesting it is a large boulder rather than a rubble pile.

=== Shape ===
Radar observations by the Arecibo Observatory on 14 July 2015, revealed that the asteroid's shape looks like an unshelled walnut with a diameter of 300 by 600 metres. The radiometric observations also agreed with the previously obtained photometric ones and gave a period of 37 minutes.

== Media attention ==
It also attracted the media and even firms such as Planetary Resources for its alleged content of platinum worth as high as 5 trillion U.S. dollars. Commenters at StackExchange have denied these estimations as being "orders of magnitude too high", and radar observations have shown that the object contains no more metal than an average rocky asteroid.
