= 469219 Kamoʻoalewa =

Near-Earth asteroid

- Kamoʻoalewa imaged by Tianwen-2 on 2 July 2026 from a distance of 20 km

Discovery
- Discovered by: Pan-STARRS
- Discovery site: Haleakala Observatory
- Discovery date: 27 April 2016

Designations
- Pronunciation: /kəˌmoʊʔoʊəˈlɛvə/ Hawaiian: [kəˈmoʔowəˈlɛvə]
- Named after: Ka moʻo a lewa ("the oscillating fragment")
- Alternative designations: 2016 HO_{3}
- Minor planet category: NEO; Apollo; Earth quasi-satellite

Orbital characteristics
- Epoch 2024-Mar-31 (JD 2460400.5)
- Uncertainty parameter 0
- Observation arc: 20.00 yr (7,306 d)
- Aphelion: 1.10373 AU
- Perihelion: 0.89816 AU
- Semi-major axis: 1.00094 AU
- Eccentricity: 0.10269 (964 wrt Earth) (Note: Computed with JPL Horizons using a geocentric solution. Ephemeris Type: Orbital Elements / Center: 500 / Time Span: 2022-Jan-21 (to match infobox epoch))
- Orbital period (sidereal): 1.0014 yr (365.77 d)
- Mean anomaly: 175.153°
- Mean motion: 0° 59^{m} 3.192^{s} / day
- Inclination: 7.79605°
- Longitude of ascending node: 65.7907°
- Argument of perihelion: 305.0478°
- Earth MOID: 0.0311 AU (12.1 LD)

Physical characteristics
- Mean diameter: 27.4 m
- Synodic rotation period: 0.465±0.008 h (Note: Exceptional rotation period of 0.467 ± 0.008 hours (28.02 ± 0.48 minutes) with a brightness amplitude of 0.80±0.05 mag, quality code = 2, based on summary figures at the LCDB, which references (Reddy 2018). Relevant abstract in ADS is (Reddy 2017).); 27.9 minutes
- Geometric albedo: 0.59+0.25 −0.17
- Temperature: 253.15–473.15 k
- Spectral type: E
- Absolute magnitude (H): 24.33; 24.3

469219 Kamoʻoalewa (/kəˌmoʊʔoʊəˈlɛvə/; provisional designation 2016 HO_{3}) is a very small Apollo-type near-Earth asteroid approximately 27.4 meters (90 feet) in diameter. It is an elongated object that rapidly rotates every 28 minutes. At present it is a quasi-satellite of Earth, and currently the second-smallest, second-closest, and second most stable known such quasi-satellite (after 2023 FW13).

Kamoʻoalewa was discovered by Pan-STARRS at Haleakala Observatory on 27 April 2016. It is the target of the China National Space Administration's Tianwen-2 mission, which arrived at the asteroid on July 4, 2026 and is intended to orbit the object for nine months before retrieving samples from the surface and returning them to Earth in 2027.

The object's Earth-like orbit, proximity to the Earth–Moon system, higher spectral reddening relative to other asteroids, and similarity to space weathered lunar materials indicate that it is likely lunar ejecta. However, it might also be an S-type or L-type asteroid. Despite being most similar to weathered Apollo 14 and Luna 24 Lunar Mare soils, it is suggested to be from the lunar far-side highland crust crater, Giordano Bruno.

Orbital similarities suggest it is likely a co-orbital pair with 2000 WN10 or a broken up set including the other NEOs 2020 KZ2, 2020 PN1, and 2020 PP1.

== Discovery and naming ==
Kamoʻoalewa imaged by the Canada–France–Hawaii Telescope on 28 April 2016

Kamoʻoalewa was first spotted on 27 April 2016, by the Pan-STARRS 1 asteroid survey telescope on Haleakalā, Hawaii, that is operated by the University of Hawaii's Institute for Astronomy and funded by NASA's Planetary Defense Coordination Office. It was named Ka moʻo a lewa in 2019, from the Hawaiian chant Kumulipo for an oscillating celestial object by A Hua He Inoa at the 'Imiloa Astronomy Center of Hawai'i.

The name Kamoʻoalewa is derived from the Hawaiian words ka 'the'; moʻo 'fragment', referring to it being a piece broken off a larger object; a 'of'; and lewa 'to oscillate', referring to its motion in the sky as viewed from Earth. The official naming citation was published by the Minor Planet Center on 6 April 2019 (M.P.C. 112435).

== Orbit and classification ==
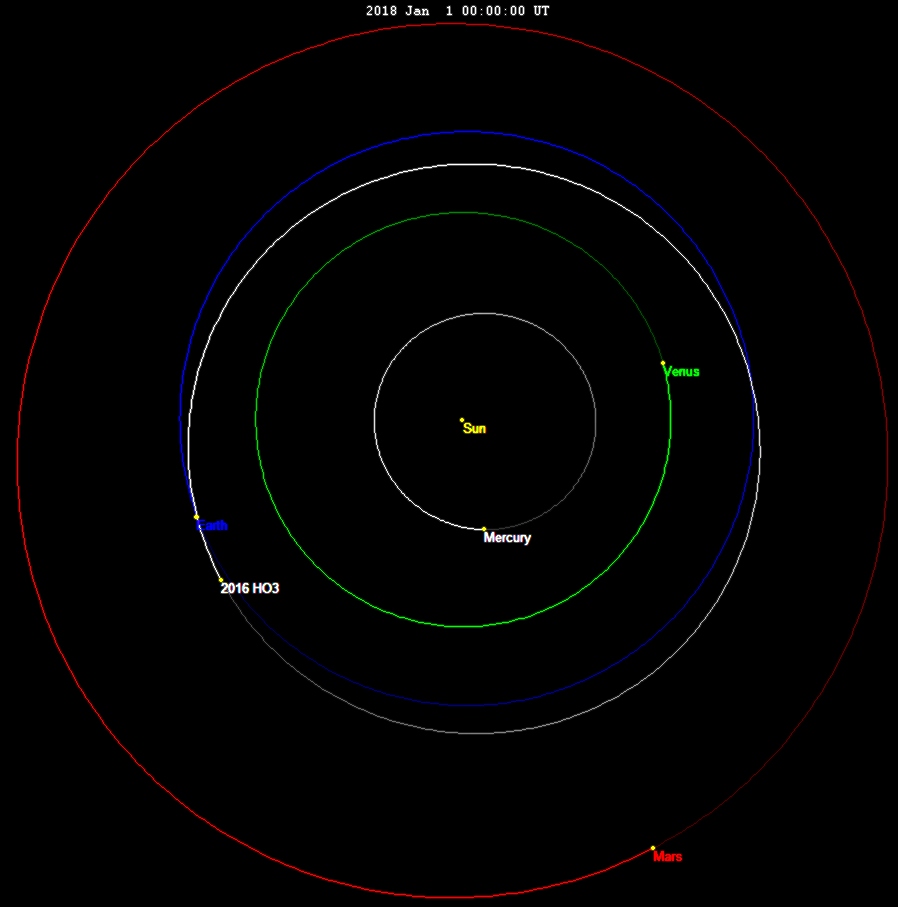
Orbit of Kamoʻoalewa in the inner Solar System

Kamoʻoalewa orbits the Sun at a distance of 0.90–1.10 AU. Although the period as of 2022 is about 366 days, its longer-term average period is closer to 365 days. Kamoʻoalewa is a quasi-moon and not gravitationally bound to Earth like a true satellite. Its orbit transfers between a quasi satellite orbit type which resides in the L_{1} and L_{2} Lagrange points, and a horseshoe orbit between the L_{4} and L_{5} Lagrange points.

Its orbit has an eccentricity of 0.10 and an inclination of 8° with respect to the ecliptic. In March 2024, it had an Earth minimum orbital intersection distance of 0.031 AU (4.6 million km) or 12 lunar distances, well outside of Earth's Hill sphere of 1.5 million km (3.9 LD).

=== Quasi-satellite of Earth ===
The oscillating path of asteroid Kamoʻoalewa as it orbits around the Sun. The traced path of Kamoʻoalewa makes it appear as a constant companion of the Earth.

In a rotating frame of reference Kamoʻoalewa appears to circle elliptically around the Earth every ~45 years. Although it is too distant to be considered a true natural satellite of Earth, it is the best and most stable example to date of a near-Earth companion, or quasi-satellite. Orbital and Yarkovsky effect modeling suggest it will be stable for 0.3–0.5 million years.

Paul Chodas, manager of NASA's Center for Near-Earth Object Studies (CNEOS) at the Jet Propulsion Laboratory (JPL) in Pasadena, California described the orbit of Kamoʻoalewa as a quasi-satellite of Earth. Unlike asteroid 2003 YN107, which previously followed a similar orbit, Kamoʻoalewa is more stable and has been Earth's companion for more than a century and will remain so for much longer. This asteroid spends half of its orbit closer to the Sun than Earth and the other half farther away, causing it to oscillate above and below Earth's orbit annually. Its orbit experiences slight drifts that Earth's gravity corrects, keeping it between 38 and 100 times the distance of the Moon. Thus, Kamoʻoalewa continually dances around the Earth.

The closest Earth approach was on 27 December 1923 (102 years ago) at 12.44 million km (0.0832 AU; 32.4 LD). By late May 2369, the asteroid will be 2.0 AU (780 LD; 300 million km) from Earth. The Earth-like orbit may be a result of it being lunar ejecta. Most objects in this kind of orbit are eventually perturbed out of being in an Earth-co-orbital state and hit the Earth, Venus, or the Sun or are ejected from the Solar System, and Kamoʻoalewa will probably hit the Earth in the next 100 million years.

== Physical characteristics ==
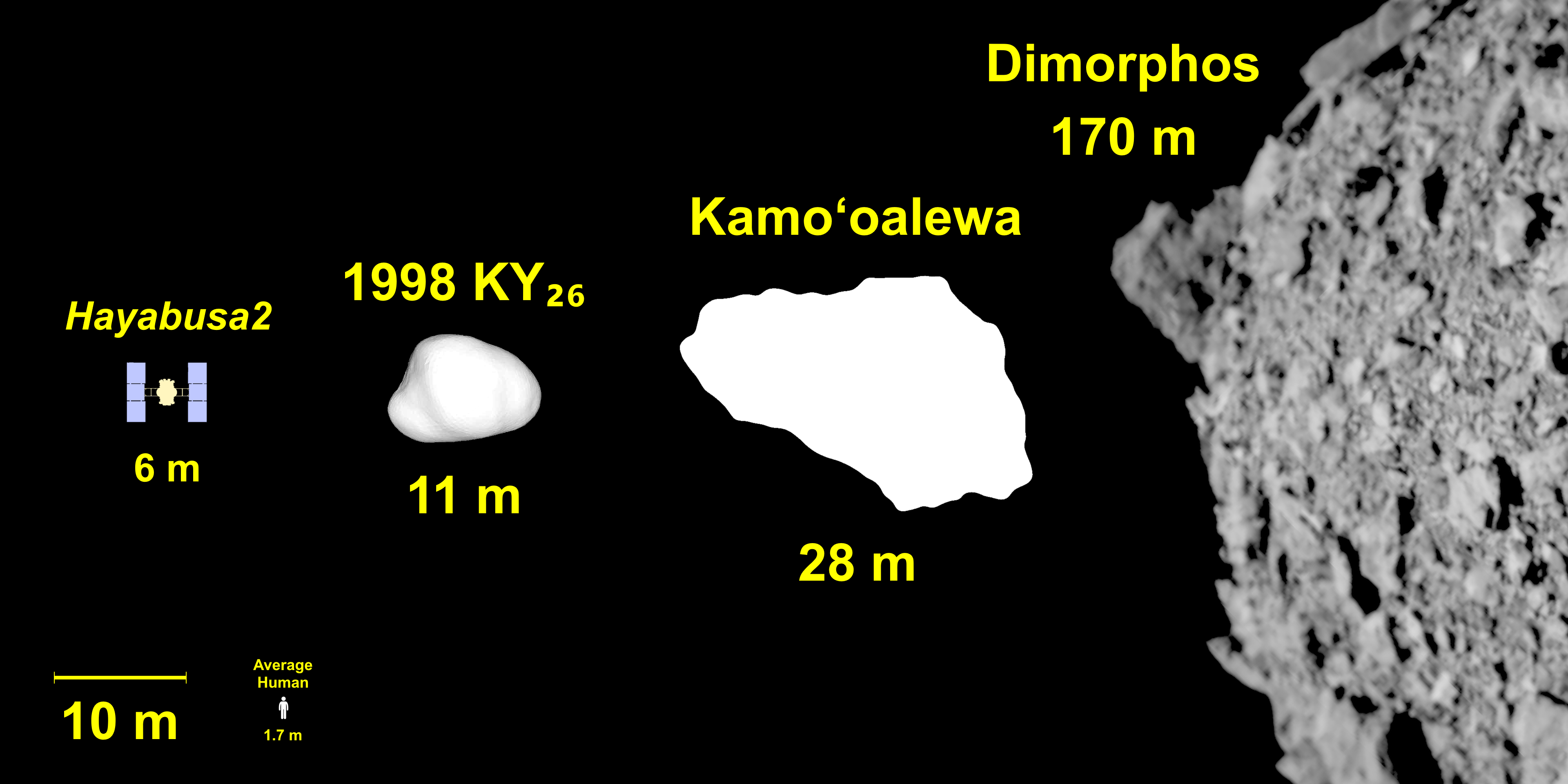
Size comparison of small asteroids 1998 KY26, Kamoʻoalewa, and Dimorphos. On the left, the average human and the Hayabusa2 spacecraft are shown for scale.

The size of Kamoʻoalewa has not yet been firmly established, but it is approximately 27.4 meters (90 feet) in diameter.

Photometric observations in April 2017 revealed that Kamoʻoalewa is a fast rotator. Lightcurve analysis gave a rotation period of 27.66 minutes and a brightness variation of 0.80±0.05 magnitude (U=2). 2024 inversion modeling was used to create a 100m x 81m x 46m (~72m diameter) 3D model from light curve data. A new light curve model from 2026 has refined its dimensions to 68 × 46 × 39 m. However, thermal emission measurements with the James Webb Space Telescope (JWST) in 2026 indicate a much smaller mean diameter of 18 ± 2 m and a best‑fit visible albedo of pV = 0.59 +0.25/-0.17 (models with pV as low as 0.36 also fit adequately). JWST brightness variations independently confirm a rapid rotation period of about 27.9 minutes and an axis ratio of ~1.4, giving dimensions of roughly 15–21 m.

In 2021, a spectroscopic characterization of Kamoʻoalewa was conducted using the Large Binocular Telescope and the Lowell Discovery Telescope, which found that the asteroid is likely silicate in origin. The object's Earth-like orbit, proximity to the Earth–Moon system, higher spectral reddening to other asteroids, and similarity to space weathered lunar materials indicate that it is likely lunar ejecta. In 2026, JWST’s NIRSpec instrument and new LBT observations revealed a spectrum that is notably less red (more neutral) in the 1.0–2.5 μm range. The infrared colors are more similar to S‑, V‑, or E‑type asteroids than to weathered lunar silicates. A faint silicate absorption band is detected at 0.93 ± 0.01 μm, while no 2.0 μm absorption is seen. Together with the high albedo, these features point to an oldhamite‑bearing, enstatite‑rich composition rather than lunar mare soils. The temperature of the asteroid is estimated to be between 253.15 kelvin and 473.15 kelvin.

Lunar ejecta modeling shows some avenues that can achieve a stable Kamo'oalewa-style quasi-satellite orbit.

== Exploration ==
=== Tianwen-2 ===
The China National Space Administration (CNSA) launched the Tianwen-2 mission in May 2025 to return samples from Kamoʻoalewa. The spacecraft arrived at Kamoʻoalewa on July 4, 2026, and will spend several months surveying and imaging the asteroid, before collecting samples and departing in April 2027. The spacecraft has already performed relative position measurements of the asteroid, and when combined with ground-based spacecraft orbital tracking data, it has obtained ephemeris data for Kamoʻoalewa during this period.

=== Proposed missions ===
Numerous mission concepts targeting Kamoʻoalewa have been proposed, including a 2019 NASA solar-sail mission concept, a University of Colorado flyby and impact experiment, and was selected as a target for the Chinese ZhengHe project, which has developed into the Tianwen-2 mission. The chondritic simulants QLS-1, 2, and 3 have been developed by the Qian Xuesen Laboratory of Space Technology to better prepare for these missions. In an ambitious proposal, Kamoʻoalewa is even considered for use as a space station for Earth-to-Mars travel.

During the 2017 Astrodynamics Specialist Conference held in Stevenson in the U.S. state of Washington, a team composed of graduate research assistants from the University of Colorado Boulder and the São Paulo State University (UNESP) was awarded for presenting a project denominated "Near-Earth Asteroid Characterization and Observation (NEACO) Mission to Asteroid (469219) 2016 HO_{3}", providing the first baselines for the investigation of this celestial object using a spacecraft. Recently, another version of this work was presented adopting different constraints in the dynamics.

== Gallery ==
Animation of the orbit of Kamoʻoalewa from 2000 to 2300, showing quasi-satellite phase

Relative to Sun and Earth (rotating frame of reference)

Around Earth (non-rotating frame)

Around Sun (non-rotating frame)

Sun · Earth · 469219 Kamoʻoalewa
Animation of the orbit of Kamoʻoalewa from 1600 to 2500, going from horseshoe orbit to quasi-satellite and back

Relative to Sun and Earth (rotating frame of reference)

Around Earth (non-rotating frame)

Around Sun (non-rotating frame)

Sun · Earth · 469219 Kamoʻoalewa

== See also ==
- Arjuna asteroid
- 3753 Cruithne
- 6Q0B44E
- 2001 GO2
- 2002 AA29
- 2003 YN107
- 164207 Cardea
- 2006 JY26
- 2006 RH120
- 2012 FC71
- 2013 BS45
- (419624) 2010 SO16
- (436724) 2011 UW158
- 524522 Zoozve, a quasi-satellite of Venus, and the first quasi-satellite discovered around any major planet
