= 2014 OL339 =

Quasi-satellite of Earth

2014 OL_{339}
Discovery
- Discovered by: EURONEAR (unofficial credits)
- Discovery site: La Palma Obs. (first observed)
- Discovery date: 29 July 2014

Designations
- Minor planet category: NEO; Aten; Venus crosser; Earth crosser

Orbital characteristics
- Epoch 16 February 2017 (JD 2457800.5)
- Uncertainty parameter 1
- Observation arc: 2.10 yr (768 days)
- Aphelion: 1.4598 AU
- Perihelion: 0.5388 AU
- Semi-major axis: 0.9993 AU
- Eccentricity: 0.4608
- Orbital period (sidereal): 1.00 yr (365 days)
- Mean anomaly: 285.00°
- Mean motion: 0° 59^{m} 12.12^{s} / day
- Inclination: 10.187°
- Longitude of ascending node: 252.18°
- Argument of perihelion: 289.69°
- Earth MOID: 0.0179 AU

Physical characteristics
- Dimensions: 170 m (est. at 0.25)
- Absolute magnitude (H): 22.9

2014 OL_{339} is an Aten asteroid that is a temporary quasi-satellite of Earth, the fourth known Earth quasi-satellite.

== Discovery ==
2014 OL_{339} was discovered on 29 July 2014 by Farid Char of the Chilean University of Antofagasta. The actual observers were O. Vaduvescu and V. Tudor, observing from the Roque de los Muchachos Observatory for the EURONEAR project with the Isaac Newton Telescope. The intended target of the program was the Apollo asteroid 2013 VQ_{4} but F. Char identified 2014 OL_{339} as a streak near the edge of the observed field. As of 14 August 2015, it has been observed 39 times with an observation arc of 381 days.

== Orbit and orbital evolution ==
2014 OL_{339} is currently an Aten asteroid (Earth-crossing but with a period less than a year). Its semi-major axis (currently 0.9994 AU) is similar to that of Earth (0.9992 AU), but it has a relatively high eccentricity (0.4607) and moderate orbital inclination (10.1910°). Gravitational interaction with Earth causes its orbit to change so that its average period is one year (This means it alternates between being an Aten asteroid and being an Apollo asteroid.) Its mean longitude (around the Sun) is similar to that of Earth, which means that it is fairly close to Earth (less than about 1.5 AU). This makes it a quasi-satellite. It moves in a kidney-shaped path going from east to west relative to Earth ("retrograde", the opposite way from the Moon). The relative mean longitude compared to Earth (that is, its mean longitude minus that of Earth) librates around zero. This means that the center of the "kidney" moves back and forth over a period of years, from being in front of Earth to being behind Earth, but this movement is centered on Earth.

It became a quasi-satellite at least 775 years ago and will stop being that 165 years from now after a "close" encounter with Earth (0.13 AU). This quasi-satellite episode will have had a duration of around a thousand years or more, but less than 2,500 years. Before and after this episode it passes in and out of other types of co-orbital orbits, such as being a trojan or a "passing object" (one whose relative longitude to Earth can attain any value, which is not the case for a quasi-satellite or a trojan).

== Physical properties ==
With an absolute magnitude of 22.9, it has an estimated diameter of approximately 170 meters for an albedo of 0.25, which is typical for stony asteroids.

== See also ==
- 164207 Cardea
- (277810) 2006 FV35
- 2013 LX28
