= 2026 QQ8 =

Temporary satellite of Earth

Discovery
- Discovered by: Krisztián Sárneczky
- Discovery site: Piszkéstető Station
- Discovery date: 19 August 2026

Designations
- Designation: 2026 QQ_{8}
- Minor planet category: NEO; Aten

Orbital characteristics
- Epoch 9 June 2026 (JD 2461200.5)
- Uncertainty parameter 1
- Observation arc: 80 days
- Aphelion: 1.0146 AU
- Perihelion: 0.9628 AU
- Semi-major axis: 0.9887 AU
- Eccentricity: 0.02618
- Orbital period (sidereal): 359.07 d (0.9831 yr)
- Mean anomaly: 158.83°
- Inclination: 0.5283°
- Longitude of ascending node: 45.090°
- Argument of perihelion: 52.287°
- Earth MOID: 0.003762 AU
- T_{Jupiter}: 6.134

Physical characteristics
- Mean diameter: ~1–2 m
- Absolute magnitude (H): 31.37±0.34

2026 QQ_{8} is a small near-Earth asteroid that, as of November 2026, is temporarily captured in an orbit around Earth. It was discovered on 19 August 2026 by Krisztián Sárneczky at Piszkéstető Station, Hungary. On 29 October 2026 the Minor Planet Center (MPC) reported in a Minor Planet Electronic Circular that orbit integrations indicate the object is temporarily bound to Earth, and that no link to a known artificial object had been found. It is thought to have been captured in April 2026.

The object is about 1–2 metres across. Even if it were to collide with Earth, it would likely burn up completely in the atmosphere before reaching the surface. It is expected to remain bound until about the end of 2026 before resuming its orbit around the Sun in 2027.

2026 QQ_{8} is classified as an Aten asteroid. Its minimum orbit intersection distance with Earth is 0.0038 AU, about 1.5 lunar distances. It approaches Earth roughly once every ten years.
