= 2013 LX28 =

Near-Earth asteroid and quasi-satellite

2013 LX_{28}
Discovery
- Discovered by: Pan-STARRS
- Discovery date: 12 June 2013

Designations
- Minor planet category: Apollo asteroid; Venus crosser; Earth crosser

Orbital characteristics
- Epoch 13 January 2016 (JD 2457400.5)
- Uncertainty parameter 1
- Aphelion: 1.4543719 AU (217.57094 Gm)
- Perihelion: 0.5488609 AU (82.10842 Gm)
- Semi-major axis: 1.00161641 AU (149.839682 Gm)
- Eccentricity: 0.4520249
- Orbital period (sidereal): 1.00 yr (366.14 d)
- Mean anomaly: 61.458811°
- Mean motion: 0° 58^{m} 59.602^{s} /day
- Inclination: 49.97420°
- Longitude of ascending node: 76.679354°
- Argument of perihelion: 345.77666°
- Earth MOID: 0.373137 AU (55.8205 Gm)
- Jupiter MOID: 3.8786 AU (580.23 Gm)

Physical characteristics
- Dimensions: 130–300 m^{[a]}
- Absolute magnitude (H): 21.7

2013 LX_{28} is an asteroid, classified as a near-Earth object of the Apollo group that is a temporary quasi-satellite of the Earth, the third known Earth quasi-satellite.

== Discovery, orbit and physical properties ==
2013 LX_{28} was discovered on 12 June 2013 by the Pan-STARRS survey, and its discovery was announced in a Minor Planets Electronic Circular on 15 June. As of September 2014, it has been observed 26 times with a data-arc span of 349 days. It is an Apollo asteroid and its semi-major axis (1.0016 AU) is very similar to that of the Earth. It has relatively high orbital eccentricity (0.4521) and high orbital inclination (49.9761°). With an absolute magnitude of 21.7, it has a diameter in the range 130–300 m (for an assumed albedo range of 0.04–0.20).

== Quasi-satellite dynamical state and orbital evolution ==
2013 LX_{28} has been identified as an Earth quasi-satellite following a kidney-shaped retrograde orbit around the Earth.

== See also ==
- 164207 Cardea
- (277810) 2006 FV35
- 2014 OL339

== Notes ==
- This is assuming an albedo of 0.20–0.04.
