= 2022 YG =

Asteroid

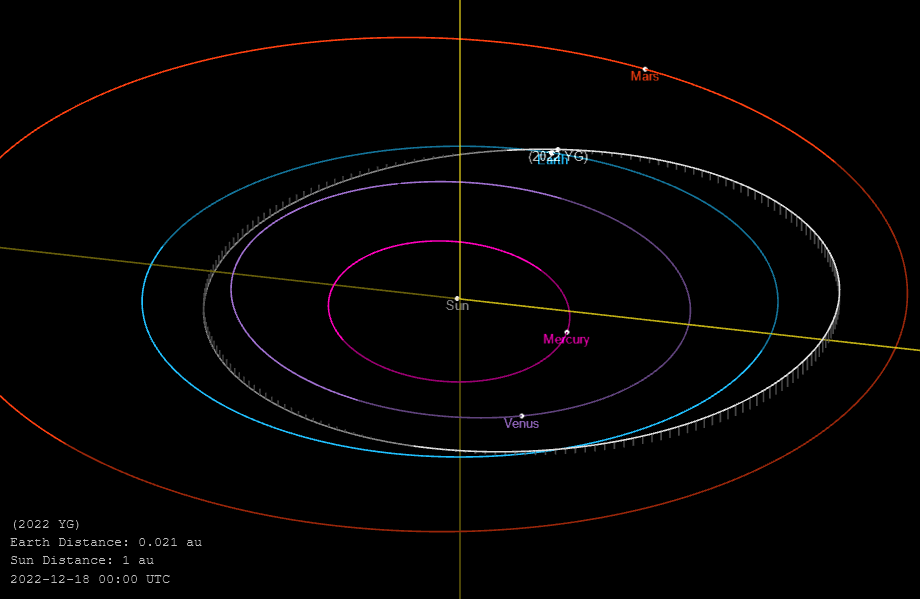
- Orbit of 2022 YG

Discovery
- Discovered by: G. Borisov
- Discovery site: MARGO Obs.
- Discovery date: 15 December 2022

Designations
- Minor planet category: NEO · Apollo

Orbital characteristics
- Epoch 17 October 2024 (JD 2460600.5)
- Uncertainty parameter 2
- Observation arc: 364 days
- Aphelion: 1.200 AU
- Perihelion: 0.806 AU
- Semi-major axis: 1.003 AU
- Eccentricity: 0.1961
- Orbital period (sidereal): 1.00 yr (366.90 days)
- Mean anomaly: 219.667°
- Mean motion: 0° 58^{m} 52.3^{s} / day
- Inclination: 2.364°
- Longitude of ascending node: 273.973°
- Argument of perihelion: 271.173°
- Earth MOID: 0.003133 AU (468,700 km; 1.219 LD)

Physical characteristics
- Absolute magnitude (H): 26.70

2022 YG is a near-Earth asteroid and a potential quasi-satellite of Earth, discovered by amateur astronomer Gennadiy Borisov at Nauchnyi, Crimea on 15 December 2022. It has an estimated diameter of 16–30 meters, given H of 26.7, and an albedo 4-15%. (Note: Absolute magnitude#Planets as diffuse spheres $$D = \frac{1329}{\sqrt{p}} \times 10^{-0.2H} \mathrm{km}.$$) Its closest approach to Earth was on 22 December 2022, at a distance of 0.0163 AU.
