= EURONEAR =

Minor planets discovered: 255 (DISCSTATUS May 2019)
see § List of discovered named minor planets

EURONEAR, the European Near Earth Asteroids Research, is a research project and network for the research and discovery of near-Earth objects and potentially hazardous asteroids using existing telescopes located in both hemispheres available to the members of the network. The Minor Planet Center directly credits EURONEAR with the discovery of few hundred minor planets since 2008, including 11 near-Earth asteroids.

== Institutions ==
Institutions which collaborate in this project are:

- fr:Institut de mécanique céleste et de calcul des éphémérides (IMCCE), France (May 2006)
- European Southern Observatory (ESO), Chile (Sep 2006)
- Universidad Católica del Norte Instituto de Astronomía, Chile (Mar 2007)
- Isaac Newton Group of Telescopes (ING), La Palma, Spain (Jan 2008)
- Instituto de Astrofísica de Canarias (IAC), Tenerife, Spain (Apr 2009)

The dates represent the time at which the institutions joined the project.

== List of named minor planets discovered with the ESO/MPG telescope in La Silla ==
257005 Arpadpal	11 March 2008
263516 Alexescu	13 March 2008
320790 Anestin	12 March 2008
330634 Boico	11 March 2008
346261 Alexandrescu	12 March 2008

358894 Demetrescu	12 March 2008
365761 Popovici	13 March 2008
369088 Marcus	12 March 2008
450931 Coculescu	11 March 2008
646626 Valentingrigore	11 March 2008

== List of near-Earth asteroids discovered with the Isaac Newton Telescope (INT) in La Palma ==
622577 Mioriţa (2014 LU_{14})	2 June 2014
2014 NL_{52}	10 July 2014
2014 OL339	29 July 2014
2014 SG_{143}	18 September 2014
2014 VP	4 November 2014

2015 HA_{117}	24 April 2015
2015 LT_{24}	15 June 2015
2015 VF_{65}	8 November 2015
2015 VG_{66}	7 November 2015

2018 VQ_{1}	1 November 2018
2018 VN_{3}	6 November 2018

2023 DZ2	27 February 2023

== See also ==
- Catalina Sky Survey
- Pan-STARRS
- List of near-Earth object observation projects

== Publications ==
- Popescu, M.; Vaduvescu, O.; De León, J.; Gherase, R. M.; Licandro, J.; Boacă, I. L.; Şonka, A. B.; Ashley, R. P.; Močnik, T.; Morate, D.; Predatu, M.; De Prá, M.; Fariña, C.; Stoev, H.; Díaz Alfaro, M.; Ordonez-Etxeberria, I.; López-Martínez, F.; Errmann, R. (2019). "Near-Earth asteroids spectroscopic survey at Isaac Newton Telescope". Astronomy & Astrophysics. 627: A124. arXiv:1905.12997. Bibcode:2019A&A...627A.124P. doi:10.1051/0004-6361/201935006. S2CID 170079055.
- Gorgan, Dorian; Vaduvescu, Ovidiu; Stefanut, Teodor; Bacu, Victor; Sabou, Adrian; Denisa Copandean Balazs; Nandra, Constantin; Boldea, Costin; Boldea, Afrodita; Predatu, Marian; Pinter, Viktoria; Stanica, Adrian (2019). "NEARBY Platform for Automatic Asteroids Detection and EURONEAR Surveys". arXiv:1903.03479 [astro-ph.IM].
- Vaduvescu, O.; MacIas, A. Aznar; Tudor, V.; Predatu, M.; Galád, A.; Gajdoš, Š.; Világi, J.; Stevance, H. F.; Errmann, R.; Unda-Sanzana, E.; Char, F.; Peixinho, N.; Popescu, M.; Sonka, A.; Cornea, R.; Suciu, O.; Toma, R.; Santos-Sanz, P.; Sota, A.; Licandro, J.; Serra-Ricart, M.; Morate, D.; Mocnik, T.; Diaz Alfaro, M.; Lopez-Martinez, F.; McCormac, J.; Humphries, N. (2017). "The EURONEAR Lightcurve Survey of Near Earth Asteroids". Earth, Moon, and Planets. 120 (2): 41. Bibcode:2017EM&P..120...41V. doi:10.1007/s11038-017-9506-9. hdl:10316/80202. S2CID 235516956.
- Vaduvescu, O.; et al. (2015). "First EURONEAR NEA discoveries from la Palma using the INT". Monthly Notices of the Royal Astronomical Society. 449 (2): 1614. Bibcode:2015MNRAS.449.1614V. doi:10.1093/mnras/stv266. hdl:10045/46262.
- Vaduvescu, O.; Birlan, M.; Tudorica, A.; Sonka, A.; Pozo, F. N.; Barr, A. D.; Asher, D. J.; Licandro, J.; Ortiz, J. L.; Unda-Sanzana, E.; Popescu, M.; Nedelcu, A.; Dumitru, D.; Toma, R.; Comsa, I.; Vancea, C.; Vidican, D.; Opriseanu, C.; Badescu, T.; Badea, M.; Constantinescu, M. (2011). "EURONEAR—Recovery, follow-up and discovery of NEAs and MBAs using large field 1-2 m telescopes". Planetary and Space Science. 59 (13): 1632. arXiv:1108.5780. Bibcode:2011P&SS...59.1632V. doi:10.1016/j.pss.2011.07.014. S2CID 119252263.
- Vaduvescu, O.; Curelaru, L.; Birlan, M.; Bocsa, G.; Serbanescu, L.; Tudorica, A.; Berthier, J. (2009). "EURONEAR: Data mining of asteroids and Near Earth Asteroids". Astronomische Nachrichten. 330 (7): 698. arXiv:0906.5030. Bibcode:2009AN....330..698V. doi:10.1002/asna.200811198. S2CID 15954634.
- Birlan, M.; Vaduvescu, O.; Tudorica, A.; Sonka, A.; Nedelcu, A.; Galad, A.; Colas, F.; Pozo n., F.; Barr d., A.; Toma, R.; Comsa, I.; Rocher, P.; Lainey, V.; Vidican, D.; Asher, D.; Opriseanu, C.; Vancea, C.; Colque, J. P.; Soto, C. P.; Rekola, R.; Unda-Sanzana, E. (2010). "More than 160 near Earth asteroids observed in the EURONEAR network". Astronomy and Astrophysics. 511: A40. Bibcode:2010A&A...511A..40B. doi:10.1051/0004-6361/200912865.
