= 2023 FW13 =

Near-Earth asteroid

2023 FW_{13}
Discovery
- Discovered by: Pan-STARRS
- Discovery site: Haleakala Observatory
- Discovery date: 28 March 2023

Designations
- Minor planet category: NEO; Apollo; Earth quasi-satellite

Orbital characteristics
- Epoch 26 February 2023 (JD 2460000.5)
- Uncertainty parameter 0
- Observation arc: 10.86 yr (3,967 d)
- Aphelion: 1.1781 AU
- Perihelion: 0.8225 AU
- Semi-major axis: 1.0003 AU
- Eccentricity: 0.1777
- Orbital period (sidereal): 1.0005 yr (365.42 days)
- Mean anomaly: 73.09°
- Mean motion: 0° 59^{m} 6.601^{s} / day
- Inclination: 2.7441°
- Longitude of ascending node: 70.557°
- Argument of perihelion: 354.40°
- Earth MOID: .0454762 AU (6,803,140 km; 17.6979 LD)

Physical characteristics
- Absolute magnitude (H): 26.01; 26.10

2023 FW_{13} is an asteroid that was spotted on 28 March 2023, from the Pan-STARRS telescope at Hawaii, United States. It circles the sun in sync with Earth in such a way that it appears to orbit Earth, but well outside Earth's Hill sphere, making it a quasi-satellite.

The orbit of 2023 FW_{13} has a 1:1 orbital resonance with Earth and is very eccentric, reaching out halfway to Mars and halfway to Venus. It is estimated that it has circled Earth since 100 B.C. and will continue until 3700 A.D. If those estimates are correct, it would significantly overtake 469219 Kamoʻoalewa as the most stable quasi-satellite of Earth.
