= Duncan Waldron =

Scottish planetarium astronomer and photographer

J. Duncan Waldron is a Scottish planetarium astronomer, photographer, and discoverer of two minor planets.

Duncan Waldron was born in Glasgow, Scotland. His first job was creating high quality reproductions of astronomical plates for the Royal Observatory in Edinburgh. On 10 October 1986 Waldron discovered the asteroid, 3753 Cruithne, while serving at the UK Schmidt Telescope at Siding Spring Observatory, and on 21 November 1986, also discovered asteroid 5577 Priestley. In 1995, Waldron was first exposed to Paint Shop Pro because of the Observatory's early exploration of digital photography. This software inspired Waldron to manipulate photographs for artistic purposes, creating kaleidoscopic patterns. In 1998, Duncan Waldron and his family moved to New South Wales, Australia.
