= (277810) 2006 FV35 =

Near-Earth asteroid

(277810) 2006 FV_{35}
Discovery
- Discovered by: Spacewatch
- Discovery site: Kitt Peak National Obs.
- Discovery date: 29 March 2006

Designations
- Minor planet category: Apollo · NEO

Orbital characteristics
- Epoch 21 November 2025 (JD 2461000.5)
- Uncertainty parameter 1
- Observation arc: 30.00 yr (10 959 days)
- Aphelion: 1.3794 AU
- Perihelion: 0.6235 AU
- Semi-major axis: 1.0014 AU
- Eccentricity: 0.3774
- Orbital period (sidereal): 1.002 yr (366.04 days)
- Mean anomaly: 76.6882°
- Mean motion: 0° 59^{m} 0.6^{s} / day
- Inclination: 7.1049°
- Longitude of ascending node: 179.46°
- Argument of perihelion: 170.77°
- Earth MOID: 0.1047 AU · 40.8 LD

Physical characteristics
- Mean diameter: 130–300 m
- Absolute magnitude (H): 21.72 · 21.915

(277810) 2006 FV_{35} is a sub-kilometer near-Earth asteroid in the dynamical Apollo asteroid group, discovered by Spacewatch at Kitt Peak National Observatory, Arizona, on 29 March 2006. It is a quasi-satellite of Earth. It is also notable for having a low delta-v requirement for rendezvous. Although its orbital period is almost exactly 1 year, the orbit of 2006 FV_{35} has a high eccentricity which causes it to cross the path of Venus.

== Discovery ==
2006 FV_{35} was discovered on 29 March 2006 by astronomer J. V. Scotti using the Spacewatch 0.9 meter telescope at Kitt Peak National Observatory. Scotti was working as a part of the Spacewatch survey project, and the asteroid's discovery was announced by the Minor Planet Center (MPC) in a Minor Planets Electronic Circular on 31 March. It was given the number (277810) by the MPC on 17 May 2011. As of November 2025, it remains unnamed; 2006 FV_{35} is its provisional designation.

== Orbit ==
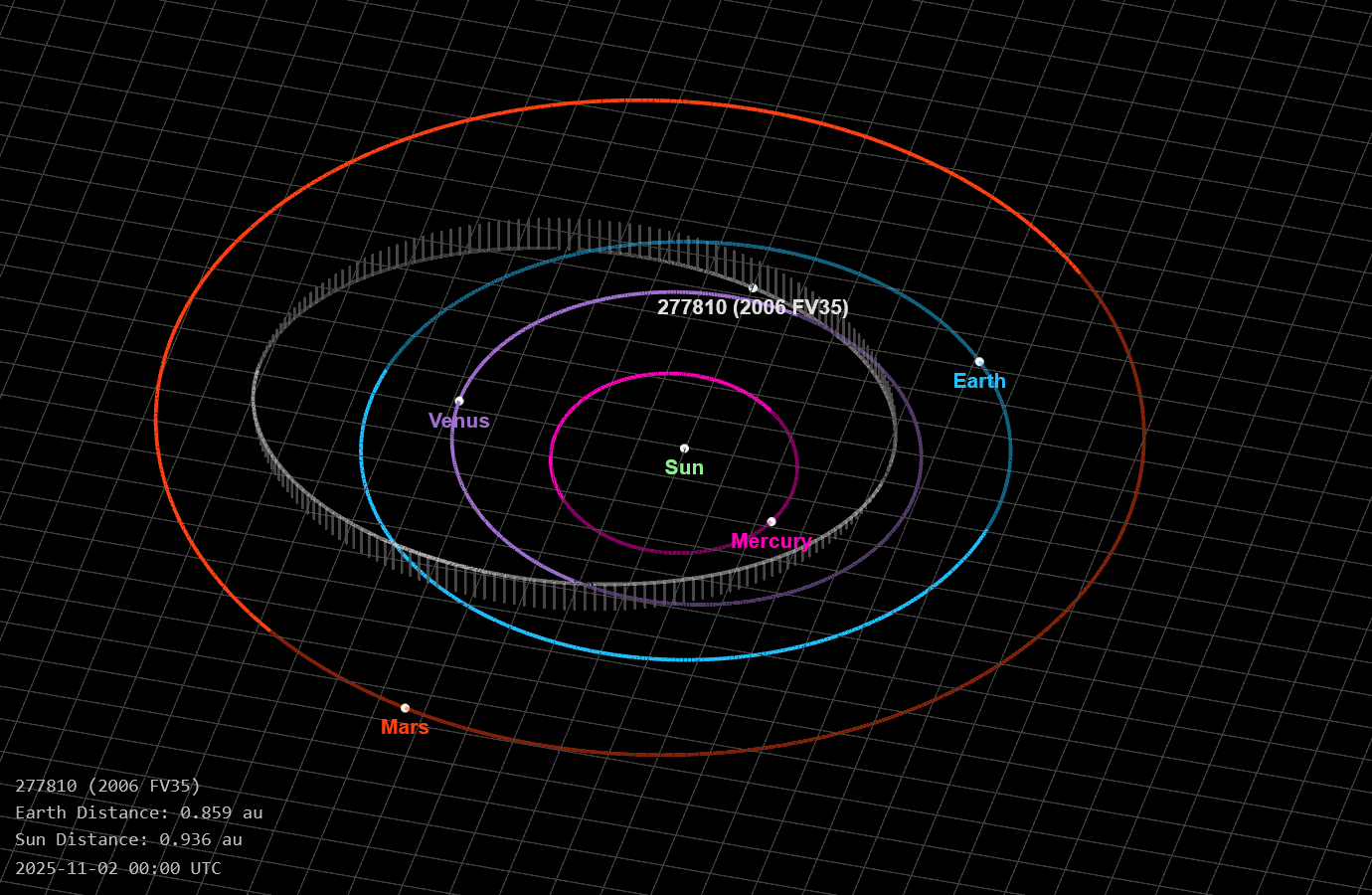
An orbital diagram of 2006 FV_{35}, with the ecliptic grid and the orbits of the inner planets shown.

2006 FV_{35} orbits the Sun with a semi-major axis of 1.001 astronomical units (AU), taking 366.04 days—almost exactly one year—to complete one orbit. It is classified as a near-Earth asteroid (NEA) and an Apollo asteroid; Apollo asteroids cross Earth's orbit and have semi-major axes above 1 AU. It has a low orbital inclination of 7.1° from the ecliptic plane and a high orbital eccentricity of 0.377, intersecting the orbit of Venus. Due to its high eccentricity, its distance to the Sun varies from 0.62 AU at perihelion to 1.38 AU at aphelion.

2006 FV_{35} is a quasi-satellite of Earth, participating in a 1:1 mean-motion resonance with the planet. Quasi-satellites have principal libration angles $\sigma = \lambda - \lambda_{p}$ (Note: Where $\lambda$ and $\lambda_{p}$ are the mean longitudes of 2006 FV_{35} and Earth, respectively) that librate around 0°, appearing to distantly orbit Earth from its perspective despite never entering its Hill sphere. Currently, 2006 FV_{35}'s principal resonant angle librates with an amplitude of 25° and a period of about 200 years. Its quasi-satellite loop is relatively wide, remaining about 0.64 AU distant from Earth. All of Earth's known quasi-satellites are temporary, and their orbits will eventually evolve into other NEA dynamical configurations in the future. 2006 FV_{35} has been a quasi-satellite for about 10,000 years, and will remain one for 800 more years before a close encounter with Venus (within 0.05 AU) perturbs it from that state. Thereafter, it will likely remain an Earth co-orbital, transitioning between horseshoe, tadpole, and passing configurations.

== Physical properties ==
2006 FV_{35}'s physical properties are poorly known. Using its absolute magnitude of 21.7, it has a calculated diameter of 130–300 metres (430–980 ft) for an assumed albedo of 0.20–0.04. (Note: An assumed albedo of 0.20 corresponds to an S-type asteroid while an assumed albedo of 0.04 corresponds to a C-type asteroid.)

== Accessibility ==
With a semi-major axis of almost exactly 1 AU, 2006 FV_{35} has a relatively low transfer energy from Earth. The delta-v required to transfer to the asteroid varies between 11 and 13 km/s; this change in delta-v oscillates over an approximately 200-year period with the current transfer cost near its maximum of 13 km/s.

== See also ==
- 164207 Cardea, another quasi-satellite of Earth
