= 164207 Cardea =

Sub-kilometer asteroid and quasi-satellite of Earth

- Cardea photographed by the Canada–France–Hawaii Telescope in February 2007

Discovery
- Discovered by: LINEAR
- Discovery site: Lincoln Lab's ETS
- Discovery date: 13 April 2004

Designations
- Pronunciation: /ˈkɑːrdiə/
- Named after: Cardea
- Alternative designations: 2004 GU_{9}
- Minor planet category: NEO · Apollo

Orbital characteristics
- Epoch 21 November 2025 (JD 2461000.5)
- Uncertainty parameter 0
- Observation arc: 8688 days (23.79 yr)
- Aphelion: 1.1372 AU (170.12 Gm)
- Perihelion: 0.8650 AU (129.40 Gm)
- Semi-major axis: 1.0011 AU (149.76 Gm)
- Eccentricity: 0.1359
- Orbital period (sidereal): 1.0017 yr (365.87 d)
- Mean anomaly: 97.3298°
- Mean motion: 0° 59^{m} 1.464^{s} / day
- Inclination: 13.6529°
- Longitude of ascending node: 38.3866°
- Longitude of perihelion: 280.55672±0.00007°
- Time of perihelion: 2456145.53817±0.00006 jd
- Argument of perihelion: 279.3410°
- Earth MOID: 0.0031 AU (460,000 km)

Physical characteristics
- Mean diameter: 163 m
- Geometric albedo: 0.219
- Absolute magnitude (H): 21.1

164207 Cardea (provisional designation 2004 GU_{9}) is a sub-kilometer asteroid, classified as a near-Earth object and potentially hazardous asteroid of the Apollo group. It is a quasi-satellite of Earth, a situation that should persist until around 2600, when it is expected to shift to a regular horseshoe orbit for a few thousand years.

On 14 April 2004 (with less than a 1-day observation arc), the Sentry Risk Table showed 180 virtual impactors. It was removed from the Sentry Risk Table 2 days later on 16 April 2004. As later precovery observations by Haleakala-AMOS from 2001 have been found, Cardea now has a well determined orbit with an observation arc of 24 years.

== Discovery and naming ==
This asteroid was discovered on 13 April 2004 by the Lincoln Near-Earth Asteroid Research (LINEAR) project near Socorro, New Mexico and given the provisional designation 2004 GU_{9}. Following the naming of 524522 Zoozve, a quasi-satellite of Venus, Radiolab and the International Astronomical Union held a public naming campaign for this quasi-satellite from June to September 2024. Seven finalist names were revealed in December 2024, with the names being Bakunawa, Cardea, Ehaema, Enkidu, Ótr, Tarriaksuk, and Tecciztecatl. The winning name was Cardea, the Roman goddess of hinges. The name was announced by the International Astronomical Union on 13 January 2025.

== Orbit ==
Cardea orbits the Sun with a semi-major axis of 1.001 astronomical units (AU), taking 365.87 days to complete one orbit. It is classified as a near-Earth asteroid (NEA) and an Apollo asteroid; Apollo asteroids are NEAs that cross Earth's orbit but have semi-major axes above 1 AU. Its orbit is inclined by 13.653° with respect to the ecliptic plane. Along its orbit, its distance from the Sun varies from 0.865 AU at perihelion to 1.137 AU at aphelion due to its moderate orbital eccentricity of 0.136.

Cardea is in a 1:1 mean-motion resonance with Earth, and it currently orbits in a quasi-satellite configuration. Quasi-satellites have principal libration angles $\sigma = \lambda - \lambda_{p}$ (Note: Where $\lambda$ and $\lambda_{p}$ are the mean longitudes of Cardea and Earth, respectively) that librate around 0°, appearing to distantly orbit Earth from its perspective despite directly orbiting the Sun. All Earth quasi-satellites are temporary; Cardea has been a quasi-satellite for about 600 years, and will eventually lose its status as one in about 500 years. Perturbations from Venus play a role in destabilizing Cardea from its quasi-satellite configuration even though their orbits do not cross. Currently, the libration of Cardea's $\sigma$ has an amplitude of 8–10°, with a libration period of 70 years. After exiting its quasi-satellite phase, it will enter a horseshoe configuration.

== Physical characteristics ==
Cardea has a diameter of 163 metres (535 ft) and an albedo of 0.219.

Animation of 164207 Cardea's orbit from 1600 to 2500

Relative to Sun and Earth

Around Earth

Around Sun

Sun · Earth · Cardea

== See also ==
- (277810) 2006 FV35, another quasi-satellite of Earth
