= List of minor planets: 646001–647000 =

The following is a partial list of minor planets, running from minor-planet number 646001 through 647000, inclusive. The primary data for this and other partial lists is based on JPL's "Small-Body Orbital Elements" and data available from the Minor Planet Center. Critical list information is also provided by the MPC, unless otherwise specified from Lowell Observatory. A detailed description of the table's columns and additional sources are given on the main page including a complete list of every page in this series, and a statistical break-up on the dynamical classification of minor planets.

Also see the summary list of all named bodies in numerical and alphabetical order, and the corresponding naming citations for the number range of this particular list. New namings may only be added to this list after official publication, as the preannouncement of names is condemned by the Working Group for Small Bodies Nomenclature of the International Astronomical Union.

Near-Earth obj.	MBA (inner)	MBA (outer)	Centaur
Mars-crosser	MBA (middle)	Jupiter trojan	Trans-Neptunian obj.
Unclassified

== 646001–646100 ==
Designation			Discovery			Properties		Ref
Permanent	Provisional	Named after	Date	Site	Discoverer(s)	Category	Diam.	Ref
646001	2007 XS_{64}	—	December 5, 2007	Mount Lemmon	Mount Lemmon Survey	·	1.7 km	MPC · JPL
646002	2007 XY_{64}	—	February 27, 2009	Kitt Peak	Spacewatch	KOR	1.3 km	MPC · JPL
646003	2007 XZ_{64}	—	September 29, 2010	Mount Lemmon	Mount Lemmon Survey	·	500 m	MPC · JPL
646004	2007 XE_{65}	—	December 5, 2007	Kitt Peak	Spacewatch	EOS	1.6 km	MPC · JPL
646005	2007 XH_{65}	—	October 20, 2012	Mount Lemmon	Mount Lemmon Survey	·	2.4 km	MPC · JPL
646006	2007 XM_{65}	—	December 6, 2007	Kitt Peak	Spacewatch	·	920 m	MPC · JPL
646007	2007 XO_{65}	—	June 19, 2015	Haleakala	Pan-STARRS 1	·	2.2 km	MPC · JPL
646008	2007 XY_{65}	—	December 4, 2007	Kitt Peak	Spacewatch	·	2.7 km	MPC · JPL
646009	2007 XA_{66}	—	October 26, 2011	Haleakala	Pan-STARRS 1	·	840 m	MPC · JPL
646010	2007 XQ_{66}	—	December 4, 2007	Kitt Peak	Spacewatch	·	2.7 km	MPC · JPL
646011	2007 XS_{66}	—	September 17, 2017	Haleakala	Pan-STARRS 1	·	1.9 km	MPC · JPL
646012	2007 XK_{67}	—	November 8, 2010	Mount Lemmon	Mount Lemmon Survey	·	570 m	MPC · JPL
646013	2007 XE_{68}	—	January 30, 2017	Haleakala	Pan-STARRS 1	EUN	1.0 km	MPC · JPL
646014	2007 XS_{68}	—	December 5, 2007	Kitt Peak	Spacewatch	·	1.7 km	MPC · JPL
646015	2007 XR_{69}	—	December 5, 2007	Kitt Peak	Spacewatch	·	2.6 km	MPC · JPL
646016	2007 XF_{70}	—	December 4, 2007	Mount Lemmon	Mount Lemmon Survey	·	480 m	MPC · JPL
646017	2007 XZ_{70}	—	December 3, 2007	Kitt Peak	Spacewatch	·	1.3 km	MPC · JPL
646018	2007 XB_{71}	—	December 5, 2007	Kitt Peak	Spacewatch	·	3.1 km	MPC · JPL
646019	2007 XF_{71}	—	December 5, 2007	Kitt Peak	Spacewatch	·	2.4 km	MPC · JPL
646020	2007 XB_{73}	—	December 5, 2007	Kitt Peak	Spacewatch	·	1.2 km	MPC · JPL
646021	2007 YL_{2}	—	December 16, 2007	Great Shefford	Birtwhistle, P.	·	1.2 km	MPC · JPL
646022	2007 YC_{5}	—	December 16, 2007	Kitt Peak	Spacewatch	·	3.0 km	MPC · JPL
646023	2007 YB_{6}	—	October 23, 2003	Kitt Peak	Spacewatch	·	1.3 km	MPC · JPL
646024	2007 YZ_{7}	—	July 8, 2003	Palomar	NEAT	·	1.0 km	MPC · JPL
646025	2007 YD_{8}	—	December 4, 2007	Kitt Peak	Spacewatch	·	910 m	MPC · JPL
646026	2007 YG_{10}	—	December 16, 2007	Mount Lemmon	Mount Lemmon Survey	·	2.2 km	MPC · JPL
646027	2007 YC_{13}	—	December 17, 2007	Mount Lemmon	Mount Lemmon Survey	·	1.2 km	MPC · JPL
646028	2007 YH_{15}	—	December 5, 2007	Kitt Peak	Spacewatch	·	2.0 km	MPC · JPL
646029	2007 YT_{15}	—	December 16, 2007	Kitt Peak	Spacewatch	EOS	1.8 km	MPC · JPL
646030	2007 YH_{16}	—	December 16, 2007	Kitt Peak	Spacewatch	·	980 m	MPC · JPL
646031	2007 YX_{17}	—	December 16, 2007	Kitt Peak	Spacewatch	EOS	1.8 km	MPC · JPL
646032	2007 YC_{18}	—	December 16, 2007	Kitt Peak	Spacewatch	EOS	1.5 km	MPC · JPL
646033	2007 YB_{22}	—	December 4, 2007	Kitt Peak	Spacewatch	·	870 m	MPC · JPL
646034	2007 YD_{22}	—	December 16, 2007	Kitt Peak	Spacewatch	·	940 m	MPC · JPL
646035	2007 YL_{23}	—	November 12, 2007	Mount Lemmon	Mount Lemmon Survey	·	790 m	MPC · JPL
646036	2007 YU_{23}	—	October 14, 2001	Apache Point	SDSS Collaboration	EOS	1.4 km	MPC · JPL
646037	2007 YM_{25}	—	December 18, 2007	Mount Lemmon	Mount Lemmon Survey	·	2.1 km	MPC · JPL
646038	2007 YZ_{25}	—	December 18, 2007	Mount Lemmon	Mount Lemmon Survey	·	1.6 km	MPC · JPL
646039	2007 YL_{26}	—	December 18, 2007	Mount Lemmon	Mount Lemmon Survey	EOS	2.5 km	MPC · JPL
646040	2007 YF_{29}	—	November 11, 2007	Mount Lemmon	Mount Lemmon Survey	EUN	1.2 km	MPC · JPL
646041	2007 YF_{30}	—	November 9, 2007	Kitt Peak	Spacewatch	·	2.7 km	MPC · JPL
646042	2007 YC_{31}	—	December 15, 2007	Kitt Peak	Spacewatch	PHO	980 m	MPC · JPL
646043	2007 YN_{32}	—	December 4, 2007	Mount Lemmon	Mount Lemmon Survey	·	2.6 km	MPC · JPL
646044	2007 YR_{32}	—	November 20, 2007	Kitt Peak	Spacewatch	·	2.0 km	MPC · JPL
646045	2007 YW_{32}	—	August 27, 2006	Kitt Peak	Spacewatch	·	1.8 km	MPC · JPL
646046	2007 YJ_{33}	—	November 14, 2007	Kitt Peak	Spacewatch	·	940 m	MPC · JPL
646047	2007 YT_{33}	—	November 20, 2007	Kitt Peak	Spacewatch	·	2.7 km	MPC · JPL
646048	2007 YD_{36}	—	December 4, 2007	Kitt Peak	Spacewatch	·	900 m	MPC · JPL
646049	2007 YJ_{37}	—	December 30, 2007	Mount Lemmon	Mount Lemmon Survey	·	1.9 km	MPC · JPL
646050	2007 YK_{37}	—	December 17, 2007	Kitt Peak	Spacewatch	·	690 m	MPC · JPL
646051	2007 YB_{48}	—	December 18, 2007	Kitt Peak	Spacewatch	LIX	2.7 km	MPC · JPL
646052	2007 YY_{49}	—	December 28, 2007	Kitt Peak	Spacewatch	LIX	3.5 km	MPC · JPL
646053	2007 YB_{50}	—	November 8, 2007	Mount Lemmon	Mount Lemmon Survey	(5)	1.2 km	MPC · JPL
646054	2007 YL_{50}	—	December 20, 2007	Kitt Peak	Spacewatch	·	1.0 km	MPC · JPL
646055	2007 YU_{53}	—	December 31, 2007	Mount Lemmon	Mount Lemmon Survey	·	2.4 km	MPC · JPL
646056	2007 YD_{54}	—	December 17, 2007	Mount Lemmon	Mount Lemmon Survey	·	740 m	MPC · JPL
646057	2007 YH_{54}	—	December 16, 2007	Mount Lemmon	Mount Lemmon Survey	EOS	1.8 km	MPC · JPL
646058	2007 YF_{55}	—	December 31, 2007	Mount Lemmon	Mount Lemmon Survey	·	2.7 km	MPC · JPL
646059	2007 YY_{57}	—	August 21, 2006	Kitt Peak	Spacewatch	·	2.1 km	MPC · JPL
646060	2007 YB_{67}	—	December 31, 2007	Kitt Peak	Spacewatch	GAL	1.4 km	MPC · JPL
646061	2007 YQ_{68}	—	December 17, 2007	Mount Lemmon	Mount Lemmon Survey	·	2.7 km	MPC · JPL
646062	2007 YJ_{70}	—	December 31, 2007	Mount Lemmon	Mount Lemmon Survey	·	510 m	MPC · JPL
646063	2007 YT_{70}	—	November 14, 2007	Kitt Peak	Spacewatch	·	2.3 km	MPC · JPL
646064	2007 YO_{71}	—	December 17, 2007	Kitt Peak	Spacewatch	·	1.8 km	MPC · JPL
646065	2007 YF_{73}	—	December 29, 2007	Črni Vrh	Mikuž, H.	·	2.3 km	MPC · JPL
646066	2007 YX_{74}	—	December 17, 2007	Mount Lemmon	Mount Lemmon Survey	·	1 km	MPC · JPL
646067	2007 YC_{76}	—	December 16, 2007	Mount Lemmon	Mount Lemmon Survey	·	1.2 km	MPC · JPL
646068	2007 YN_{77}	—	December 30, 2007	Mount Lemmon	Mount Lemmon Survey	·	2.6 km	MPC · JPL
646069	2007 YP_{77}	—	December 31, 2007	Mount Lemmon	Mount Lemmon Survey	·	540 m	MPC · JPL
646070	2007 YZ_{77}	—	December 18, 2007	Kitt Peak	Spacewatch	EOS	1.9 km	MPC · JPL
646071	2007 YA_{78}	—	December 30, 2007	Kitt Peak	Spacewatch	·	3.1 km	MPC · JPL
646072	2007 YB_{78}	—	October 18, 2012	Haleakala	Pan-STARRS 1	THM	1.8 km	MPC · JPL
646073	2007 YM_{78}	—	November 1, 2007	Kitt Peak	Spacewatch	·	1.7 km	MPC · JPL
646074	2007 YQ_{78}	—	October 8, 2012	Mount Lemmon	Mount Lemmon Survey	·	1.7 km	MPC · JPL
646075	2007 YT_{78}	—	December 30, 2007	Kitt Peak	Spacewatch	·	640 m	MPC · JPL
646076	2007 YA_{79}	—	January 9, 2014	Haleakala	Pan-STARRS 1	·	2.3 km	MPC · JPL
646077	2007 YD_{79}	—	July 4, 2016	Haleakala	Pan-STARRS 1	EOS	1.3 km	MPC · JPL
646078	2007 YN_{79}	—	December 18, 2007	Mount Lemmon	Mount Lemmon Survey	·	2.7 km	MPC · JPL
646079	2007 YY_{79}	—	September 25, 2017	Haleakala	Pan-STARRS 1	·	1.9 km	MPC · JPL
646080	2007 YN_{80}	—	October 22, 2012	Haleakala	Pan-STARRS 1	·	1.4 km	MPC · JPL
646081	2007 YP_{80}	—	December 20, 2007	Kitt Peak	Spacewatch	·	3.1 km	MPC · JPL
646082	2007 YR_{80}	—	March 5, 2013	Mount Lemmon	Mount Lemmon Survey	·	1.2 km	MPC · JPL
646083	2007 YG_{81}	—	November 25, 2011	Haleakala	Pan-STARRS 1	MAR	790 m	MPC · JPL
646084	2007 YM_{81}	—	December 31, 2007	Kitt Peak	Spacewatch	·	1.7 km	MPC · JPL
646085	2007 YP_{81}	—	December 30, 2007	Kitt Peak	Spacewatch	·	1.7 km	MPC · JPL
646086	2007 YQ_{81}	—	December 31, 2007	Kitt Peak	Spacewatch	·	2.7 km	MPC · JPL
646087	2007 YU_{81}	—	December 31, 2007	Mount Lemmon	Mount Lemmon Survey	MAR	830 m	MPC · JPL
646088	2007 YX_{81}	—	October 19, 2012	Haleakala	Pan-STARRS 1	·	2.4 km	MPC · JPL
646089	2007 YB_{82}	—	December 20, 2007	Kitt Peak	Spacewatch	EUP	2.7 km	MPC · JPL
646090	2007 YM_{82}	—	March 28, 2015	Haleakala	Pan-STARRS 1	EOS	1.5 km	MPC · JPL
646091	2007 YW_{82}	—	December 16, 2007	Mount Lemmon	Mount Lemmon Survey	·	2.2 km	MPC · JPL
646092	2007 YB_{83}	—	December 4, 2012	Mount Lemmon	Mount Lemmon Survey	·	1.8 km	MPC · JPL
646093	2007 YD_{83}	—	November 25, 2012	Kitt Peak	Spacewatch	·	2.1 km	MPC · JPL
646094	2007 YE_{83}	—	December 17, 2007	Mount Lemmon	Mount Lemmon Survey	·	2.7 km	MPC · JPL
646095	2007 YH_{83}	—	July 27, 2011	Haleakala	Pan-STARRS 1	·	2.1 km	MPC · JPL
646096	2007 YM_{83}	—	September 21, 2017	Haleakala	Pan-STARRS 1	EOS	1.5 km	MPC · JPL
646097	2007 YO_{83}	—	December 20, 2007	Mount Lemmon	Mount Lemmon Survey	LIX	2.9 km	MPC · JPL
646098	2007 YB_{84}	—	November 14, 2012	Mount Lemmon	Mount Lemmon Survey	·	1.7 km	MPC · JPL
646099	2007 YJ_{84}	—	January 30, 2017	Haleakala	Pan-STARRS 1	·	1.1 km	MPC · JPL
646100	2007 YK_{84}	—	May 19, 2015	Cerro Tololo	DECam	·	2.1 km	MPC · JPL

== 646101–646200 ==
back to top

Designation			Discovery			Properties		Ref
Permanent	Provisional	Named after	Date	Site	Discoverer(s)	Category	Diam.	Ref
646101	2007 YR_{84}	—	October 22, 2012	Haleakala	Pan-STARRS 1	·	1.7 km	MPC · JPL
646102	2007 YS_{84}	—	December 19, 2007	Mount Lemmon	Mount Lemmon Survey	·	2.9 km	MPC · JPL
646103	2007 YA_{85}	—	December 16, 2007	Mount Lemmon	Mount Lemmon Survey	·	2.8 km	MPC · JPL
646104	2007 YD_{85}	—	May 20, 2015	Cerro Tololo	DECam	·	2.0 km	MPC · JPL
646105	2007 YH_{85}	—	October 23, 2012	Haleakala	Pan-STARRS 1	·	2.3 km	MPC · JPL
646106	2007 YL_{85}	—	September 23, 2015	Haleakala	Pan-STARRS 1	·	790 m	MPC · JPL
646107	2007 YP_{85}	—	November 7, 2012	Haleakala	Pan-STARRS 1	·	2.2 km	MPC · JPL
646108	2007 YY_{85}	—	December 31, 2007	Mount Lemmon	Mount Lemmon Survey	·	2.4 km	MPC · JPL
646109	2007 YR_{86}	—	January 2, 2016	Haleakala	Pan-STARRS 1	·	720 m	MPC · JPL
646110	2007 YS_{86}	—	November 1, 2013	Kitt Peak	Spacewatch	·	910 m	MPC · JPL
646111	2007 YG_{87}	—	December 30, 2007	Kitt Peak	Spacewatch	·	1.4 km	MPC · JPL
646112	2007 YL_{88}	—	December 31, 2007	Kitt Peak	Spacewatch	·	1.2 km	MPC · JPL
646113	2007 YU_{88}	—	October 10, 2017	Mount Lemmon	Mount Lemmon Survey	EUP	3.6 km	MPC · JPL
646114	2007 YE_{89}	—	December 16, 2007	Mount Lemmon	Mount Lemmon Survey	·	790 m	MPC · JPL
646115	2007 YF_{89}	—	December 18, 2007	Mount Lemmon	Mount Lemmon Survey	·	1.1 km	MPC · JPL
646116	2007 YG_{89}	—	June 21, 2014	Mount Lemmon	Mount Lemmon Survey	·	960 m	MPC · JPL
646117	2007 YP_{89}	—	November 6, 2013	Haleakala	Pan-STARRS 1	·	2.8 km	MPC · JPL
646118	2007 YS_{89}	—	December 28, 2007	Kitt Peak	Spacewatch	EUN	840 m	MPC · JPL
646119	2007 YZ_{90}	—	December 30, 2007	Mount Lemmon	Mount Lemmon Survey	·	570 m	MPC · JPL
646120	2007 YA_{91}	—	December 16, 2007	Kitt Peak	Spacewatch	·	1.6 km	MPC · JPL
646121	2007 YE_{91}	—	December 16, 2007	Mount Lemmon	Mount Lemmon Survey	·	1.0 km	MPC · JPL
646122	2007 YF_{91}	—	December 30, 2007	Mount Lemmon	Mount Lemmon Survey	·	2.1 km	MPC · JPL
646123	2007 YG_{91}	—	December 19, 2007	Mount Lemmon	Mount Lemmon Survey	·	2.1 km	MPC · JPL
646124	2007 YJ_{91}	—	December 18, 2007	Kitt Peak	Spacewatch	VER	2.5 km	MPC · JPL
646125	2007 YT_{91}	—	December 30, 2007	Kitt Peak	Spacewatch	·	2.2 km	MPC · JPL
646126	2007 YA_{92}	—	December 17, 2007	Bergisch Gladbach	W. Bickel	·	2.9 km	MPC · JPL
646127	2007 YE_{92}	—	December 18, 2007	Mount Lemmon	Mount Lemmon Survey	·	2.2 km	MPC · JPL
646128	2007 YN_{92}	—	December 30, 2007	Kitt Peak	Spacewatch	·	1.5 km	MPC · JPL
646129	2007 YY_{92}	—	December 18, 2007	Mount Lemmon	Mount Lemmon Survey	·	2.3 km	MPC · JPL
646130	2007 YX_{93}	—	December 30, 2007	Mount Lemmon	Mount Lemmon Survey	·	1.2 km	MPC · JPL
646131	2007 YU_{94}	—	December 30, 2007	Kitt Peak	Spacewatch	·	410 m	MPC · JPL
646132	2007 YY_{95}	—	December 16, 2007	Kitt Peak	Spacewatch	·	2.5 km	MPC · JPL
646133	2007 YJ_{96}	—	December 17, 2007	Mount Lemmon	Mount Lemmon Survey	EOS	1.8 km	MPC · JPL
646134	2008 AT_{3}	—	January 9, 2008	Eskridge	G. Hug	·	2.9 km	MPC · JPL
646135	2008 AQ_{7}	—	December 14, 2007	Mount Lemmon	Mount Lemmon Survey	·	1.4 km	MPC · JPL
646136	2008 AX_{7}	—	January 10, 2008	Kitt Peak	Spacewatch	·	600 m	MPC · JPL
646137	2008 AJ_{9}	—	January 10, 2008	Mount Lemmon	Mount Lemmon Survey	EOS	1.8 km	MPC · JPL
646138	2008 AX_{9}	—	January 10, 2008	Mount Lemmon	Mount Lemmon Survey	·	870 m	MPC · JPL
646139	2008 AD_{10}	—	January 10, 2008	Mount Lemmon	Mount Lemmon Survey	·	2.2 km	MPC · JPL
646140	2008 AC_{13}	—	January 10, 2008	Mount Lemmon	Mount Lemmon Survey	·	1.0 km	MPC · JPL
646141	2008 AL_{13}	—	January 10, 2008	Mount Lemmon	Mount Lemmon Survey	·	2.0 km	MPC · JPL
646142	2008 AT_{13}	—	September 27, 2006	Mount Lemmon	Mount Lemmon Survey	·	2.0 km	MPC · JPL
646143	2008 AH_{15}	—	January 10, 2008	Kitt Peak	Spacewatch	EOS	1.6 km	MPC · JPL
646144	2008 AM_{17}	—	January 10, 2008	Kitt Peak	Spacewatch	·	2.7 km	MPC · JPL
646145	2008 AH_{18}	—	December 30, 2007	Kitt Peak	Spacewatch	·	840 m	MPC · JPL
646146	2008 AS_{20}	—	January 10, 2008	Mount Lemmon	Mount Lemmon Survey	·	2.3 km	MPC · JPL
646147	2008 AJ_{21}	—	March 10, 2005	Mount Lemmon	Mount Lemmon Survey	fast	620 m	MPC · JPL
646148	2008 AN_{21}	—	January 10, 2008	Mount Lemmon	Mount Lemmon Survey	·	610 m	MPC · JPL
646149	2008 AL_{24}	—	September 19, 2006	Siding Spring	SSS	T_{j} (2.98)	3.2 km	MPC · JPL
646150	2008 AX_{26}	—	January 10, 2008	Kitt Peak	Spacewatch	·	2.2 km	MPC · JPL
646151	2008 AO_{32}	—	December 19, 2007	Mount Lemmon	Mount Lemmon Survey	·	1.0 km	MPC · JPL
646152	2008 AK_{34}	—	December 30, 2007	Kitt Peak	Spacewatch	(5)	990 m	MPC · JPL
646153	2008 AK_{35}	—	December 30, 2007	Kitt Peak	Spacewatch	T_{j} (2.96)	3.9 km	MPC · JPL
646154	2008 AM_{36}	—	January 10, 2008	Kitt Peak	Spacewatch	·	2.3 km	MPC · JPL
646155	2008 AB_{38}	—	January 10, 2008	Kitt Peak	Spacewatch	·	2.8 km	MPC · JPL
646156	2008 AA_{39}	—	December 31, 2007	Kitt Peak	Spacewatch	·	2.0 km	MPC · JPL
646157	2008 AG_{42}	—	April 27, 2009	Kitt Peak	Spacewatch	·	2.4 km	MPC · JPL
646158	2008 AV_{45}	—	November 13, 2007	Kitt Peak	Spacewatch	·	2.8 km	MPC · JPL
646159	2008 AD_{52}	—	December 5, 2007	Mount Lemmon	Mount Lemmon Survey	·	3.2 km	MPC · JPL
646160	2008 AM_{53}	—	January 11, 2008	Kitt Peak	Spacewatch	·	2.5 km	MPC · JPL
646161	2008 AP_{53}	—	January 11, 2008	Kitt Peak	Spacewatch	EOS	1.5 km	MPC · JPL
646162	2008 AH_{55}	—	December 31, 2007	Mount Lemmon	Mount Lemmon Survey	·	2.2 km	MPC · JPL
646163	2008 AP_{56}	—	September 15, 2006	Kitt Peak	Spacewatch	·	1.6 km	MPC · JPL
646164	2008 AO_{57}	—	January 11, 2008	Kitt Peak	Spacewatch	·	840 m	MPC · JPL
646165	2008 AY_{59}	—	December 31, 2007	Kitt Peak	Spacewatch	·	1.1 km	MPC · JPL
646166	2008 AG_{60}	—	January 11, 2008	Kitt Peak	Spacewatch	·	1.9 km	MPC · JPL
646167	2008 AU_{61}	—	January 11, 2008	Kitt Peak	Spacewatch	·	590 m	MPC · JPL
646168	2008 AJ_{65}	—	January 11, 2008	Mount Lemmon	Mount Lemmon Survey	·	600 m	MPC · JPL
646169	2008 AO_{65}	—	December 31, 2007	Kitt Peak	Spacewatch	·	2.5 km	MPC · JPL
646170	2008 AW_{67}	—	January 11, 2008	Kitt Peak	Spacewatch	·	1.7 km	MPC · JPL
646171	2008 AW_{72}	—	December 6, 2007	Kitt Peak	Spacewatch	EOS	1.9 km	MPC · JPL
646172	2008 AJ_{75}	—	January 11, 2008	Mount Lemmon	Mount Lemmon Survey	·	2.6 km	MPC · JPL
646173	2008 AG_{76}	—	January 11, 2008	Kitt Peak	Spacewatch	·	2.6 km	MPC · JPL
646174	2008 AF_{78}	—	January 12, 2008	Kitt Peak	Spacewatch	·	2.4 km	MPC · JPL
646175	2008 AH_{82}	—	January 14, 2008	Kitt Peak	Spacewatch	EOS	1.8 km	MPC · JPL
646176	2008 AO_{89}	—	January 13, 2008	Kitt Peak	Spacewatch	·	3.3 km	MPC · JPL
646177	2008 AR_{89}	—	January 13, 2008	Kitt Peak	Spacewatch	·	560 m	MPC · JPL
646178	2008 AA_{90}	—	January 13, 2008	Kitt Peak	Spacewatch	·	890 m	MPC · JPL
646179	2008 AN_{91}	—	November 8, 2007	Mount Lemmon	Mount Lemmon Survey	·	2.9 km	MPC · JPL
646180	2008 AO_{91}	—	January 13, 2008	Kitt Peak	Spacewatch	·	2.0 km	MPC · JPL
646181	2008 AV_{95}	—	September 28, 2006	Kitt Peak	Spacewatch	·	2.1 km	MPC · JPL
646182	2008 AT_{96}	—	December 18, 2007	Mount Lemmon	Mount Lemmon Survey	·	600 m	MPC · JPL
646183	2008 AO_{97}	—	December 18, 2007	Mount Lemmon	Mount Lemmon Survey	·	2.7 km	MPC · JPL
646184	2008 AW_{98}	—	January 14, 2008	Kitt Peak	Spacewatch	·	720 m	MPC · JPL
646185	2008 AK_{99}	—	January 14, 2008	Kitt Peak	Spacewatch	·	1.7 km	MPC · JPL
646186	2008 AJ_{117}	—	January 13, 2008	Kitt Peak	Spacewatch	·	500 m	MPC · JPL
646187	2008 AF_{118}	—	January 13, 2008	Kitt Peak	Spacewatch	·	2.0 km	MPC · JPL
646188	2008 AQ_{118}	—	January 6, 2008	Mauna Kea	P. A. Wiegert	cubewano (hot)	292 km	MPC · JPL
646189	2008 AV_{119}	—	January 6, 2008	Mauna Kea	P. A. Wiegert	·	1.1 km	MPC · JPL
646190	2008 AR_{120}	—	January 6, 2008	Mauna Kea	P. A. Wiegert	·	2.4 km	MPC · JPL
646191	2008 AE_{128}	—	September 27, 2006	Kitt Peak	Spacewatch	·	1.9 km	MPC · JPL
646192	2008 AF_{128}	—	January 11, 2008	Kitt Peak	Spacewatch	·	2.3 km	MPC · JPL
646193	2008 AW_{128}	—	January 2, 2008	Bergisch Gladbach	W. Bickel	·	860 m	MPC · JPL
646194	2008 AA_{130}	—	March 23, 2003	Apache Point	SDSS Collaboration	·	2.0 km	MPC · JPL
646195	2008 AS_{131}	—	January 11, 2008	Kitt Peak	Spacewatch	(5)	1.0 km	MPC · JPL
646196	2008 AN_{133}	—	December 30, 2007	Mount Lemmon	Mount Lemmon Survey	·	1.4 km	MPC · JPL
646197	2008 AN_{139}	—	January 11, 2008	Catalina	CSS	H	500 m	MPC · JPL
646198	2008 AV_{139}	—	January 12, 2008	Mount Lemmon	Mount Lemmon Survey	·	610 m	MPC · JPL
646199	2008 AP_{140}	—	August 31, 2017	Mount Lemmon	Mount Lemmon Survey	·	2.9 km	MPC · JPL
646200	2008 AT_{140}	—	October 12, 2006	Kitt Peak	Spacewatch	EOS	1.7 km	MPC · JPL

== 646201–646300 ==
back to top

Designation			Discovery			Properties		Ref
Permanent	Provisional	Named after	Date	Site	Discoverer(s)	Category	Diam.	Ref
646201	2008 AX_{140}	—	January 15, 2008	Mount Lemmon	Mount Lemmon Survey	·	2.9 km	MPC · JPL
646202	2008 AA_{141}	—	July 30, 2017	Haleakala	Pan-STARRS 1	·	1.9 km	MPC · JPL
646203	2008 AT_{141}	—	June 7, 2016	Haleakala	Pan-STARRS 1	·	3.4 km	MPC · JPL
646204	2008 AO_{142}	—	January 11, 2008	Kitt Peak	Spacewatch	·	2.1 km	MPC · JPL
646205	2008 AQ_{142}	—	January 11, 2008	Kitt Peak	Spacewatch	·	1.9 km	MPC · JPL
646206	2008 AZ_{142}	—	January 11, 2008	Kitt Peak	Spacewatch	·	1.6 km	MPC · JPL
646207	2008 AE_{143}	—	January 11, 2008	Kitt Peak	Spacewatch	·	2.2 km	MPC · JPL
646208	2008 AF_{143}	—	October 19, 2011	Haleakala	Pan-STARRS 1	·	1.7 km	MPC · JPL
646209	2008 AX_{143}	—	May 6, 2014	Haleakala	Pan-STARRS 1	·	1.1 km	MPC · JPL
646210	2008 AY_{143}	—	January 12, 2008	Mount Lemmon	Mount Lemmon Survey	·	2.8 km	MPC · JPL
646211	2008 AZ_{143}	—	January 14, 2008	Kitt Peak	Spacewatch	EOS	2.1 km	MPC · JPL
646212	2008 AD_{144}	—	August 1, 2017	Haleakala	Pan-STARRS 1	EOS	1.5 km	MPC · JPL
646213	2008 AF_{144}	—	December 8, 2015	Catalina	CSS	·	1.1 km	MPC · JPL
646214	2008 AG_{144}	—	January 13, 2008	Mount Lemmon	Mount Lemmon Survey	·	2.2 km	MPC · JPL
646215	2008 AH_{144}	—	October 11, 2016	Mount Lemmon	Mount Lemmon Survey	·	560 m	MPC · JPL
646216	2008 AN_{144}	—	January 24, 2014	Haleakala	Pan-STARRS 1	·	2.5 km	MPC · JPL
646217	2008 AO_{144}	—	December 7, 2012	Haleakala	Pan-STARRS 1	·	2.2 km	MPC · JPL
646218	2008 AA_{145}	—	February 26, 2009	Kitt Peak	Spacewatch	3:2	4.4 km	MPC · JPL
646219	2008 AB_{145}	—	October 10, 2012	Haleakala	Pan-STARRS 1	LIX	2.7 km	MPC · JPL
646220	2008 AN_{145}	—	January 10, 2008	Kitt Peak	Spacewatch	·	2.5 km	MPC · JPL
646221	2008 AV_{145}	—	April 28, 2014	Haleakala	Pan-STARRS 1	H	420 m	MPC · JPL
646222	2008 AE_{146}	—	February 2, 2017	Haleakala	Pan-STARRS 1	·	1.2 km	MPC · JPL
646223	2008 AG_{146}	—	November 14, 2012	Kitt Peak	Spacewatch	·	1.9 km	MPC · JPL
646224	2008 AX_{146}	—	January 3, 2016	Haleakala	Pan-STARRS 1	3:2 · SHU	4.3 km	MPC · JPL
646225	2008 AE_{147}	—	July 14, 2016	Haleakala	Pan-STARRS 1	EOS	1.4 km	MPC · JPL
646226	2008 AQ_{147}	—	October 18, 2007	Catalina	CSS	·	2.7 km	MPC · JPL
646227	2008 AR_{148}	—	October 31, 2013	Kitt Peak	Spacewatch	·	560 m	MPC · JPL
646228	2008 AS_{148}	—	January 1, 2016	Haleakala	Pan-STARRS 1	H	400 m	MPC · JPL
646229	2008 AD_{149}	—	January 15, 2008	Mount Lemmon	Mount Lemmon Survey	·	780 m	MPC · JPL
646230	2008 AZ_{149}	—	January 14, 2008	Kitt Peak	Spacewatch	·	2.2 km	MPC · JPL
646231	2008 AK_{150}	—	January 10, 2008	Mount Lemmon	Mount Lemmon Survey	·	2.6 km	MPC · JPL
646232	2008 AM_{150}	—	January 10, 2008	Kitt Peak	Spacewatch	·	520 m	MPC · JPL
646233	2008 AQ_{150}	—	January 11, 2008	Kitt Peak	Spacewatch	TIR	2.1 km	MPC · JPL
646234	2008 AZ_{150}	—	January 1, 2008	Mount Lemmon	Mount Lemmon Survey	EOS	1.4 km	MPC · JPL
646235	2008 AB_{151}	—	January 11, 2008	Kitt Peak	Spacewatch	·	2.3 km	MPC · JPL
646236	2008 AF_{151}	—	January 14, 2008	Kitt Peak	Spacewatch	·	970 m	MPC · JPL
646237	2008 AG_{152}	—	January 11, 2008	Kitt Peak	Spacewatch	·	860 m	MPC · JPL
646238	2008 AM_{152}	—	January 12, 2008	Kitt Peak	Spacewatch	·	2.5 km	MPC · JPL
646239	2008 AX_{153}	—	January 11, 2008	Kitt Peak	Spacewatch	·	1.3 km	MPC · JPL
646240	2008 AY_{153}	—	January 11, 2008	Kitt Peak	Spacewatch	·	960 m	MPC · JPL
646241	2008 AA_{154}	—	January 11, 2008	Mount Lemmon	Mount Lemmon Survey	·	2.7 km	MPC · JPL
646242	2008 AC_{154}	—	January 15, 2008	Mount Lemmon	Mount Lemmon Survey	·	1.2 km	MPC · JPL
646243	2008 AP_{154}	—	January 1, 2008	Kitt Peak	Spacewatch	·	630 m	MPC · JPL
646244	2008 AQ_{154}	—	January 11, 2008	Kitt Peak	Spacewatch	·	2.4 km	MPC · JPL
646245	2008 AU_{154}	—	January 11, 2008	Mount Lemmon	Mount Lemmon Survey	·	2.3 km	MPC · JPL
646246	2008 AM_{155}	—	January 14, 2008	Kitt Peak	Spacewatch	·	2.2 km	MPC · JPL
646247	2008 AP_{157}	—	January 1, 2008	Mount Lemmon	Mount Lemmon Survey	EOS	1.6 km	MPC · JPL
646248	2008 AA_{158}	—	January 10, 2008	Mount Lemmon	Mount Lemmon Survey	KON	1.6 km	MPC · JPL
646249	2008 BH	—	January 16, 2008	Mount Lemmon	Mount Lemmon Survey	·	1.1 km	MPC · JPL
646250	2008 BY	—	December 5, 2007	Kitt Peak	Spacewatch	·	1.2 km	MPC · JPL
646251	2008 BJ_{1}	—	December 16, 2007	Mount Lemmon	Mount Lemmon Survey	·	1.2 km	MPC · JPL
646252	2008 BO_{1}	—	January 16, 2008	Mount Lemmon	Mount Lemmon Survey	·	2.1 km	MPC · JPL
646253	2008 BY_{1}	—	January 17, 2008	Mount Lemmon	Mount Lemmon Survey	·	1.9 km	MPC · JPL
646254	2008 BF_{2}	—	November 8, 2007	Catalina	CSS	·	1.2 km	MPC · JPL
646255	2008 BN_{5}	—	November 11, 2001	Apache Point	SDSS Collaboration	·	1.9 km	MPC · JPL
646256	2008 BA_{9}	—	January 16, 2008	Kitt Peak	Spacewatch	H	430 m	MPC · JPL
646257	2008 BK_{12}	—	January 18, 2008	Mount Lemmon	Mount Lemmon Survey	·	2.5 km	MPC · JPL
646258	2008 BM_{12}	—	September 19, 1998	Apache Point	SDSS Collaboration	·	960 m	MPC · JPL
646259	2008 BV_{13}	—	January 19, 2008	Kitt Peak	Spacewatch	·	2.5 km	MPC · JPL
646260	2008 BQ_{17}	—	January 30, 2008	Kitt Peak	Spacewatch	·	2.7 km	MPC · JPL
646261	2008 BS_{23}	—	January 12, 2008	Kitt Peak	Spacewatch	PHO	1.1 km	MPC · JPL
646262	2008 BV_{30}	—	August 29, 2005	Kitt Peak	Spacewatch	·	2.9 km	MPC · JPL
646263	2008 BU_{31}	—	January 30, 2008	Mount Lemmon	Mount Lemmon Survey	·	510 m	MPC · JPL
646264	2008 BW_{35}	—	January 30, 2008	Kitt Peak	Spacewatch	·	1.1 km	MPC · JPL
646265	2008 BJ_{37}	—	January 31, 2008	Mount Lemmon	Mount Lemmon Survey	MAR	760 m	MPC · JPL
646266	2008 BW_{37}	—	January 31, 2008	Mount Lemmon	Mount Lemmon Survey	·	1.3 km	MPC · JPL
646267	2008 BC_{47}	—	January 31, 2008	Mount Lemmon	Mount Lemmon Survey	·	2.3 km	MPC · JPL
646268	2008 BZ_{49}	—	January 16, 2008	Mount Lemmon	Mount Lemmon Survey	·	1.8 km	MPC · JPL
646269	2008 BY_{50}	—	January 30, 2008	Mount Lemmon	Mount Lemmon Survey	·	970 m	MPC · JPL
646270	2008 BE_{51}	—	March 29, 2009	Mount Lemmon	Mount Lemmon Survey	·	1.8 km	MPC · JPL
646271	2008 BG_{52}	—	January 19, 2008	Mount Lemmon	Mount Lemmon Survey	·	2.2 km	MPC · JPL
646272	2008 BT_{52}	—	January 31, 2008	Vail-Jarnac	Jarnac	·	2.5 km	MPC · JPL
646273	2008 BR_{54}	—	October 19, 2006	Kitt Peak	Deep Ecliptic Survey	·	900 m	MPC · JPL
646274	2008 BU_{54}	—	January 18, 2008	Mount Lemmon	Mount Lemmon Survey	·	1.3 km	MPC · JPL
646275	2008 BT_{55}	—	January 31, 2008	Mount Lemmon	Mount Lemmon Survey	·	1.4 km	MPC · JPL
646276	2008 BW_{55}	—	January 20, 2008	Kitt Peak	Spacewatch	·	2.3 km	MPC · JPL
646277	2008 BX_{55}	—	May 25, 2015	Haleakala	Pan-STARRS 1	·	3.0 km	MPC · JPL
646278	2008 BY_{55}	—	November 6, 2012	Mount Lemmon	Mount Lemmon Survey	EOS	1.5 km	MPC · JPL
646279	2008 BA_{56}	—	January 18, 2008	Mount Lemmon	Mount Lemmon Survey	·	2.2 km	MPC · JPL
646280	2008 BC_{56}	—	September 7, 2000	Kitt Peak	Spacewatch	·	2.5 km	MPC · JPL
646281	2008 BK_{56}	—	January 19, 2008	Mount Lemmon	Mount Lemmon Survey	H	390 m	MPC · JPL
646282	2008 BL_{56}	—	January 18, 2008	Mount Lemmon	Mount Lemmon Survey	RAF	900 m	MPC · JPL
646283	2008 BH_{57}	—	January 19, 2008	Kitt Peak	Spacewatch	·	2.5 km	MPC · JPL
646284	2008 BO_{57}	—	February 10, 2014	Haleakala	Pan-STARRS 1	·	2.5 km	MPC · JPL
646285	2008 BV_{57}	—	August 4, 2017	Haleakala	Pan-STARRS 1	EOS	1.4 km	MPC · JPL
646286	2008 BA_{58}	—	January 18, 2008	Mount Lemmon	Mount Lemmon Survey	·	2.3 km	MPC · JPL
646287	2008 BL_{58}	—	January 16, 2008	Kitt Peak	Spacewatch	·	2.5 km	MPC · JPL
646288	2008 BM_{58}	—	January 16, 2008	Kitt Peak	Spacewatch	·	2.5 km	MPC · JPL
646289	2008 BF_{59}	—	November 22, 2011	Mount Lemmon	Mount Lemmon Survey	·	1.2 km	MPC · JPL
646290	2008 BK_{59}	—	February 28, 2014	Haleakala	Pan-STARRS 1	·	1.9 km	MPC · JPL
646291	2008 BR_{59}	—	February 26, 2014	Haleakala	Pan-STARRS 1	·	2.5 km	MPC · JPL
646292	2008 BY_{59}	—	January 20, 2008	Kitt Peak	Spacewatch	·	2.7 km	MPC · JPL
646293	2008 BO_{60}	—	January 18, 2008	Kitt Peak	Spacewatch	·	540 m	MPC · JPL
646294	2008 BJ_{61}	—	January 18, 2008	Mount Lemmon	Mount Lemmon Survey	·	3.0 km	MPC · JPL
646295	2008 BY_{61}	—	September 27, 2000	Kitt Peak	Spacewatch	EOS	1.8 km	MPC · JPL
646296	2008 BA_{62}	—	January 20, 2008	Kitt Peak	Spacewatch	·	1.7 km	MPC · JPL
646297	2008 CL_{3}	—	December 30, 2007	Kitt Peak	Spacewatch	·	1.1 km	MPC · JPL
646298	2008 CK_{6}	—	February 1, 2008	Kitt Peak	Spacewatch	·	1.4 km	MPC · JPL
646299	2008 CX_{7}	—	December 30, 2007	Kitt Peak	Spacewatch	EOS	1.5 km	MPC · JPL
646300	2008 CC_{8}	—	December 30, 2007	Kitt Peak	Spacewatch	·	3.0 km	MPC · JPL

== 646301–646400 ==
back to top

Designation			Discovery			Properties		Ref
Permanent	Provisional	Named after	Date	Site	Discoverer(s)	Category	Diam.	Ref
646301	2008 CT_{12}	—	February 3, 2008	Kitt Peak	Spacewatch	·	2.4 km	MPC · JPL
646302	2008 CH_{13}	—	February 3, 2008	Mount Lemmon	Mount Lemmon Survey	·	640 m	MPC · JPL
646303	2008 CG_{17}	—	February 3, 2008	Kitt Peak	Spacewatch	·	1.0 km	MPC · JPL
646304	2008 CQ_{30}	—	February 2, 2008	Kitt Peak	Spacewatch	·	1.5 km	MPC · JPL
646305	2008 CY_{32}	—	February 2, 2008	Kitt Peak	Spacewatch	·	2.9 km	MPC · JPL
646306	2008 CV_{40}	—	February 2, 2008	Kitt Peak	Spacewatch	·	1.1 km	MPC · JPL
646307	2008 CL_{41}	—	February 2, 2008	Kitt Peak	Spacewatch	·	1.1 km	MPC · JPL
646308	2008 CO_{41}	—	February 2, 2008	Kitt Peak	Spacewatch	·	610 m	MPC · JPL
646309	2008 CD_{46}	—	February 2, 2008	Kitt Peak	Spacewatch	·	2.5 km	MPC · JPL
646310	2008 CP_{51}	—	February 7, 2008	Kitt Peak	Spacewatch	·	980 m	MPC · JPL
646311	2008 CE_{52}	—	December 5, 2007	Kitt Peak	Spacewatch	·	2.4 km	MPC · JPL
646312	2008 CP_{54}	—	February 7, 2008	Mount Lemmon	Mount Lemmon Survey	VER	2.2 km	MPC · JPL
646313	2008 CZ_{54}	—	January 11, 2008	Mount Lemmon	Mount Lemmon Survey	·	1.7 km	MPC · JPL
646314	2008 CD_{55}	—	February 7, 2008	Mount Lemmon	Mount Lemmon Survey	VER	2.3 km	MPC · JPL
646315	2008 CS_{58}	—	August 27, 2006	Kitt Peak	Spacewatch	·	940 m	MPC · JPL
646316	2008 CK_{60}	—	February 7, 2008	Mount Lemmon	Mount Lemmon Survey	·	2.5 km	MPC · JPL
646317	2008 CR_{60}	—	December 18, 2007	Mount Lemmon	Mount Lemmon Survey	·	2.7 km	MPC · JPL
646318	2008 CG_{61}	—	February 7, 2008	Mount Lemmon	Mount Lemmon Survey	(43176)	2.4 km	MPC · JPL
646319	2008 CG_{63}	—	February 8, 2008	Mount Lemmon	Mount Lemmon Survey	·	2.5 km	MPC · JPL
646320	2008 CU_{63}	—	August 29, 2005	Kitt Peak	Spacewatch	·	2.5 km	MPC · JPL
646321	2008 CZ_{63}	—	February 8, 2008	Mount Lemmon	Mount Lemmon Survey	·	2.1 km	MPC · JPL
646322	2008 CH_{64}	—	February 8, 2008	Mount Lemmon	Mount Lemmon Survey	·	3.1 km	MPC · JPL
646323	2008 CM_{64}	—	August 26, 2005	Palomar	NEAT	EOS	1.9 km	MPC · JPL
646324	2008 CB_{65}	—	February 8, 2008	Mount Lemmon	Mount Lemmon Survey	·	950 m	MPC · JPL
646325	2008 CS_{66}	—	February 8, 2008	Mount Lemmon	Mount Lemmon Survey	THM	1.9 km	MPC · JPL
646326	2008 CC_{67}	—	January 10, 2008	Kitt Peak	Spacewatch	·	950 m	MPC · JPL
646327	2008 CT_{67}	—	February 8, 2008	Mount Lemmon	Mount Lemmon Survey	·	540 m	MPC · JPL
646328	2008 CK_{69}	—	February 2, 2008	Bergisch Gladbach	W. Bickel	VER	2.2 km	MPC · JPL
646329	2008 CX_{69}	—	December 19, 2007	Mount Lemmon	Mount Lemmon Survey	·	570 m	MPC · JPL
646330	2008 CO_{72}	—	January 12, 2008	Lulin	LUSS	·	1.7 km	MPC · JPL
646331	2008 CT_{74}	—	February 7, 2008	Mount Lemmon	Mount Lemmon Survey	(895)	3.3 km	MPC · JPL
646332	2008 CU_{78}	—	December 17, 2007	Kitt Peak	Spacewatch	·	1.8 km	MPC · JPL
646333	2008 CT_{79}	—	February 7, 2008	Kitt Peak	Spacewatch	·	1.7 km	MPC · JPL
646334	2008 CT_{80}	—	February 7, 2008	Kitt Peak	Spacewatch	V	760 m	MPC · JPL
646335	2008 CB_{81}	—	February 7, 2008	Kitt Peak	Spacewatch	LIX	2.5 km	MPC · JPL
646336	2008 CL_{83}	—	February 7, 2008	Kitt Peak	Spacewatch	EUN	1.2 km	MPC · JPL
646337	2008 CY_{85}	—	February 7, 2008	Mount Lemmon	Mount Lemmon Survey	·	1.8 km	MPC · JPL
646338	2008 CP_{88}	—	September 15, 2006	Kitt Peak	Spacewatch	·	790 m	MPC · JPL
646339	2008 CW_{88}	—	February 7, 2008	Mount Lemmon	Mount Lemmon Survey	·	2.1 km	MPC · JPL
646340	2008 CC_{89}	—	February 7, 2008	Mount Lemmon	Mount Lemmon Survey	·	630 m	MPC · JPL
646341	2008 CF_{93}	—	October 2, 2006	Mount Lemmon	Mount Lemmon Survey	THM	1.9 km	MPC · JPL
646342	2008 CQ_{93}	—	February 2, 2008	Kitt Peak	Spacewatch	·	2.1 km	MPC · JPL
646343	2008 CB_{98}	—	February 2, 2008	Kitt Peak	Spacewatch	·	1.3 km	MPC · JPL
646344	2008 CF_{100}	—	February 9, 2008	Kitt Peak	Spacewatch	·	2.5 km	MPC · JPL
646345	2008 CM_{100}	—	February 9, 2008	Kitt Peak	Spacewatch	·	900 m	MPC · JPL
646346	2008 CH_{103}	—	February 2, 2008	Kitt Peak	Spacewatch	·	1.1 km	MPC · JPL
646347	2008 CL_{105}	—	February 9, 2008	Mount Lemmon	Mount Lemmon Survey	·	820 m	MPC · JPL
646348	2008 CY_{105}	—	February 9, 2008	Mount Lemmon	Mount Lemmon Survey	·	620 m	MPC · JPL
646349	2008 CG_{106}	—	December 5, 2007	Mount Lemmon	Mount Lemmon Survey	·	3.3 km	MPC · JPL
646350	2008 CJ_{106}	—	February 9, 2008	Mount Lemmon	Mount Lemmon Survey	·	2.9 km	MPC · JPL
646351	2008 CV_{106}	—	February 9, 2008	Mount Lemmon	Mount Lemmon Survey	·	2.4 km	MPC · JPL
646352	2008 CX_{107}	—	February 9, 2008	Kitt Peak	Spacewatch	EUN	830 m	MPC · JPL
646353	2008 CH_{109}	—	February 9, 2008	Kitt Peak	Spacewatch	(5)	900 m	MPC · JPL
646354	2008 CQ_{110}	—	February 10, 2008	Kitt Peak	Spacewatch	·	1.5 km	MPC · JPL
646355	2008 CX_{111}	—	February 10, 2008	Kitt Peak	Spacewatch	·	2.0 km	MPC · JPL
646356	2008 CN_{112}	—	October 19, 2006	Catalina	CSS	EOS	2.0 km	MPC · JPL
646357	2008 CQ_{112}	—	February 10, 2008	Kitt Peak	Spacewatch	·	2.1 km	MPC · JPL
646358	2008 CW_{113}	—	February 10, 2008	Kitt Peak	Spacewatch	·	2.6 km	MPC · JPL
646359	2008 CO_{114}	—	January 13, 2008	Mount Lemmon	Mount Lemmon Survey	·	890 m	MPC · JPL
646360	2008 CV_{114}	—	August 16, 2002	Palomar	NEAT	(5)	1.1 km	MPC · JPL
646361	2008 CC_{116}	—	January 12, 2008	Mount Lemmon	Mount Lemmon Survey	·	2.3 km	MPC · JPL
646362	2008 CE_{118}	—	December 31, 2007	Mount Lemmon	Mount Lemmon Survey	H	560 m	MPC · JPL
646363	2008 CO_{119}	—	January 10, 2008	Kitt Peak	Spacewatch	·	830 m	MPC · JPL
646364	2008 CA_{120}	—	January 30, 2008	Mount Lemmon	Mount Lemmon Survey	·	1.1 km	MPC · JPL
646365	2008 CZ_{122}	—	February 7, 2008	Mount Lemmon	Mount Lemmon Survey	·	2.0 km	MPC · JPL
646366	2008 CS_{123}	—	January 15, 2008	Mount Lemmon	Mount Lemmon Survey	·	1.6 km	MPC · JPL
646367	2008 CW_{123}	—	February 7, 2008	Mount Lemmon	Mount Lemmon Survey	·	1.9 km	MPC · JPL
646368	2008 CN_{124}	—	February 7, 2008	Mount Lemmon	Mount Lemmon Survey	VER	2.8 km	MPC · JPL
646369	2008 CY_{124}	—	July 11, 2016	Haleakala	Pan-STARRS 1	EOS	1.7 km	MPC · JPL
646370	2008 CF_{125}	—	December 16, 2007	Mount Lemmon	Mount Lemmon Survey	·	3.5 km	MPC · JPL
646371	2008 CX_{125}	—	December 31, 2007	Kitt Peak	Spacewatch	·	2.7 km	MPC · JPL
646372	2008 CN_{128}	—	February 8, 2008	Kitt Peak	Spacewatch	LIX	2.6 km	MPC · JPL
646373	2008 CS_{130}	—	January 1, 2008	Kitt Peak	Spacewatch	·	1.9 km	MPC · JPL
646374	2008 CZ_{138}	—	February 8, 2008	Kitt Peak	Spacewatch	·	2.2 km	MPC · JPL
646375	2008 CC_{139}	—	January 10, 2008	Mount Lemmon	Mount Lemmon Survey	·	500 m	MPC · JPL
646376	2008 CF_{140}	—	February 8, 2008	Kitt Peak	Spacewatch	MIS	2.4 km	MPC · JPL
646377	2008 CU_{140}	—	February 8, 2008	Mount Lemmon	Mount Lemmon Survey	·	1.2 km	MPC · JPL
646378	2008 CW_{141}	—	January 30, 2008	Mount Lemmon	Mount Lemmon Survey	HNS	990 m	MPC · JPL
646379	2008 CX_{145}	—	February 2, 2008	Kitt Peak	Spacewatch	·	1.5 km	MPC · JPL
646380	2008 CW_{147}	—	October 19, 2006	Kitt Peak	Spacewatch	·	640 m	MPC · JPL
646381	2008 CQ_{148}	—	August 29, 2006	Kitt Peak	Spacewatch	·	930 m	MPC · JPL
646382	2008 CL_{160}	—	February 9, 2008	Kitt Peak	Spacewatch	·	1.1 km	MPC · JPL
646383	2008 CA_{162}	—	January 10, 2008	Mount Lemmon	Mount Lemmon Survey	(5)	1.0 km	MPC · JPL
646384	2008 CS_{164}	—	February 10, 2008	Kitt Peak	Spacewatch	·	2.5 km	MPC · JPL
646385	2008 CT_{164}	—	February 10, 2008	Kitt Peak	Spacewatch	·	2.2 km	MPC · JPL
646386	2008 CF_{165}	—	February 10, 2008	Kitt Peak	Spacewatch	EMA	2.2 km	MPC · JPL
646387	2008 CU_{165}	—	February 10, 2008	Mount Lemmon	Mount Lemmon Survey	·	2.5 km	MPC · JPL
646388	2008 CJ_{167}	—	February 11, 2008	Mount Lemmon	Mount Lemmon Survey	·	1.1 km	MPC · JPL
646389	2008 CT_{171}	—	February 12, 2008	Kitt Peak	Spacewatch	·	2.9 km	MPC · JPL
646390	2008 CO_{172}	—	February 13, 2008	Kitt Peak	Spacewatch	·	900 m	MPC · JPL
646391	2008 CR_{174}	—	February 13, 2008	Mount Lemmon	Mount Lemmon Survey	·	940 m	MPC · JPL
646392	2008 CX_{179}	—	February 8, 2008	Catalina	CSS	·	3.0 km	MPC · JPL
646393	2008 CE_{183}	—	February 11, 2008	Mount Lemmon	Mount Lemmon Survey	·	1.1 km	MPC · JPL
646394	2008 CK_{184}	—	February 2, 2008	Mount Lemmon	Mount Lemmon Survey	EOS	1.5 km	MPC · JPL
646395	2008 CX_{189}	—	January 13, 2008	Catalina	CSS	H	520 m	MPC · JPL
646396	2008 CB_{193}	—	August 7, 2001	Haleakala	NEAT	EUN	1.3 km	MPC · JPL
646397	2008 CZ_{198}	—	February 2, 2008	Kitt Peak	Spacewatch	·	1.3 km	MPC · JPL
646398	2008 CG_{199}	—	February 13, 2008	Kitt Peak	Spacewatch	·	1.1 km	MPC · JPL
646399	2008 CR_{202}	—	August 31, 2005	Kitt Peak	Spacewatch	·	2.4 km	MPC · JPL
646400	2008 CQ_{203}	—	February 11, 2008	Mount Lemmon	Mount Lemmon Survey	BRG	1.1 km	MPC · JPL

== 646401–646500 ==
back to top

Designation			Discovery			Properties		Ref
Permanent	Provisional	Named after	Date	Site	Discoverer(s)	Category	Diam.	Ref
646401	2008 CN_{207}	—	February 13, 2008	Kitt Peak	Spacewatch	URS	3.1 km	MPC · JPL
646402	2008 CY_{207}	—	February 11, 2008	Mount Lemmon	Mount Lemmon Survey	(5)	790 m	MPC · JPL
646403	2008 CN_{212}	—	February 8, 2008	Kitt Peak	Spacewatch	HNS	1.0 km	MPC · JPL
646404	2008 CP_{217}	—	November 25, 2014	Haleakala	Pan-STARRS 1	·	1.2 km	MPC · JPL
646405	2008 CU_{217}	—	November 10, 2005	Kitt Peak	Spacewatch	3:2	5.7 km	MPC · JPL
646406	2008 CZ_{217}	—	February 8, 2008	Mount Lemmon	Mount Lemmon Survey	·	690 m	MPC · JPL
646407	2008 CA_{218}	—	February 11, 2008	Mount Lemmon	Mount Lemmon Survey	·	850 m	MPC · JPL
646408	2008 CN_{218}	—	February 9, 2008	Kitt Peak	Spacewatch	·	1.3 km	MPC · JPL
646409	2008 CW_{218}	—	February 10, 2008	Kitt Peak	Spacewatch	·	1.1 km	MPC · JPL
646410	2008 CZ_{218}	—	February 11, 2008	Mount Lemmon	Mount Lemmon Survey	(5)	1 km	MPC · JPL
646411	2008 CC_{219}	—	December 31, 2007	Kitt Peak	Spacewatch	·	580 m	MPC · JPL
646412	2008 CY_{219}	—	October 9, 1999	Socorro	LINEAR	MAS	720 m	MPC · JPL
646413	2008 CA_{220}	—	July 28, 2011	Haleakala	Pan-STARRS 1	(895)	2.7 km	MPC · JPL
646414	2008 CG_{220}	—	February 2, 2008	Kitt Peak	Spacewatch	·	2.6 km	MPC · JPL
646415	2008 CH_{220}	—	February 3, 2008	Kitt Peak	Spacewatch	·	2.8 km	MPC · JPL
646416	2008 CQ_{220}	—	February 26, 2014	Haleakala	Pan-STARRS 1	·	2.4 km	MPC · JPL
646417	2008 CS_{220}	—	June 8, 2011	Mount Lemmon	Mount Lemmon Survey	·	2.3 km	MPC · JPL
646418	2008 CT_{221}	—	February 10, 2008	Kitt Peak	Spacewatch	·	2.1 km	MPC · JPL
646419	2008 CX_{221}	—	February 12, 2008	Kitt Peak	Spacewatch	·	2.3 km	MPC · JPL
646420	2008 CA_{222}	—	October 31, 2014	Mount Lemmon	Mount Lemmon Survey	·	1.2 km	MPC · JPL
646421	2008 CC_{222}	—	February 13, 2008	Mount Lemmon	Mount Lemmon Survey	HNS	930 m	MPC · JPL
646422	2008 CE_{222}	—	August 30, 2005	Kitt Peak	Spacewatch	HYG	2.5 km	MPC · JPL
646423	2008 CK_{222}	—	September 8, 2011	Kitt Peak	Spacewatch	·	2.2 km	MPC · JPL
646424	2008 CO_{222}	—	January 9, 2013	Catalina	CSS	·	3.3 km	MPC · JPL
646425	2008 CR_{222}	—	February 10, 2008	Mount Lemmon	Mount Lemmon Survey	VER	2.0 km	MPC · JPL
646426	2008 CS_{222}	—	July 31, 2016	Haleakala	Pan-STARRS 1	·	2.4 km	MPC · JPL
646427	2008 CZ_{222}	—	February 1, 2012	Bergisch Gladbach	W. Bickel	·	840 m	MPC · JPL
646428	2008 CK_{223}	—	July 18, 2006	Siding Spring	SSS	·	3.0 km	MPC · JPL
646429	2008 CT_{223}	—	February 13, 2008	Kitt Peak	Spacewatch	·	2.6 km	MPC · JPL
646430	2008 CH_{224}	—	December 31, 2011	Mayhill-ISON	L. Elenin	·	1.4 km	MPC · JPL
646431	2008 CL_{224}	—	December 30, 2007	Kitt Peak	Spacewatch	·	1.3 km	MPC · JPL
646432	2008 CZ_{224}	—	September 19, 2017	Haleakala	Pan-STARRS 1	EOS	1.5 km	MPC · JPL
646433	2008 CC_{225}	—	February 7, 2008	Mount Lemmon	Mount Lemmon Survey	·	2.1 km	MPC · JPL
646434	2008 CE_{225}	—	December 23, 2012	Haleakala	Pan-STARRS 1	EOS	1.6 km	MPC · JPL
646435	2008 CM_{225}	—	March 28, 2009	Kitt Peak	Spacewatch	THM	2.2 km	MPC · JPL
646436	2008 CS_{225}	—	March 28, 2015	Haleakala	Pan-STARRS 1	·	3.1 km	MPC · JPL
646437	2008 CG_{226}	—	July 4, 2016	Haleakala	Pan-STARRS 1	EMA	2.5 km	MPC · JPL
646438	2008 CL_{227}	—	March 16, 2009	Kitt Peak	Spacewatch	·	2.4 km	MPC · JPL
646439	2008 CD_{228}	—	February 13, 2008	Kitt Peak	Spacewatch	·	540 m	MPC · JPL
646440	2008 CG_{228}	—	March 10, 2014	Mount Lemmon	Mount Lemmon Survey	·	2.7 km	MPC · JPL
646441	2008 CH_{228}	—	January 13, 2008	Kitt Peak	Spacewatch	·	1.2 km	MPC · JPL
646442	2008 CP_{228}	—	August 3, 2016	Haleakala	Pan-STARRS 1	VER	2.5 km	MPC · JPL
646443	2008 CV_{228}	—	September 30, 2017	Mount Lemmon	Mount Lemmon Survey	·	2.8 km	MPC · JPL
646444	2008 CM_{229}	—	February 10, 2008	Kitt Peak	Spacewatch	·	2.7 km	MPC · JPL
646445	2008 CO_{229}	—	October 11, 2017	Mount Lemmon	Mount Lemmon Survey	·	2.5 km	MPC · JPL
646446	2008 CW_{229}	—	September 11, 2010	Catalina	CSS	·	1.8 km	MPC · JPL
646447	2008 CB_{230}	—	February 13, 2008	Kitt Peak	Spacewatch	(5)	920 m	MPC · JPL
646448	2008 CG_{230}	—	December 23, 2012	Haleakala	Pan-STARRS 1	·	2.2 km	MPC · JPL
646449	2008 CJ_{230}	—	August 25, 2014	Haleakala	Pan-STARRS 1	·	1.2 km	MPC · JPL
646450	2008 CK_{230}	—	February 8, 2008	Mount Lemmon	Mount Lemmon Survey	·	1.9 km	MPC · JPL
646451	2008 CL_{230}	—	December 15, 2007	Kitt Peak	Spacewatch	·	1.7 km	MPC · JPL
646452	2008 CU_{230}	—	February 13, 2008	Mount Lemmon	Mount Lemmon Survey	·	2.1 km	MPC · JPL
646453	2008 CJ_{231}	—	February 2, 2008	Mount Lemmon	Mount Lemmon Survey	·	2.4 km	MPC · JPL
646454	2008 CT_{231}	—	February 26, 2014	Haleakala	Pan-STARRS 1	VER	2.0 km	MPC · JPL
646455	2008 CU_{231}	—	February 2, 2008	Mount Lemmon	Mount Lemmon Survey	·	2.4 km	MPC · JPL
646456	2008 CV_{231}	—	September 19, 2014	Haleakala	Pan-STARRS 1	MAR	770 m	MPC · JPL
646457	2008 CL_{232}	—	August 18, 2017	Haleakala	Pan-STARRS 1	TIR	2.3 km	MPC · JPL
646458	2008 CO_{232}	—	September 16, 2017	Haleakala	Pan-STARRS 1	·	2.1 km	MPC · JPL
646459	2008 CA_{233}	—	February 8, 2008	Mount Lemmon	Mount Lemmon Survey	·	2.3 km	MPC · JPL
646460	2008 CC_{233}	—	February 26, 2014	Haleakala	Pan-STARRS 1	EOS	1.5 km	MPC · JPL
646461	2008 CL_{233}	—	November 26, 2012	Mount Lemmon	Mount Lemmon Survey	·	1.8 km	MPC · JPL
646462	2008 CU_{233}	—	February 7, 2008	Kitt Peak	Spacewatch	·	2.6 km	MPC · JPL
646463	2008 CV_{233}	—	October 13, 2017	Mount Lemmon	Mount Lemmon Survey	·	2.2 km	MPC · JPL
646464	2008 CX_{233}	—	July 31, 2016	Haleakala	Pan-STARRS 1	·	1.7 km	MPC · JPL
646465	2008 CY_{233}	—	October 28, 2017	Haleakala	Pan-STARRS 1	·	2.3 km	MPC · JPL
646466	2008 CJ_{234}	—	July 9, 2016	Mount Lemmon	Mount Lemmon Survey	·	3.0 km	MPC · JPL
646467	2008 CM_{234}	—	October 22, 2017	Haleakala	Pan-STARRS 1	·	2.3 km	MPC · JPL
646468	2008 CW_{234}	—	December 13, 2012	Mount Lemmon	Mount Lemmon Survey	·	2.6 km	MPC · JPL
646469	2008 CC_{236}	—	January 19, 2012	Haleakala	Pan-STARRS 1	EUN	820 m	MPC · JPL
646470	2008 CE_{236}	—	November 27, 2013	Haleakala	Pan-STARRS 1	·	540 m	MPC · JPL
646471	2008 CJ_{236}	—	February 9, 2008	Kitt Peak	Spacewatch	·	2.3 km	MPC · JPL
646472	2008 CU_{236}	—	February 14, 2008	Mount Lemmon	Mount Lemmon Survey	·	790 m	MPC · JPL
646473	2008 CW_{236}	—	February 3, 2008	Kitt Peak	Spacewatch	EUN	1.0 km	MPC · JPL
646474	2008 CC_{237}	—	December 29, 2011	Kitt Peak	Spacewatch	·	780 m	MPC · JPL
646475	2008 CJ_{237}	—	February 9, 2008	Mount Lemmon	Mount Lemmon Survey	·	2.2 km	MPC · JPL
646476	2008 CK_{237}	—	February 11, 2008	Mount Lemmon	Mount Lemmon Survey	·	470 m	MPC · JPL
646477	2008 CN_{237}	—	February 12, 2008	Mount Lemmon	Mount Lemmon Survey	(159)	2.0 km	MPC · JPL
646478	2008 CW_{237}	—	February 2, 2008	Mount Lemmon	Mount Lemmon Survey	·	1.8 km	MPC · JPL
646479	2008 CH_{238}	—	February 9, 2008	Mount Lemmon	Mount Lemmon Survey	·	2.6 km	MPC · JPL
646480	2008 CK_{238}	—	February 9, 2008	Kitt Peak	Spacewatch	LIX	2.8 km	MPC · JPL
646481	2008 CA_{239}	—	February 9, 2008	Mount Lemmon	Mount Lemmon Survey	·	2.7 km	MPC · JPL
646482	2008 CM_{239}	—	February 3, 2008	Mount Lemmon	Mount Lemmon Survey	·	1.7 km	MPC · JPL
646483	2008 CS_{239}	—	February 10, 2008	Kitt Peak	Spacewatch	·	2.2 km	MPC · JPL
646484	2008 CD_{240}	—	February 9, 2008	Mount Lemmon	Mount Lemmon Survey	·	1.9 km	MPC · JPL
646485	2008 CP_{240}	—	February 7, 2008	Mount Lemmon	Mount Lemmon Survey	·	2.0 km	MPC · JPL
646486	2008 CR_{240}	—	February 2, 2008	Mount Lemmon	Mount Lemmon Survey	·	2.4 km	MPC · JPL
646487	2008 CS_{240}	—	February 2, 2008	Kitt Peak	Spacewatch	·	2.1 km	MPC · JPL
646488	2008 CV_{242}	—	February 6, 2008	Catalina	CSS	·	2.0 km	MPC · JPL
646489	2008 CQ_{243}	—	February 13, 2008	Kitt Peak	Spacewatch	·	1.0 km	MPC · JPL
646490	2008 CW_{245}	—	February 13, 2008	Kitt Peak	Spacewatch	·	2.0 km	MPC · JPL
646491	2008 CL_{246}	—	February 8, 2008	Mount Lemmon	Mount Lemmon Survey	·	2.2 km	MPC · JPL
646492	2008 CG_{247}	—	February 14, 2008	Mount Lemmon	Mount Lemmon Survey	·	2.4 km	MPC · JPL
646493	2008 CK_{247}	—	September 30, 2003	Kitt Peak	Spacewatch	·	440 m	MPC · JPL
646494	2008 CG_{249}	—	February 10, 2008	Kitt Peak	Spacewatch	(5)	760 m	MPC · JPL
646495	2008 CU_{249}	—	February 8, 2008	Mount Lemmon	Mount Lemmon Survey	EOS	1.5 km	MPC · JPL
646496	2008 DK_{2}	—	January 30, 2008	Kitt Peak	Spacewatch	·	790 m	MPC · JPL
646497	2008 DW_{2}	—	March 14, 2004	Catalina	CSS	·	1.1 km	MPC · JPL
646498	2008 DB_{6}	—	January 13, 2008	Kitt Peak	Spacewatch	·	1.5 km	MPC · JPL
646499	2008 DG_{9}	—	February 8, 2008	Mount Lemmon	Mount Lemmon Survey	·	570 m	MPC · JPL
646500	2008 DQ_{11}	—	December 31, 2007	Mount Lemmon	Mount Lemmon Survey	TIR	2.9 km	MPC · JPL

== 646501–646600 ==
back to top

Designation			Discovery			Properties		Ref
Permanent	Provisional	Named after	Date	Site	Discoverer(s)	Category	Diam.	Ref
646501	2008 DY_{12}	—	January 17, 2008	Kitt Peak	Spacewatch	·	2.6 km	MPC · JPL
646502	2008 DQ_{13}	—	February 12, 2008	Kitt Peak	Spacewatch	·	1.5 km	MPC · JPL
646503	2008 DT_{14}	—	February 26, 2008	Mount Lemmon	Mount Lemmon Survey	·	1.2 km	MPC · JPL
646504	2008 DU_{16}	—	February 27, 2008	Kitt Peak	Spacewatch	(5)	820 m	MPC · JPL
646505 Mihăileanu	2008 DF_{17}	Mihăileanu	February 28, 2008	Nogales	J.-C. Merlin	MAR	920 m	MPC · JPL
646506	2008 DM_{20}	—	February 28, 2008	Mount Lemmon	Mount Lemmon Survey	·	2.9 km	MPC · JPL
646507	2008 DT_{20}	—	January 19, 2008	Mount Lemmon	Mount Lemmon Survey	·	3.6 km	MPC · JPL
646508	2008 DU_{26}	—	February 28, 2008	Mount Lemmon	Mount Lemmon Survey	·	1.3 km	MPC · JPL
646509	2008 DQ_{27}	—	December 31, 2007	Kitt Peak	Spacewatch	·	570 m	MPC · JPL
646510	2008 DA_{28}	—	January 1, 2008	Kitt Peak	Spacewatch	·	2.9 km	MPC · JPL
646511	2008 DD_{28}	—	January 13, 2008	Kitt Peak	Spacewatch	·	2.3 km	MPC · JPL
646512	2008 DA_{29}	—	November 19, 2007	Mount Lemmon	Mount Lemmon Survey	·	2.5 km	MPC · JPL
646513	2008 DJ_{30}	—	February 26, 2008	Mount Lemmon	Mount Lemmon Survey	·	1.9 km	MPC · JPL
646514	2008 DE_{31}	—	January 11, 2008	Kitt Peak	Spacewatch	·	1.5 km	MPC · JPL
646515	2008 DC_{43}	—	February 28, 2008	Kitt Peak	Spacewatch	·	2.4 km	MPC · JPL
646516	2008 DA_{44}	—	February 28, 2008	Mount Lemmon	Mount Lemmon Survey	·	500 m	MPC · JPL
646517	2008 DC_{53}	—	February 29, 2008	Mount Lemmon	Mount Lemmon Survey	·	1.4 km	MPC · JPL
646518	2008 DS_{55}	—	February 2, 2008	Kitt Peak	Spacewatch	·	1.1 km	MPC · JPL
646519	2008 DV_{57}	—	December 17, 2007	Mount Lemmon	Mount Lemmon Survey	·	860 m	MPC · JPL
646520	2008 DR_{58}	—	November 19, 2007	Mount Lemmon	Mount Lemmon Survey	VER	2.3 km	MPC · JPL
646521	2008 DG_{59}	—	February 10, 2008	Kitt Peak	Spacewatch	·	1.2 km	MPC · JPL
646522	2008 DB_{61}	—	February 28, 2008	Mount Lemmon	Mount Lemmon Survey	·	1.1 km	MPC · JPL
646523	2008 DW_{62}	—	February 28, 2008	Mount Lemmon	Mount Lemmon Survey	·	2.2 km	MPC · JPL
646524	2008 DO_{63}	—	October 16, 2006	Catalina	CSS	LIX	3.5 km	MPC · JPL
646525	2008 DG_{64}	—	February 28, 2008	Mount Lemmon	Mount Lemmon Survey	·	2.2 km	MPC · JPL
646526	2008 DM_{64}	—	February 28, 2008	Mount Lemmon	Mount Lemmon Survey	EOS	1.7 km	MPC · JPL
646527	2008 DQ_{64}	—	February 2, 2008	Kitt Peak	Spacewatch	(883)	620 m	MPC · JPL
646528	2008 DA_{65}	—	December 14, 2006	Mount Lemmon	Mount Lemmon Survey	·	1.3 km	MPC · JPL
646529	2008 DE_{65}	—	February 28, 2008	Catalina	CSS	·	1.2 km	MPC · JPL
646530	2008 DM_{66}	—	January 10, 2008	Mount Lemmon	Mount Lemmon Survey	MAR	880 m	MPC · JPL
646531	2008 DH_{69}	—	February 12, 2008	Kitt Peak	Spacewatch	·	1.3 km	MPC · JPL
646532	2008 DL_{75}	—	February 28, 2008	Mount Lemmon	Mount Lemmon Survey	TIR	2.3 km	MPC · JPL
646533	2008 DV_{77}	—	February 13, 2008	Kitt Peak	Spacewatch	·	910 m	MPC · JPL
646534	2008 DD_{79}	—	February 29, 2008	Mount Lemmon	Mount Lemmon Survey	·	1.3 km	MPC · JPL
646535	2008 DN_{79}	—	February 29, 2008	Catalina	CSS	·	1.3 km	MPC · JPL
646536	2008 DJ_{84}	—	August 8, 2005	Cerro Tololo	Deep Ecliptic Survey	THM	1.6 km	MPC · JPL
646537	2008 DN_{90}	—	February 29, 2008	XuYi	PMO NEO Survey Program	·	2.8 km	MPC · JPL
646538	2008 DR_{90}	—	May 6, 2014	Mount Lemmon	Mount Lemmon Survey	·	2.7 km	MPC · JPL
646539	2008 DT_{90}	—	October 1, 2017	Haleakala	Pan-STARRS 1	·	2.2 km	MPC · JPL
646540	2008 DW_{90}	—	December 14, 2012	La Silla	A. Galád, K. Hornoch	·	2.0 km	MPC · JPL
646541	2008 DE_{91}	—	February 26, 2008	Mount Lemmon	Mount Lemmon Survey	·	2.5 km	MPC · JPL
646542	2008 DN_{91}	—	February 23, 2015	Haleakala	Pan-STARRS 1	·	540 m	MPC · JPL
646543	2008 DO_{91}	—	February 28, 2008	Kitt Peak	Spacewatch	·	610 m	MPC · JPL
646544	2008 DJ_{92}	—	February 26, 2008	Mount Lemmon	Mount Lemmon Survey	·	2.2 km	MPC · JPL
646545	2008 DK_{92}	—	February 26, 2008	Mount Lemmon	Mount Lemmon Survey	·	2.4 km	MPC · JPL
646546	2008 DG_{94}	—	January 4, 2011	Mount Lemmon	Mount Lemmon Survey	·	500 m	MPC · JPL
646547	2008 DK_{94}	—	March 12, 2014	Mount Lemmon	Mount Lemmon Survey	·	2.7 km	MPC · JPL
646548	2008 DO_{94}	—	October 20, 2016	Mount Lemmon	Mount Lemmon Survey	·	520 m	MPC · JPL
646549	2008 DG_{95}	—	March 7, 1997	Kitt Peak	Spacewatch	·	2.7 km	MPC · JPL
646550	2008 DQ_{95}	—	February 29, 2008	Kitt Peak	Spacewatch	H	320 m	MPC · JPL
646551	2008 DR_{95}	—	December 14, 2015	Haleakala	Pan-STARRS 1	·	1.1 km	MPC · JPL
646552	2008 DT_{95}	—	February 27, 2014	Haleakala	Pan-STARRS 1	·	2.3 km	MPC · JPL
646553	2008 DU_{95}	—	August 27, 2016	Haleakala	Pan-STARRS 1	·	2.7 km	MPC · JPL
646554	2008 DJ_{96}	—	February 29, 2008	Kitt Peak	Spacewatch	·	1.1 km	MPC · JPL
646555	2008 DC_{98}	—	February 28, 2008	Kitt Peak	Spacewatch	·	1.3 km	MPC · JPL
646556	2008 DA_{99}	—	February 28, 2008	Mount Lemmon	Mount Lemmon Survey	·	2.3 km	MPC · JPL
646557	2008 ET	—	March 1, 2008	Catalina	CSS	·	1.7 km	MPC · JPL
646558	2008 EB_{1}	—	February 13, 2008	Anderson Mesa	LONEOS	·	1.4 km	MPC · JPL
646559	2008 EL_{2}	—	December 19, 2007	Mount Lemmon	Mount Lemmon Survey	·	2.4 km	MPC · JPL
646560	2008 EW_{4}	—	March 2, 2008	Mount Lemmon	Mount Lemmon Survey	·	2.3 km	MPC · JPL
646561	2008 EX_{7}	—	March 3, 2008	XuYi	PMO NEO Survey Program	·	1.1 km	MPC · JPL
646562	2008 EN_{12}	—	March 1, 2008	Kitt Peak	Spacewatch	·	1.0 km	MPC · JPL
646563	2008 EM_{18}	—	March 1, 2008	Mount Lemmon	Mount Lemmon Survey	·	2.3 km	MPC · JPL
646564	2008 ET_{18}	—	March 1, 2008	Mount Lemmon	Mount Lemmon Survey	·	2.6 km	MPC · JPL
646565	2008 EN_{20}	—	February 9, 2008	Mount Lemmon	Mount Lemmon Survey	HYG	2.0 km	MPC · JPL
646566	2008 EB_{28}	—	March 4, 2008	Mount Lemmon	Mount Lemmon Survey	·	2.2 km	MPC · JPL
646567	2008 EF_{28}	—	December 1, 2000	Kitt Peak	Spacewatch	·	3.1 km	MPC · JPL
646568	2008 ED_{31}	—	March 5, 2008	Mount Lemmon	Mount Lemmon Survey	VER	2.2 km	MPC · JPL
646569	2008 EK_{31}	—	March 5, 2008	Mount Lemmon	Mount Lemmon Survey	EOS	1.6 km	MPC · JPL
646570	2008 EV_{31}	—	March 5, 2008	Mount Lemmon	Mount Lemmon Survey	·	1.0 km	MPC · JPL
646571	2008 EZ_{32}	—	March 1, 2008	Kitt Peak	Spacewatch	·	480 m	MPC · JPL
646572	2008 EV_{43}	—	February 12, 2008	Kitt Peak	Spacewatch	·	2.4 km	MPC · JPL
646573	2008 EW_{44}	—	March 5, 2008	Kitt Peak	Spacewatch	EUP	2.7 km	MPC · JPL
646574	2008 EJ_{46}	—	March 5, 2008	Mount Lemmon	Mount Lemmon Survey	HYG	1.8 km	MPC · JPL
646575	2008 EQ_{46}	—	March 5, 2008	Mount Lemmon	Mount Lemmon Survey	·	1.3 km	MPC · JPL
646576	2008 ES_{46}	—	March 5, 2008	Mount Lemmon	Mount Lemmon Survey	·	2.2 km	MPC · JPL
646577	2008 EA_{49}	—	February 13, 2008	Kitt Peak	Spacewatch	·	1.6 km	MPC · JPL
646578	2008 EQ_{50}	—	March 6, 2008	Mount Lemmon	Mount Lemmon Survey	·	2.6 km	MPC · JPL
646579	2008 EJ_{51}	—	March 6, 2008	Kitt Peak	Spacewatch	·	2.2 km	MPC · JPL
646580	2008 ET_{51}	—	March 6, 2008	Mount Lemmon	Mount Lemmon Survey	EOS	1.8 km	MPC · JPL
646581	2008 EG_{52}	—	March 6, 2008	Mount Lemmon	Mount Lemmon Survey	MAR	810 m	MPC · JPL
646582	2008 EH_{53}	—	March 31, 2003	Kitt Peak	Spacewatch	·	2.6 km	MPC · JPL
646583	2008 EF_{54}	—	March 15, 2004	Kitt Peak	Spacewatch	·	1.1 km	MPC · JPL
646584	2008 EJ_{58}	—	February 8, 2008	Mount Lemmon	Mount Lemmon Survey	·	1.1 km	MPC · JPL
646585	2008 EY_{58}	—	March 8, 2008	Mount Lemmon	Mount Lemmon Survey	VER	2.5 km	MPC · JPL
646586	2008 EN_{60}	—	March 8, 2008	Mount Lemmon	Mount Lemmon Survey	·	1.4 km	MPC · JPL
646587	2008 ES_{61}	—	February 12, 2008	Mount Lemmon	Mount Lemmon Survey	·	2.3 km	MPC · JPL
646588	2008 EB_{62}	—	March 9, 2008	Mount Lemmon	Mount Lemmon Survey	KON	2.1 km	MPC · JPL
646589	2008 EK_{64}	—	March 1, 2008	Kitt Peak	Spacewatch	(5)	850 m	MPC · JPL
646590	2008 EP_{64}	—	March 9, 2008	Mount Lemmon	Mount Lemmon Survey	·	2.4 km	MPC · JPL
646591	2008 ED_{65}	—	March 9, 2008	Mount Lemmon	Mount Lemmon Survey	·	2.0 km	MPC · JPL
646592	2008 ET_{65}	—	March 9, 2008	Mount Lemmon	Mount Lemmon Survey	·	2.4 km	MPC · JPL
646593	2008 EM_{74}	—	March 7, 2008	Kitt Peak	Spacewatch	·	2.4 km	MPC · JPL
646594	2008 EG_{76}	—	March 7, 2008	Mount Lemmon	Mount Lemmon Survey	·	2.9 km	MPC · JPL
646595	2008 EP_{78}	—	March 8, 2008	Kitt Peak	Spacewatch	·	2.1 km	MPC · JPL
646596	2008 EF_{79}	—	February 10, 2008	Kitt Peak	Spacewatch	·	2.1 km	MPC · JPL
646597	2008 EJ_{84}	—	March 12, 2008	Junk Bond	D. Healy	·	880 m	MPC · JPL
646598	2008 EP_{84}	—	March 5, 2008	Mount Lemmon	Mount Lemmon Survey	·	2.1 km	MPC · JPL
646599	2008 EZ_{85}	—	February 18, 2008	Mount Lemmon	Mount Lemmon Survey	·	2.4 km	MPC · JPL
646600	2008 EX_{89}	—	March 14, 2008	Catalina	CSS	·	560 m	MPC · JPL

== 646601–646700 ==
back to top

Designation			Discovery			Properties		Ref
Permanent	Provisional	Named after	Date	Site	Discoverer(s)	Category	Diam.	Ref
646601	2008 EG_{90}	—	March 9, 2008	Pla D'Arguines	R. Ferrando, Ferrando, M.	ADE	1.8 km	MPC · JPL
646602	2008 EZ_{92}	—	March 6, 2008	Catalina	CSS	·	1.7 km	MPC · JPL
646603	2008 EL_{95}	—	February 12, 2008	Mount Lemmon	Mount Lemmon Survey	·	3.4 km	MPC · JPL
646604	2008 EW_{97}	—	March 11, 2008	Mount Lemmon	Mount Lemmon Survey	·	560 m	MPC · JPL
646605	2008 ED_{101}	—	February 10, 2008	Mount Lemmon	Mount Lemmon Survey	·	1.2 km	MPC · JPL
646606	2008 EC_{102}	—	March 5, 2008	Mount Lemmon	Mount Lemmon Survey	·	2.5 km	MPC · JPL
646607	2008 EP_{102}	—	March 5, 2008	Mount Lemmon	Mount Lemmon Survey	·	2.2 km	MPC · JPL
646608	2008 EH_{103}	—	February 10, 2008	Mount Lemmon	Mount Lemmon Survey	·	1.9 km	MPC · JPL
646609	2008 ER_{108}	—	January 10, 2008	Mount Lemmon	Mount Lemmon Survey	·	2.0 km	MPC · JPL
646610	2008 ER_{109}	—	February 2, 2008	Kitt Peak	Spacewatch	·	880 m	MPC · JPL
646611	2008 EE_{111}	—	March 8, 2008	Kitt Peak	Spacewatch	HNS	850 m	MPC · JPL
646612	2008 EU_{112}	—	March 8, 2008	Kitt Peak	Spacewatch	KON	2.1 km	MPC · JPL
646613	2008 ES_{116}	—	October 20, 2006	Mount Lemmon	Mount Lemmon Survey	·	1.2 km	MPC · JPL
646614	2008 EW_{116}	—	March 8, 2008	Kitt Peak	Spacewatch	·	1.1 km	MPC · JPL
646615	2008 EN_{124}	—	February 13, 2008	Kitt Peak	Spacewatch	·	560 m	MPC · JPL
646616	2008 EW_{124}	—	March 10, 2008	Mount Lemmon	Mount Lemmon Survey	·	2.3 km	MPC · JPL
646617	2008 EL_{126}	—	March 10, 2008	Kitt Peak	Spacewatch	·	1.2 km	MPC · JPL
646618	2008 EK_{128}	—	March 11, 2008	Kitt Peak	Spacewatch	·	1.3 km	MPC · JPL
646619	2008 ER_{129}	—	March 11, 2008	Kitt Peak	Spacewatch	·	1.0 km	MPC · JPL
646620	2008 ES_{136}	—	March 11, 2008	Kitt Peak	Spacewatch	·	560 m	MPC · JPL
646621	2008 EQ_{138}	—	March 11, 2008	Mount Lemmon	Mount Lemmon Survey	·	2.0 km	MPC · JPL
646622	2008 EY_{141}	—	December 13, 2006	Mount Lemmon	Mount Lemmon Survey	EOS	1.6 km	MPC · JPL
646623	2008 ET_{142}	—	February 29, 2008	Kitt Peak	Spacewatch	·	560 m	MPC · JPL
646624	2008 EA_{145}	—	March 27, 2008	Mount Lemmon	Mount Lemmon Survey	·	3.3 km	MPC · JPL
646625	2008 EX_{152}	—	March 28, 2008	Kitt Peak	Spacewatch	EUN	1.4 km	MPC · JPL
646626 Valentingrigore	2008 EB_{155}	Valentingrigore	March 11, 2008	La Silla	EURONEAR	·	1.9 km	MPC · JPL
646627	2008 ER_{160}	—	March 1, 2008	Kitt Peak	Spacewatch	·	2.0 km	MPC · JPL
646628	2008 EN_{164}	—	March 13, 2008	Kitt Peak	Spacewatch	MAR	800 m	MPC · JPL
646629	2008 EV_{167}	—	March 10, 2008	Kitt Peak	Spacewatch	·	860 m	MPC · JPL
646630	2008 EM_{168}	—	March 12, 2008	Kitt Peak	Spacewatch	·	1.8 km	MPC · JPL
646631	2008 EN_{171}	—	March 11, 2008	Mount Lemmon	Mount Lemmon Survey	·	1.8 km	MPC · JPL
646632	2008 EA_{172}	—	March 11, 2008	Kitt Peak	Spacewatch	·	1.7 km	MPC · JPL
646633	2008 EC_{172}	—	March 13, 2008	Kitt Peak	Spacewatch	·	590 m	MPC · JPL
646634	2008 EE_{173}	—	March 2, 2008	Kitt Peak	Spacewatch	·	2.5 km	MPC · JPL
646635	2008 EF_{173}	—	September 29, 2011	Mount Lemmon	Mount Lemmon Survey	HYG	2.4 km	MPC · JPL
646636	2008 EK_{173}	—	September 4, 2011	Haleakala	Pan-STARRS 1	·	2.7 km	MPC · JPL
646637	2008 EL_{173}	—	December 8, 2012	Nogales	M. Schwartz, P. R. Holvorcem	·	2.6 km	MPC · JPL
646638	2008 EN_{173}	—	March 10, 2008	Kitt Peak	Spacewatch	·	600 m	MPC · JPL
646639	2008 EX_{173}	—	March 8, 2008	Mount Lemmon	Mount Lemmon Survey	·	2.5 km	MPC · JPL
646640	2008 EY_{173}	—	July 20, 2009	Siding Spring	SSS	·	1.9 km	MPC · JPL
646641	2008 EA_{174}	—	August 29, 2009	Catalina	CSS	·	1.6 km	MPC · JPL
646642	2008 EF_{174}	—	April 23, 2014	Mount Lemmon	Mount Lemmon Survey	·	2.3 km	MPC · JPL
646643	2008 EL_{174}	—	January 16, 2013	Mount Lemmon	Mount Lemmon Survey	LIX	3.3 km	MPC · JPL
646644	2008 EO_{174}	—	March 10, 2008	Kitt Peak	Spacewatch	·	2.4 km	MPC · JPL
646645	2008 ES_{174}	—	February 9, 2008	Kitt Peak	Spacewatch	·	2.6 km	MPC · JPL
646646	2008 EU_{174}	—	February 13, 2013	Haleakala	Pan-STARRS 1	·	2.2 km	MPC · JPL
646647	2008 EV_{174}	—	March 2, 2008	Mount Lemmon	Mount Lemmon Survey	·	2.5 km	MPC · JPL
646648	2008 EZ_{174}	—	July 31, 2000	Cerro Tololo	Deep Ecliptic Survey	·	2.4 km	MPC · JPL
646649	2008 EC_{175}	—	April 21, 2013	Haleakala	Pan-STARRS 1	·	1.4 km	MPC · JPL
646650	2008 EE_{175}	—	March 6, 2008	Mount Lemmon	Mount Lemmon Survey	·	680 m	MPC · JPL
646651	2008 EJ_{175}	—	November 25, 1998	Anderson Mesa	LONEOS	·	1.4 km	MPC · JPL
646652	2008 ES_{175}	—	August 15, 2009	Kitt Peak	Spacewatch	·	590 m	MPC · JPL
646653	2008 EX_{175}	—	May 12, 2013	Haleakala	Pan-STARRS 1	·	1.2 km	MPC · JPL
646654	2008 EE_{176}	—	March 28, 2014	Mount Lemmon	Mount Lemmon Survey	·	2.6 km	MPC · JPL
646655	2008 EL_{176}	—	June 20, 2013	Haleakala	Pan-STARRS 1	·	900 m	MPC · JPL
646656	2008 ER_{176}	—	March 15, 2008	Mount Lemmon	Mount Lemmon Survey	·	2.6 km	MPC · JPL
646657	2008 EY_{176}	—	July 7, 2016	Mount Lemmon	Mount Lemmon Survey	·	2.8 km	MPC · JPL
646658	2008 EB_{177}	—	September 4, 2011	Haleakala	Pan-STARRS 1	·	2.2 km	MPC · JPL
646659	2008 EF_{177}	—	April 7, 2014	Mount Lemmon	Mount Lemmon Survey	·	2.6 km	MPC · JPL
646660	2008 EJ_{177}	—	August 15, 2009	Kitt Peak	Spacewatch	H	420 m	MPC · JPL
646661	2008 ET_{177}	—	March 13, 2008	Mount Lemmon	Mount Lemmon Survey	PHO	830 m	MPC · JPL
646662	2008 EU_{177}	—	December 22, 2012	Haleakala	Pan-STARRS 1	·	2.3 km	MPC · JPL
646663	2008 EW_{177}	—	March 11, 2008	Kitt Peak	Spacewatch	·	610 m	MPC · JPL
646664	2008 EA_{178}	—	February 8, 2013	Haleakala	Pan-STARRS 1	·	1.7 km	MPC · JPL
646665	2008 EB_{178}	—	March 6, 2008	Mount Lemmon	Mount Lemmon Survey	·	1.9 km	MPC · JPL
646666	2008 EC_{178}	—	August 27, 2011	Haleakala	Pan-STARRS 1	·	2.4 km	MPC · JPL
646667	2008 EH_{178}	—	April 4, 2014	Mount Lemmon	Mount Lemmon Survey	·	2.2 km	MPC · JPL
646668	2008 EJ_{178}	—	April 4, 2014	Haleakala	Pan-STARRS 1	LIX	2.4 km	MPC · JPL
646669	2008 EM_{178}	—	April 1, 2014	Mount Lemmon	Mount Lemmon Survey	·	2.4 km	MPC · JPL
646670	2008 EN_{178}	—	March 8, 2008	Mount Lemmon	Mount Lemmon Survey	MAR	900 m	MPC · JPL
646671	2008 EO_{178}	—	March 25, 2015	Haleakala	Pan-STARRS 1	·	710 m	MPC · JPL
646672	2008 EK_{179}	—	March 13, 2008	Mount Lemmon	Mount Lemmon Survey	EUN	890 m	MPC · JPL
646673	2008 ER_{179}	—	March 5, 2014	Haleakala	Pan-STARRS 1	·	3.4 km	MPC · JPL
646674	2008 EU_{180}	—	August 29, 2014	Mount Lemmon	Mount Lemmon Survey	·	1.7 km	MPC · JPL
646675	2008 EJ_{181}	—	March 10, 2008	Mount Lemmon	Mount Lemmon Survey	·	2.7 km	MPC · JPL
646676	2008 EM_{181}	—	March 13, 2008	Kitt Peak	Spacewatch	·	1.5 km	MPC · JPL
646677	2008 EP_{181}	—	March 3, 2008	XuYi	PMO NEO Survey Program	·	1.5 km	MPC · JPL
646678	2008 ER_{181}	—	August 1, 2017	Haleakala	Pan-STARRS 1	·	2.1 km	MPC · JPL
646679	2008 ES_{181}	—	August 1, 2016	Haleakala	Pan-STARRS 1	VER	2.4 km	MPC · JPL
646680	2008 EP_{182}	—	September 26, 2017	Haleakala	Pan-STARRS 1	·	2.2 km	MPC · JPL
646681	2008 ER_{182}	—	September 18, 2009	Mount Lemmon	Mount Lemmon Survey	·	600 m	MPC · JPL
646682	2008 ES_{182}	—	August 8, 2016	Haleakala	Pan-STARRS 1	·	2.6 km	MPC · JPL
646683	2008 EX_{182}	—	November 12, 2017	Mount Lemmon	Mount Lemmon Survey	·	2.4 km	MPC · JPL
646684 Boaca	2008 EY_{182}	Boaca	June 24, 2014	La Palma	EURONEAR	H	450 m	MPC · JPL
646685	2008 EA_{183}	—	August 6, 2012	Haleakala	Pan-STARRS 1	·	530 m	MPC · JPL
646686	2008 EB_{183}	—	April 21, 2014	Mount Lemmon	Mount Lemmon Survey	·	2.6 km	MPC · JPL
646687	2008 EC_{183}	—	October 21, 2014	Kitt Peak	Spacewatch	·	1.6 km	MPC · JPL
646688	2008 ED_{183}	—	February 26, 2014	Mount Lemmon	Mount Lemmon Survey	·	2.2 km	MPC · JPL
646689	2008 EF_{183}	—	March 21, 2015	Haleakala	Pan-STARRS 1	·	560 m	MPC · JPL
646690	2008 EH_{183}	—	December 12, 2012	Mount Lemmon	Mount Lemmon Survey	·	2.9 km	MPC · JPL
646691	2008 ER_{183}	—	October 25, 2011	Haleakala	Pan-STARRS 1	EOS	1.5 km	MPC · JPL
646692	2008 EY_{183}	—	March 2, 2008	Mount Lemmon	Mount Lemmon Survey	·	2.5 km	MPC · JPL
646693	2008 EC_{184}	—	March 4, 2008	Kitt Peak	Spacewatch	HNS	860 m	MPC · JPL
646694	2008 EN_{184}	—	December 3, 2012	Mount Lemmon	Mount Lemmon Survey	·	2.2 km	MPC · JPL
646695	2008 EO_{184}	—	October 28, 2017	Mount Lemmon	Mount Lemmon Survey	·	2.3 km	MPC · JPL
646696	2008 EP_{184}	—	March 10, 2008	Kitt Peak	Spacewatch	·	2.1 km	MPC · JPL
646697	2008 EQ_{184}	—	March 15, 2008	Kitt Peak	Spacewatch	TIR	2.3 km	MPC · JPL
646698	2008 EV_{184}	—	March 15, 2008	Kitt Peak	Spacewatch	·	2.2 km	MPC · JPL
646699	2008 EW_{184}	—	March 11, 2008	Kitt Peak	Spacewatch	H	460 m	MPC · JPL
646700	2008 EA_{185}	—	August 28, 2016	Mount Lemmon	Mount Lemmon Survey	EOS	1.8 km	MPC · JPL

== 646701–646800 ==
back to top

Designation			Discovery			Properties		Ref
Permanent	Provisional	Named after	Date	Site	Discoverer(s)	Category	Diam.	Ref
646701	2008 EJ_{185}	—	April 5, 2014	Haleakala	Pan-STARRS 1	TIR	2.3 km	MPC · JPL
646702	2008 EB_{186}	—	February 5, 2013	Mount Lemmon	Mount Lemmon Survey	·	1.8 km	MPC · JPL
646703	2008 EE_{186}	—	January 10, 2013	Haleakala	Pan-STARRS 1	·	2.8 km	MPC · JPL
646704	2008 EH_{186}	—	September 26, 2017	Haleakala	Pan-STARRS 1	·	2.4 km	MPC · JPL
646705	2008 EK_{186}	—	March 13, 2008	Kitt Peak	Spacewatch	·	540 m	MPC · JPL
646706	2008 EY_{186}	—	March 1, 2008	Kitt Peak	Spacewatch	·	2.7 km	MPC · JPL
646707	2008 EN_{187}	—	May 22, 2015	Haleakala	Pan-STARRS 1	·	2.2 km	MPC · JPL
646708	2008 EP_{187}	—	August 9, 2005	Cerro Tololo	Deep Ecliptic Survey	·	2.3 km	MPC · JPL
646709	2008 EF_{188}	—	April 5, 2014	Haleakala	Pan-STARRS 1	·	2.5 km	MPC · JPL
646710	2008 EN_{188}	—	October 12, 2017	Mount Lemmon	Mount Lemmon Survey	·	2.1 km	MPC · JPL
646711	2008 EJ_{189}	—	March 6, 2008	Mount Lemmon	Mount Lemmon Survey	·	1.1 km	MPC · JPL
646712	2008 EV_{189}	—	March 11, 2008	Mount Lemmon	Mount Lemmon Survey	·	890 m	MPC · JPL
646713	2008 EF_{190}	—	March 10, 2008	Kitt Peak	Spacewatch	·	2.3 km	MPC · JPL
646714	2008 EF_{191}	—	March 14, 2004	Kitt Peak	Spacewatch	·	1.4 km	MPC · JPL
646715	2008 EG_{191}	—	March 8, 2008	Mount Lemmon	Mount Lemmon Survey	·	2.5 km	MPC · JPL
646716	2008 EV_{193}	—	March 5, 2008	Mount Lemmon	Mount Lemmon Survey	·	2.3 km	MPC · JPL
646717	2008 EW_{193}	—	March 6, 2008	Mount Lemmon	Mount Lemmon Survey	·	510 m	MPC · JPL
646718	2008 EL_{194}	—	March 12, 2008	Mount Lemmon	Mount Lemmon Survey	·	1.4 km	MPC · JPL
646719	2008 EP_{194}	—	March 13, 2008	Kitt Peak	Spacewatch	·	2.4 km	MPC · JPL
646720	2008 EL_{195}	—	March 11, 2008	Kitt Peak	Spacewatch	VER	2.2 km	MPC · JPL
646721	2008 EF_{196}	—	March 5, 2008	Mount Lemmon	Mount Lemmon Survey	·	1.9 km	MPC · JPL
646722	2008 EK_{198}	—	March 12, 2008	Mount Lemmon	Mount Lemmon Survey	VER	2.2 km	MPC · JPL
646723	2008 FC_{5}	—	March 13, 2008	Kitt Peak	Spacewatch	·	2.4 km	MPC · JPL
646724	2008 FA_{6}	—	March 27, 2008	Vail	Observatory, Jarnac	·	3.4 km	MPC · JPL
646725	2008 FN_{9}	—	February 26, 2008	Mount Lemmon	Mount Lemmon Survey	·	560 m	MPC · JPL
646726	2008 FT_{9}	—	March 10, 2008	Catalina	CSS	H	520 m	MPC · JPL
646727	2008 FR_{13}	—	February 10, 2008	Mount Lemmon	Mount Lemmon Survey	·	1.4 km	MPC · JPL
646728	2008 FY_{16}	—	March 27, 2008	Kitt Peak	Spacewatch	·	3.0 km	MPC · JPL
646729	2008 FY_{22}	—	March 27, 2008	Kitt Peak	Spacewatch	·	1.3 km	MPC · JPL
646730	2008 FO_{24}	—	March 27, 2008	Kitt Peak	Spacewatch	·	1.4 km	MPC · JPL
646731	2008 FD_{27}	—	October 5, 2005	Mount Lemmon	Mount Lemmon Survey	ADE	2.0 km	MPC · JPL
646732	2008 FB_{29}	—	February 27, 2008	Mount Lemmon	Mount Lemmon Survey	H	450 m	MPC · JPL
646733	2008 FD_{29}	—	February 3, 2008	Kitt Peak	Spacewatch	·	2.8 km	MPC · JPL
646734	2008 FY_{29}	—	February 3, 2008	Kitt Peak	Spacewatch	EOS	1.9 km	MPC · JPL
646735	2008 FB_{34}	—	March 8, 2008	Mount Lemmon	Mount Lemmon Survey	·	600 m	MPC · JPL
646736	2008 FX_{34}	—	March 19, 2004	Kitt Peak	Spacewatch	(5)	880 m	MPC · JPL
646737	2008 FO_{35}	—	March 28, 2008	Mount Lemmon	Mount Lemmon Survey	·	840 m	MPC · JPL
646738	2008 FK_{39}	—	March 28, 2008	Kitt Peak	Spacewatch	·	1.1 km	MPC · JPL
646739	2008 FY_{39}	—	November 18, 2003	Kitt Peak	Spacewatch	·	530 m	MPC · JPL
646740	2008 FN_{40}	—	February 13, 2008	Mount Lemmon	Mount Lemmon Survey	·	1.7 km	MPC · JPL
646741	2008 FK_{44}	—	March 8, 2008	Mount Lemmon	Mount Lemmon Survey	·	2.0 km	MPC · JPL
646742	2008 FK_{47}	—	March 5, 2008	Kitt Peak	Spacewatch	·	560 m	MPC · JPL
646743	2008 FP_{47}	—	March 28, 2008	Mount Lemmon	Mount Lemmon Survey	·	430 m	MPC · JPL
646744	2008 FX_{48}	—	March 28, 2008	Mount Lemmon	Mount Lemmon Survey	·	1.0 km	MPC · JPL
646745	2008 FD_{49}	—	March 28, 2008	Mount Lemmon	Mount Lemmon Survey	HNS	930 m	MPC · JPL
646746	2008 FJ_{50}	—	March 12, 2008	Mount Lemmon	Mount Lemmon Survey	·	1.2 km	MPC · JPL
646747	2008 FM_{50}	—	March 11, 2008	Kitt Peak	Spacewatch	·	530 m	MPC · JPL
646748	2008 FU_{50}	—	March 28, 2008	Kitt Peak	Spacewatch	·	1.7 km	MPC · JPL
646749	2008 FN_{51}	—	February 13, 2008	Mount Lemmon	Mount Lemmon Survey	·	1.0 km	MPC · JPL
646750	2008 FK_{52}	—	March 12, 2008	Kitt Peak	Spacewatch	·	1.2 km	MPC · JPL
646751	2008 FM_{53}	—	March 28, 2008	Mount Lemmon	Mount Lemmon Survey	EUN	1.0 km	MPC · JPL
646752	2008 FW_{58}	—	March 5, 2008	Mount Lemmon	Mount Lemmon Survey	·	2.2 km	MPC · JPL
646753	2008 FE_{60}	—	February 7, 2008	Mount Lemmon	Mount Lemmon Survey	·	1.5 km	MPC · JPL
646754	2008 FE_{63}	—	March 27, 2008	Kitt Peak	Spacewatch	WIT	1.0 km	MPC · JPL
646755	2008 FO_{64}	—	February 13, 2008	Mount Lemmon	Mount Lemmon Survey	·	590 m	MPC · JPL
646756	2008 FQ_{65}	—	March 28, 2008	Mount Lemmon	Mount Lemmon Survey	·	1.1 km	MPC · JPL
646757	2008 FX_{71}	—	March 30, 2008	Kitt Peak	Spacewatch	·	1.2 km	MPC · JPL
646758	2008 FC_{74}	—	September 14, 2006	Kitt Peak	Spacewatch	H	410 m	MPC · JPL
646759	2008 FB_{75}	—	March 4, 2008	Mount Lemmon	Mount Lemmon Survey	·	1.2 km	MPC · JPL
646760	2008 FO_{80}	—	March 27, 2008	Mount Lemmon	Mount Lemmon Survey	VER	2.3 km	MPC · JPL
646761	2008 FK_{81}	—	March 11, 2008	Kitt Peak	Spacewatch	·	1.2 km	MPC · JPL
646762	2008 FO_{82}	—	March 11, 2008	Kitt Peak	Spacewatch	·	620 m	MPC · JPL
646763	2008 FB_{83}	—	March 28, 2008	Kitt Peak	Spacewatch	·	1.1 km	MPC · JPL
646764	2008 FE_{86}	—	February 28, 2008	Mount Lemmon	Mount Lemmon Survey	·	510 m	MPC · JPL
646765	2008 FV_{87}	—	March 4, 2008	Mount Lemmon	Mount Lemmon Survey	·	2.5 km	MPC · JPL
646766	2008 FW_{98}	—	March 30, 2008	Kitt Peak	Spacewatch	·	710 m	MPC · JPL
646767	2008 FG_{99}	—	March 30, 2008	Kitt Peak	Spacewatch	·	1.6 km	MPC · JPL
646768	2008 FR_{102}	—	March 30, 2008	Kitt Peak	Spacewatch	·	2.7 km	MPC · JPL
646769	2008 FX_{104}	—	March 30, 2008	Kitt Peak	Spacewatch	H	540 m	MPC · JPL
646770	2008 FW_{105}	—	March 10, 2008	Kitt Peak	Spacewatch	·	1.2 km	MPC · JPL
646771	2008 FO_{106}	—	March 31, 2008	Kitt Peak	Spacewatch	·	2.3 km	MPC · JPL
646772	2008 FW_{106}	—	March 31, 2008	Kitt Peak	Spacewatch	·	1.2 km	MPC · JPL
646773	2008 FP_{107}	—	March 31, 2008	Kitt Peak	Spacewatch	·	530 m	MPC · JPL
646774	2008 FS_{107}	—	March 31, 2008	Kitt Peak	Spacewatch	WIT	810 m	MPC · JPL
646775	2008 FS_{110}	—	March 31, 2008	Kitt Peak	Spacewatch	·	2.8 km	MPC · JPL
646776	2008 FC_{111}	—	March 31, 2008	Kitt Peak	Spacewatch	EUN	1.0 km	MPC · JPL
646777	2008 FW_{113}	—	March 31, 2008	Kitt Peak	Spacewatch	·	490 m	MPC · JPL
646778	2008 FK_{114}	—	March 28, 2008	Mount Lemmon	Mount Lemmon Survey	·	1.4 km	MPC · JPL
646779	2008 FC_{115}	—	March 31, 2008	Mount Lemmon	Mount Lemmon Survey	·	1.2 km	MPC · JPL
646780	2008 FP_{115}	—	April 11, 2005	Mount Lemmon	Mount Lemmon Survey	·	680 m	MPC · JPL
646781	2008 FH_{117}	—	March 31, 2008	Kitt Peak	Spacewatch	HYG	2.6 km	MPC · JPL
646782	2008 FQ_{119}	—	April 13, 2004	Kitt Peak	Spacewatch	·	1.4 km	MPC · JPL
646783	2008 FL_{120}	—	March 31, 2008	Mount Lemmon	Mount Lemmon Survey	·	1.4 km	MPC · JPL
646784	2008 FJ_{121}	—	March 31, 2008	Mount Lemmon	Mount Lemmon Survey	·	1.6 km	MPC · JPL
646785	2008 FP_{131}	—	March 26, 2008	Mount Lemmon	Mount Lemmon Survey	·	540 m	MPC · JPL
646786	2008 FC_{132}	—	March 16, 2008	Kitt Peak	Spacewatch	·	640 m	MPC · JPL
646787	2008 FE_{132}	—	March 26, 2008	Mount Lemmon	Mount Lemmon Survey	·	490 m	MPC · JPL
646788	2008 FA_{134}	—	March 28, 2008	Kitt Peak	Spacewatch	·	2.5 km	MPC · JPL
646789	2008 FK_{138}	—	March 26, 2004	Kitt Peak	Spacewatch	·	1.1 km	MPC · JPL
646790	2008 FV_{138}	—	March 29, 2008	Kitt Peak	Spacewatch	·	610 m	MPC · JPL
646791	2008 FR_{139}	—	March 31, 2008	Mount Lemmon	Mount Lemmon Survey	EUP	2.2 km	MPC · JPL
646792	2008 FT_{139}	—	March 30, 2008	Kitt Peak	Spacewatch	·	1.4 km	MPC · JPL
646793	2008 FF_{140}	—	March 29, 2008	Kitt Peak	Spacewatch	·	1.8 km	MPC · JPL
646794	2008 FS_{140}	—	March 31, 2008	Mount Lemmon	Mount Lemmon Survey	·	540 m	MPC · JPL
646795	2008 FW_{140}	—	March 29, 2008	Catalina	CSS	H	530 m	MPC · JPL
646796	2008 FZ_{140}	—	March 29, 2008	Catalina	CSS	·	700 m	MPC · JPL
646797	2008 FG_{141}	—	February 5, 2013	Mount Lemmon	Mount Lemmon Survey	·	2.4 km	MPC · JPL
646798	2008 FO_{141}	—	March 31, 2008	Mount Lemmon	Mount Lemmon Survey	·	1.1 km	MPC · JPL
646799	2008 FN_{142}	—	March 28, 2008	Kitt Peak	Spacewatch	H	390 m	MPC · JPL
646800	2008 FS_{142}	—	August 18, 2009	Kitt Peak	Spacewatch	·	1.3 km	MPC · JPL

== 646801–646900 ==
back to top

Designation			Discovery			Properties		Ref
Permanent	Provisional	Named after	Date	Site	Discoverer(s)	Category	Diam.	Ref
646801	2008 FD_{144}	—	September 12, 2015	Haleakala	Pan-STARRS 1	·	2.1 km	MPC · JPL
646802	2008 FJ_{144}	—	March 30, 2008	Kitt Peak	Spacewatch	·	2.8 km	MPC · JPL
646803	2008 FB_{145}	—	March 28, 2008	Mount Lemmon	Mount Lemmon Survey	·	2.2 km	MPC · JPL
646804	2008 FH_{145}	—	March 27, 2008	Kitt Peak	Spacewatch	·	2.2 km	MPC · JPL
646805	2008 FO_{145}	—	March 28, 2008	Mount Lemmon	Mount Lemmon Survey	·	1.2 km	MPC · JPL
646806	2008 FS_{145}	—	March 29, 2008	Kitt Peak	Spacewatch	·	2.5 km	MPC · JPL
646807	2008 FV_{145}	—	March 29, 2008	Kitt Peak	Spacewatch	V	510 m	MPC · JPL
646808	2008 FY_{148}	—	March 26, 2008	Mount Lemmon	Mount Lemmon Survey	·	2.2 km	MPC · JPL
646809	2008 FK_{149}	—	March 31, 2008	Mount Lemmon	Mount Lemmon Survey	·	1.0 km	MPC · JPL
646810	2008 FO_{149}	—	March 26, 2008	Mount Lemmon	Mount Lemmon Survey	·	2.0 km	MPC · JPL
646811	2008 FA_{150}	—	March 27, 2008	Kitt Peak	Spacewatch	·	2.4 km	MPC · JPL
646812	2008 GV_{2}	—	April 4, 2008	Junk Bond	D. Healy	·	3.6 km	MPC · JPL
646813	2008 GG_{3}	—	April 7, 2008	Catalina	CSS	H	600 m	MPC · JPL
646814	2008 GC_{5}	—	April 1, 2008	Kitt Peak	Spacewatch	·	520 m	MPC · JPL
646815	2008 GV_{7}	—	April 1, 2008	Kitt Peak	Spacewatch	·	540 m	MPC · JPL
646816	2008 GB_{10}	—	August 29, 2005	Kitt Peak	Spacewatch	·	640 m	MPC · JPL
646817	2008 GF_{11}	—	April 1, 2008	Kitt Peak	Spacewatch	·	620 m	MPC · JPL
646818	2008 GV_{13}	—	April 3, 2008	Mount Lemmon	Mount Lemmon Survey	EOS	1.3 km	MPC · JPL
646819	2008 GC_{15}	—	September 27, 2006	Kitt Peak	Spacewatch	·	1.3 km	MPC · JPL
646820	2008 GD_{16}	—	March 2, 2008	Kitt Peak	Spacewatch	·	660 m	MPC · JPL
646821	2008 GY_{17}	—	April 4, 2008	Kitt Peak	Spacewatch	·	2.4 km	MPC · JPL
646822	2008 GE_{18}	—	March 27, 2008	Kitt Peak	Spacewatch	·	1.3 km	MPC · JPL
646823	2008 GG_{19}	—	April 4, 2008	Mount Lemmon	Mount Lemmon Survey	·	3.2 km	MPC · JPL
646824	2008 GP_{19}	—	April 4, 2008	Mount Lemmon	Mount Lemmon Survey	VER	2.4 km	MPC · JPL
646825	2008 GQ_{19}	—	April 4, 2008	Mount Lemmon	Mount Lemmon Survey	·	2.2 km	MPC · JPL
646826	2008 GP_{24}	—	April 1, 2008	Mount Lemmon	Mount Lemmon Survey	·	1.0 km	MPC · JPL
646827	2008 GV_{24}	—	April 1, 2008	Mount Lemmon	Mount Lemmon Survey	·	1.1 km	MPC · JPL
646828	2008 GL_{28}	—	April 3, 2008	Kitt Peak	Spacewatch	·	1.5 km	MPC · JPL
646829	2008 GL_{29}	—	March 27, 2008	Mount Lemmon	Mount Lemmon Survey	·	2.4 km	MPC · JPL
646830	2008 GB_{31}	—	March 15, 2008	Kitt Peak	Spacewatch	·	3.0 km	MPC · JPL
646831	2008 GO_{31}	—	March 26, 2008	Kitt Peak	Spacewatch	ADE	1.7 km	MPC · JPL
646832	2008 GD_{32}	—	April 3, 2008	Kitt Peak	Spacewatch	·	1.5 km	MPC · JPL
646833	2008 GC_{38}	—	April 3, 2008	Kitt Peak	Spacewatch	·	590 m	MPC · JPL
646834	2008 GW_{39}	—	April 4, 2008	Kitt Peak	Spacewatch	·	610 m	MPC · JPL
646835	2008 GM_{40}	—	April 4, 2008	Mount Lemmon	Mount Lemmon Survey	TIR	2.1 km	MPC · JPL
646836	2008 GF_{42}	—	April 4, 2008	Kitt Peak	Spacewatch	·	350 m	MPC · JPL
646837	2008 GH_{42}	—	April 4, 2008	Kitt Peak	Spacewatch	·	990 m	MPC · JPL
646838	2008 GL_{44}	—	August 31, 2000	Kitt Peak	Spacewatch	·	1.3 km	MPC · JPL
646839	2008 GU_{49}	—	April 5, 2008	Kitt Peak	Spacewatch	·	1.3 km	MPC · JPL
646840	2008 GL_{51}	—	April 5, 2008	Mount Lemmon	Mount Lemmon Survey	·	970 m	MPC · JPL
646841	2008 GG_{53}	—	April 5, 2008	Mount Lemmon	Mount Lemmon Survey	·	520 m	MPC · JPL
646842	2008 GD_{54}	—	April 5, 2008	Mount Lemmon	Mount Lemmon Survey	·	430 m	MPC · JPL
646843	2008 GG_{60}	—	April 5, 2008	Kitt Peak	Spacewatch	·	550 m	MPC · JPL
646844	2008 GC_{61}	—	August 27, 2005	Kitt Peak	Spacewatch	·	1.4 km	MPC · JPL
646845	2008 GO_{61}	—	April 5, 2008	Mount Lemmon	Mount Lemmon Survey	·	2.2 km	MPC · JPL
646846	2008 GM_{63}	—	April 5, 2008	Kitt Peak	Spacewatch	VER	2.1 km	MPC · JPL
646847	2008 GA_{64}	—	April 5, 2008	Catalina	CSS	·	2.9 km	MPC · JPL
646848	2008 GL_{64}	—	February 10, 2008	Kitt Peak	Spacewatch	·	570 m	MPC · JPL
646849	2008 GE_{68}	—	March 29, 2008	Kitt Peak	Spacewatch	·	2.2 km	MPC · JPL
646850	2008 GO_{71}	—	April 7, 2008	Mount Lemmon	Mount Lemmon Survey	·	930 m	MPC · JPL
646851	2008 GL_{73}	—	April 7, 2008	Mount Lemmon	Mount Lemmon Survey	WIT	710 m	MPC · JPL
646852	2008 GY_{75}	—	April 7, 2008	Mount Lemmon	Mount Lemmon Survey	·	1.4 km	MPC · JPL
646853	2008 GG_{77}	—	April 7, 2008	Kitt Peak	Spacewatch	EOS	2.1 km	MPC · JPL
646854	2008 GQ_{78}	—	April 7, 2008	Kitt Peak	Spacewatch	·	2.3 km	MPC · JPL
646855	2008 GC_{79}	—	April 7, 2008	Kitt Peak	Spacewatch	·	1.6 km	MPC · JPL
646856	2008 GD_{79}	—	April 7, 2008	Kitt Peak	Spacewatch	·	1.2 km	MPC · JPL
646857	2008 GC_{80}	—	March 10, 2008	Mount Lemmon	Mount Lemmon Survey	·	1.3 km	MPC · JPL
646858	2008 GU_{88}	—	March 5, 2008	Kitt Peak	Spacewatch	LIX	2.9 km	MPC · JPL
646859	2008 GB_{91}	—	April 6, 2008	Mount Lemmon	Mount Lemmon Survey	(194)	1.7 km	MPC · JPL
646860	2008 GN_{91}	—	March 28, 2008	Mount Lemmon	Mount Lemmon Survey	·	600 m	MPC · JPL
646861	2008 GP_{97}	—	March 31, 2008	Kitt Peak	Spacewatch	·	620 m	MPC · JPL
646862	2008 GF_{99}	—	February 10, 2008	Mount Lemmon	Mount Lemmon Survey	·	530 m	MPC · JPL
646863	2008 GV_{101}	—	April 10, 2008	Kitt Peak	Spacewatch	·	1.4 km	MPC · JPL
646864	2008 GG_{102}	—	April 1, 2008	Kitt Peak	Spacewatch	·	1.1 km	MPC · JPL
646865	2008 GN_{102}	—	April 6, 2008	Kitt Peak	Spacewatch	·	2.6 km	MPC · JPL
646866	2008 GU_{102}	—	April 10, 2008	Kitt Peak	Spacewatch	V	610 m	MPC · JPL
646867	2008 GO_{103}	—	March 28, 2008	Kitt Peak	Spacewatch	·	1.3 km	MPC · JPL
646868	2008 GD_{105}	—	May 19, 2005	Mount Lemmon	Mount Lemmon Survey	·	600 m	MPC · JPL
646869	2008 GK_{108}	—	March 6, 2008	Mount Lemmon	Mount Lemmon Survey	ADE	1.7 km	MPC · JPL
646870	2008 GK_{114}	—	March 10, 2008	Mount Lemmon	Mount Lemmon Survey	·	1.8 km	MPC · JPL
646871	2008 GG_{116}	—	April 11, 2008	Mount Lemmon	Mount Lemmon Survey	MAR	780 m	MPC · JPL
646872	2008 GJ_{118}	—	October 31, 2006	Mount Lemmon	Mount Lemmon Survey	·	870 m	MPC · JPL
646873	2008 GH_{124}	—	April 28, 2004	Kitt Peak	Spacewatch	·	1.8 km	MPC · JPL
646874	2008 GO_{125}	—	April 14, 2008	Mount Lemmon	Mount Lemmon Survey	EUN	1.0 km	MPC · JPL
646875	2008 GL_{126}	—	October 16, 2006	Kitt Peak	Spacewatch	·	2.1 km	MPC · JPL
646876	2008 GP_{127}	—	April 14, 2008	Mount Lemmon	Mount Lemmon Survey	HNS	930 m	MPC · JPL
646877	2008 GO_{128}	—	April 10, 2008	Catalina	CSS	·	1.9 km	MPC · JPL
646878	2008 GH_{129}	—	April 3, 2008	Kitt Peak	Spacewatch	·	1.8 km	MPC · JPL
646879	2008 GT_{139}	—	April 6, 2008	Kitt Peak	Spacewatch	·	2.5 km	MPC · JPL
646880	2008 GG_{140}	—	April 6, 2008	Mount Lemmon	Mount Lemmon Survey	·	910 m	MPC · JPL
646881	2008 GK_{140}	—	April 7, 2008	Kitt Peak	Spacewatch	MRX	920 m	MPC · JPL
646882	2008 GP_{145}	—	April 7, 2008	Kitt Peak	Spacewatch	·	560 m	MPC · JPL
646883	2008 GY_{145}	—	April 13, 2008	Catalina	CSS	JUN	1.2 km	MPC · JPL
646884	2008 GF_{147}	—	September 2, 2014	Haleakala	Pan-STARRS 1	·	1.1 km	MPC · JPL
646885	2008 GG_{149}	—	April 4, 2008	Mount Lemmon	Mount Lemmon Survey	(2076)	660 m	MPC · JPL
646886	2008 GV_{149}	—	April 11, 2008	Kitt Peak	Spacewatch	EUP	3.1 km	MPC · JPL
646887	2008 GY_{149}	—	April 6, 2008	Kitt Peak	Spacewatch	·	2.4 km	MPC · JPL
646888	2008 GA_{151}	—	March 17, 2012	Mount Lemmon	Mount Lemmon Survey	(5)	1.0 km	MPC · JPL
646889	2008 GP_{151}	—	April 11, 2008	Mount Lemmon	Mount Lemmon Survey	·	2.6 km	MPC · JPL
646890	2008 GS_{151}	—	April 4, 2014	Haleakala	Pan-STARRS 1	·	2.2 km	MPC · JPL
646891	2008 GV_{151}	—	April 14, 2008	Mount Lemmon	Mount Lemmon Survey	·	710 m	MPC · JPL
646892	2008 GY_{151}	—	October 22, 2011	Kitt Peak	Spacewatch	·	2.9 km	MPC · JPL
646893	2008 GE_{152}	—	November 2, 2011	Mount Lemmon	Mount Lemmon Survey	·	2.4 km	MPC · JPL
646894	2008 GG_{152}	—	March 5, 2002	Apache Point	SDSS Collaboration	·	2.8 km	MPC · JPL
646895	2008 GD_{153}	—	April 7, 2008	Mount Lemmon	Mount Lemmon Survey	·	1.2 km	MPC · JPL
646896	2008 GK_{153}	—	April 11, 2008	Kitt Peak	Spacewatch	·	1.3 km	MPC · JPL
646897	2008 GQ_{153}	—	April 9, 2008	Kitt Peak	Spacewatch	·	520 m	MPC · JPL
646898	2008 GY_{153}	—	April 15, 2008	Kitt Peak	Spacewatch	L5	8.3 km	MPC · JPL
646899	2008 GE_{154}	—	March 19, 2017	Mount Lemmon	Mount Lemmon Survey	·	1.5 km	MPC · JPL
646900	2008 GH_{154}	—	March 12, 2016	Haleakala	Pan-STARRS 1	·	870 m	MPC · JPL

== 646901–647000 ==
back to top

Designation			Discovery			Properties		Ref
Permanent	Provisional	Named after	Date	Site	Discoverer(s)	Category	Diam.	Ref
646901	2008 GV_{154}	—	March 8, 2008	Kitt Peak	Spacewatch	·	470 m	MPC · JPL
646902	2008 GX_{154}	—	April 11, 2008	Kitt Peak	Spacewatch	·	1.5 km	MPC · JPL
646903	2008 GQ_{155}	—	January 12, 2016	Haleakala	Pan-STARRS 1	·	1.1 km	MPC · JPL
646904	2008 GA_{156}	—	January 17, 2016	Haleakala	Pan-STARRS 1	·	1.4 km	MPC · JPL
646905	2008 GB_{156}	—	November 21, 2014	Haleakala	Pan-STARRS 1	ADE	1.6 km	MPC · JPL
646906	2008 GD_{156}	—	February 23, 2012	Kitt Peak	Spacewatch	·	730 m	MPC · JPL
646907	2008 GP_{157}	—	November 25, 2009	Kitt Peak	Spacewatch	V	490 m	MPC · JPL
646908	2008 GQ_{157}	—	April 13, 2008	Kitt Peak	Spacewatch	·	660 m	MPC · JPL
646909	2008 GX_{157}	—	April 7, 2008	Kitt Peak	Spacewatch	·	2.1 km	MPC · JPL
646910	2008 GA_{158}	—	April 14, 2008	Kitt Peak	Spacewatch	·	740 m	MPC · JPL
646911	2008 GO_{158}	—	December 11, 2013	Haleakala	Pan-STARRS 1	·	630 m	MPC · JPL
646912	2008 GS_{158}	—	March 22, 2017	Haleakala	Pan-STARRS 1	·	1.6 km	MPC · JPL
646913	2008 GV_{158}	—	March 8, 2008	Kitt Peak	Spacewatch	·	670 m	MPC · JPL
646914	2008 GW_{158}	—	October 30, 2014	Haleakala	Pan-STARRS 1	·	1.1 km	MPC · JPL
646915	2008 GH_{159}	—	December 11, 2012	Mount Lemmon	Mount Lemmon Survey	·	2.5 km	MPC · JPL
646916	2008 GU_{159}	—	May 23, 2014	Haleakala	Pan-STARRS 1	URS	2.7 km	MPC · JPL
646917	2008 GV_{159}	—	May 18, 2017	Haleakala	Pan-STARRS 1	·	1.4 km	MPC · JPL
646918	2008 GB_{160}	—	March 13, 2012	Mount Lemmon	Mount Lemmon Survey	·	1.3 km	MPC · JPL
646919	2008 GF_{160}	—	April 7, 2008	Kitt Peak	Spacewatch	·	640 m	MPC · JPL
646920	2008 GC_{161}	—	April 7, 2008	Kitt Peak	Spacewatch	H	330 m	MPC · JPL
646921	2008 GB_{163}	—	November 6, 2016	Mount Lemmon	Mount Lemmon Survey	·	580 m	MPC · JPL
646922	2008 GD_{163}	—	April 14, 2008	Mount Lemmon	Mount Lemmon Survey	·	2.6 km	MPC · JPL
646923	2008 GO_{163}	—	January 15, 2018	Haleakala	Pan-STARRS 1	·	2.3 km	MPC · JPL
646924	2008 GP_{163}	—	August 27, 2016	Haleakala	Pan-STARRS 1	·	2.2 km	MPC · JPL
646925	2008 GR_{165}	—	April 15, 2008	Kitt Peak	Spacewatch	·	2.5 km	MPC · JPL
646926	2008 GD_{167}	—	April 4, 2008	Kitt Peak	Spacewatch	·	2.5 km	MPC · JPL
646927	2008 GM_{167}	—	April 4, 2008	Mount Lemmon	Mount Lemmon Survey	EUN	960 m	MPC · JPL
646928	2008 GN_{167}	—	April 1, 2008	Kitt Peak	Spacewatch	·	2.4 km	MPC · JPL
646929	2008 GS_{167}	—	April 7, 2008	Mount Lemmon	Mount Lemmon Survey	·	1 km	MPC · JPL
646930	2008 GE_{168}	—	April 11, 2008	Mount Lemmon	Mount Lemmon Survey	·	1.4 km	MPC · JPL
646931	2008 GG_{171}	—	April 5, 2008	Mount Lemmon	Mount Lemmon Survey	·	540 m	MPC · JPL
646932	2008 GD_{172}	—	April 15, 2008	Mount Lemmon	Mount Lemmon Survey	·	1.7 km	MPC · JPL
646933	2008 GW_{172}	—	April 1, 2008	Kitt Peak	Spacewatch	·	1.0 km	MPC · JPL
646934	2008 GZ_{173}	—	April 7, 2008	Kitt Peak	Spacewatch	·	1.5 km	MPC · JPL
646935	2008 GM_{176}	—	April 5, 2008	Mount Lemmon	Mount Lemmon Survey	·	2.4 km	MPC · JPL
646936	2008 GL_{177}	—	April 7, 2008	Kitt Peak	Spacewatch	·	740 m	MPC · JPL
646937	2008 GF_{179}	—	August 27, 2005	Palomar	NEAT	·	1.3 km	MPC · JPL
646938	2008 HS_{4}	—	April 7, 2008	Mount Lemmon	Mount Lemmon Survey	·	1.2 km	MPC · JPL
646939	2008 HH_{5}	—	April 3, 2008	Mount Lemmon	Mount Lemmon Survey	·	1.6 km	MPC · JPL
646940	2008 HA_{8}	—	April 24, 2008	Kitt Peak	Spacewatch	·	2.7 km	MPC · JPL
646941	2008 HS_{13}	—	April 9, 2008	Kitt Peak	Spacewatch	EUN	970 m	MPC · JPL
646942	2008 HV_{14}	—	March 12, 2008	Kitt Peak	Spacewatch	·	660 m	MPC · JPL
646943	2008 HZ_{15}	—	April 25, 2008	Kitt Peak	Spacewatch	TIR	2.5 km	MPC · JPL
646944	2008 HR_{23}	—	April 27, 2008	Kitt Peak	Spacewatch	·	1.8 km	MPC · JPL
646945	2008 HE_{24}	—	April 3, 2008	Mount Lemmon	Mount Lemmon Survey	·	2.2 km	MPC · JPL
646946	2008 HP_{24}	—	April 27, 2008	Kitt Peak	Spacewatch	·	1.6 km	MPC · JPL
646947	2008 HY_{34}	—	December 13, 2006	Kitt Peak	Spacewatch	EUN	1.2 km	MPC · JPL
646948	2008 HT_{36}	—	April 30, 2008	Kitt Peak	Spacewatch	·	1.2 km	MPC · JPL
646949	2008 HW_{40}	—	April 26, 2008	Mount Lemmon	Mount Lemmon Survey	·	810 m	MPC · JPL
646950	2008 HL_{42}	—	April 27, 2008	Kitt Peak	Spacewatch	·	1.4 km	MPC · JPL
646951	2008 HK_{48}	—	April 5, 2008	Mount Lemmon	Mount Lemmon Survey	·	2.4 km	MPC · JPL
646952	2008 HY_{49}	—	April 29, 2008	Kitt Peak	Spacewatch	·	1.6 km	MPC · JPL
646953	2008 HZ_{51}	—	April 11, 2008	Kitt Peak	Spacewatch	EUN	1.1 km	MPC · JPL
646954	2008 HB_{52}	—	March 29, 2008	Kitt Peak	Spacewatch	·	1.4 km	MPC · JPL
646955	2008 HK_{52}	—	April 14, 2008	Kitt Peak	Spacewatch	·	610 m	MPC · JPL
646956	2008 HX_{53}	—	April 6, 2008	Mount Lemmon	Mount Lemmon Survey	·	1.5 km	MPC · JPL
646957	2008 HQ_{60}	—	April 11, 2008	Mount Lemmon	Mount Lemmon Survey	·	1.7 km	MPC · JPL
646958	2008 HU_{63}	—	April 14, 2008	Kitt Peak	Spacewatch	BRU	2.2 km	MPC · JPL
646959	2008 HV_{65}	—	April 30, 2008	Kitt Peak	Spacewatch	·	1.7 km	MPC · JPL
646960	2008 HJ_{66}	—	April 26, 2008	Mount Lemmon	Mount Lemmon Survey	·	590 m	MPC · JPL
646961	2008 HC_{67}	—	April 24, 2008	Kitt Peak	Spacewatch	EUN	990 m	MPC · JPL
646962	2008 HQ_{70}	—	April 29, 2008	Mount Lemmon	Mount Lemmon Survey	·	2.8 km	MPC · JPL
646963	2008 HN_{71}	—	February 14, 2013	Mount Lemmon	Mount Lemmon Survey	·	2.9 km	MPC · JPL
646964	2008 HA_{72}	—	July 11, 2016	Haleakala	Pan-STARRS 1	·	780 m	MPC · JPL
646965	2008 HA_{73}	—	January 13, 2016	Haleakala	Pan-STARRS 1	·	1.7 km	MPC · JPL
646966	2008 HU_{73}	—	April 28, 2008	Mount Lemmon	Mount Lemmon Survey	·	1.4 km	MPC · JPL
646967	2008 HL_{74}	—	September 22, 2014	Haleakala	Pan-STARRS 1	·	2.1 km	MPC · JPL
646968	2008 HP_{74}	—	November 20, 2017	Mount Lemmon	Mount Lemmon Survey	·	2.3 km	MPC · JPL
646969	2008 HQ_{74}	—	April 26, 2008	Mount Lemmon	Mount Lemmon Survey	H	410 m	MPC · JPL
646970	2008 HD_{76}	—	April 30, 2008	Mount Lemmon	Mount Lemmon Survey	·	1.6 km	MPC · JPL
646971	2008 HO_{76}	—	November 23, 2014	Haleakala	Pan-STARRS 1	·	1.4 km	MPC · JPL
646972	2008 HS_{76}	—	October 14, 2010	Mount Lemmon	Mount Lemmon Survey	·	2.4 km	MPC · JPL
646973	2008 HX_{76}	—	April 27, 2017	Haleakala	Pan-STARRS 1	·	1.4 km	MPC · JPL
646974	2008 HV_{77}	—	April 29, 2008	Kitt Peak	Spacewatch	·	570 m	MPC · JPL
646975	2008 HN_{78}	—	April 24, 2008	Kitt Peak	Spacewatch	·	1.3 km	MPC · JPL
646976	2008 JC_{1}	—	April 29, 2008	Mount Lemmon	Mount Lemmon Survey	·	550 m	MPC · JPL
646977	2008 JQ_{5}	—	May 3, 2008	Mount Lemmon	Mount Lemmon Survey	·	2.4 km	MPC · JPL
646978	2008 JZ_{5}	—	April 15, 2008	Catalina	CSS	·	3.3 km	MPC · JPL
646979	2008 JO_{8}	—	April 7, 2008	Mount Lemmon	Mount Lemmon Survey	EUN	1.0 km	MPC · JPL
646980	2008 JT_{9}	—	April 7, 2008	Kitt Peak	Spacewatch	·	1.9 km	MPC · JPL
646981	2008 JQ_{13}	—	April 29, 2008	Kitt Peak	Spacewatch	·	1.4 km	MPC · JPL
646982	2008 JC_{19}	—	May 7, 2008	Mount Lemmon	Mount Lemmon Survey	PHO	740 m	MPC · JPL
646983	2008 JF_{19}	—	March 15, 2008	Kitt Peak	Spacewatch	·	1.2 km	MPC · JPL
646984	2008 JM_{21}	—	May 4, 2008	Siding Spring	SSS	·	2.1 km	MPC · JPL
646985	2008 JG_{24}	—	May 8, 2008	Siding Spring	SSS	·	3.2 km	MPC · JPL
646986	2008 JO_{27}	—	May 8, 2008	Kitt Peak	Spacewatch	·	1.6 km	MPC · JPL
646987	2008 JF_{29}	—	April 7, 2008	Mount Lemmon	Mount Lemmon Survey	TIR	3.1 km	MPC · JPL
646988	2008 JT_{32}	—	April 29, 2008	Kitt Peak	Spacewatch	·	1.1 km	MPC · JPL
646989	2008 JD_{36}	—	May 3, 2008	Mount Lemmon	Mount Lemmon Survey	·	530 m	MPC · JPL
646990	2008 JK_{42}	—	October 11, 2010	Kitt Peak	Spacewatch	·	2.8 km	MPC · JPL
646991	2008 JN_{42}	—	August 1, 2016	Haleakala	Pan-STARRS 1	·	3.2 km	MPC · JPL
646992	2008 JB_{43}	—	March 16, 2012	Mount Lemmon	Mount Lemmon Survey	·	1.1 km	MPC · JPL
646993	2008 JH_{43}	—	May 8, 2008	Mount Lemmon	Mount Lemmon Survey	·	1.7 km	MPC · JPL
646994	2008 JN_{43}	—	February 16, 2013	Kitt Peak	Spacewatch	·	2.5 km	MPC · JPL
646995	2008 JT_{43}	—	April 22, 2012	Kitt Peak	Spacewatch	·	910 m	MPC · JPL
646996	2008 JW_{43}	—	April 28, 1997	Kitt Peak	Spacewatch	H	510 m	MPC · JPL
646997	2008 JK_{45}	—	October 12, 2010	Mount Lemmon	Mount Lemmon Survey	·	1.4 km	MPC · JPL
646998	2008 JX_{45}	—	December 31, 2013	Haleakala	Pan-STARRS 1	·	690 m	MPC · JPL
646999	2008 JJ_{46}	—	May 3, 2008	Mount Lemmon	Mount Lemmon Survey	·	3.5 km	MPC · JPL
647000	2008 JC_{47}	—	October 16, 2009	Mount Lemmon	Mount Lemmon Survey	·	480 m	MPC · JPL

back to top

== Meaning of names ==
As minor planet discoveries are confirmed, they are given a permanent number by the IAU's Minor Planet Center (MPC), and the discoverers can then submit names for them, following the IAU's naming conventions. The list below concerns those minor planets in the specified number-range that have received names, and explains the meanings of those names.

Official naming citations of newly named small Solar System bodies are approved and published in a bulletin by IAU's Working Group for Small Bodies Nomenclature (WGSBN). Before May 2021, citations were published in MPC's Minor Planet Circulars for many decades. Recent citations can also be found on the JPL Small-Body Database (SBDB). Until his death in 2016, German astronomer Lutz D. Schmadel compiled these citations into the Dictionary of Minor Planet Names (DMP) and regularly updated the collection.

Based on Paul Herget's The Names of the Minor Planets, Schmadel also researched the unclear origin of numerous asteroids, most of which had been named prior to World War II. This article incorporates text from this source, which is in the public domain: SBDB New namings may only be added to this list below after official publication as the preannouncement of names is condemned. The WGSBN publishes a comprehensive guideline for the naming rules of non-cometary small Solar System bodies.

Named minor planet	Provisional	This minor planet was named for...	Ref · Catalog
646505 Mihăileanu	2008 DF_{17}	Radu Mihăileanu, Romanian-born French film director and screenwriter.	IAU · 646505
646626 Valentingrigore	2008 EB_{155}	Valentin Grigore (b. 1968), the founder and president of the Romanian Society for Meteors and Astronomy	IAU · 646626
646684 Boaca	2008 EY_{182}	Mihai Boaca (1952–2021), a Romanian land surveyor, renowned cartoonist and amateur astronomer.	IAU · 646684
