= List of Aten asteroids =

This is a list of Aten asteroids, a group of near-Earth objects. As of January 2017, there are 1125 known Atens, most of which remain provisionally designated without a number, as they have not been observed at two or more oppositions. The list is divided into named members, brightest, notable and other record holding Aten asteroids. For a list of existing articles, see Aten asteroids (category).

== Named Atens ==
Aten asteroids are generally named after Egyptian deities. As of February 2024, a total of fourteen Aten asteroids have received a name. They are listed in chronological order of discovery.

Number	Name	Year	Discoverer
2062	Aten	1976	Eleanor F. Helin
2340	Hathor	1976	Charles T. Kowal
2100	Ra-Shalom	1978	Eleanor F. Helin
3362	Khufu	1984	R. Scott Dunbar, Maria A. Barucci
3554	Amun	1986	Carolyn S. Shoemaker, Eugene M. Shoemaker
3753	Cruithne	1986	J. Duncan Waldron
5381	Sekhmet	1991	Carolyn S. Shoemaker
136818	Selqet	1997	Roy Tucker
326290	Akhenaten	1998	Roy Tucker
66391	Moshup	1999	LINEAR
524522	Zoozve	2002	LONEOS
99942	Apophis	2004	Roy Tucker, David J. Tholen and Fabrizio Bernardi
398188	Agni	2010	WISE
367943	Duende	2012	Observatorio Astronómico de La Sagra (OAM)

The February 15, 2013 Earth encounter shortened 367943 Duende's orbital period to about 317 days, changing its orbital class from Apollo to Aten.

== Brightest Atens ==
The following lists Aten asteroids thought to be larger than 2 kilometers across. Assuming an albedo of 0.15, this converts to an absolute magnitude of about 16.2

Designation	Discovery date	Absolute magnitude	Diameter (km)	Catalog
(66146) 1998 TU_{3}	1998/10/13	14.5	3–7	list entry
(137170) 1999 HF_{1}	1999/04/20	14.5	3–7	list entry
3753 Cruithne	1986/10/10	15.6	2–5	list entry
(152931) 2000 EA_{107}	2000/03/15	15.8	2–4	list entry
(105140) 2000 NL_{10}	2000/07/10	15.8	2–4	list entry
3554 Amun	1986/03/04	15.82	2.33–2.82	list entry
(87684) 2000 SY_{2}	2000/09/20	16.0	2–4	list entry
2100 Ra-Shalom	1978/09/10	16.05	2.05–2.59	list entry
(96590) 1998 SB	1998/12/01	16.2	1–3	list entry

== Selection of designated Atens ==
Name	Year	Discoverer ^{A}	Catalog
(5590) 1990 VA	1990	Spacewatch	list entry
(5604) 1992 FE	1992	Robert H. McNaught	list entry
(33342) 1998 WT24	1998	LINEAR	list entry
(65679) 1989 UQ	1989	Christian Pollas	list entry
(66063) 1998 RO1	1998	LINEAR	list entry
(66146) 1998 TU_{3}	1998	LINEAR	list entry
66391 Moshup	1999	LINEAR	list entry
(66400) 1999 LT_{7}	1999	LINEAR	list entry
(68347) 2001 KB_{67}	2001	LINEAR	list entry
(85770) 1998 UP1	1998	LINEAR	list entry
(85953) 1999 FK_{21}	1999	LINEAR	list entry
(85989) 1999 JD6	1999	LONEOS	list entry
(86450) 2000 CK_{33}	2000	LINEAR	list entry
(86667) 2000 FO_{10}	2000	LINEAR	list entry
(87309) 2000 QP	2000	LINEAR	list entry
(87684) 2000 SY_{2}	2000	LINEAR	list entry
(88213) 2001 AF_{2}	2001	LINEAR	list entry
(96590) 1998 XB	1998	BAO Schmidt CCD Asteroid Program	list entry
(99907) 1989 VA	1989	Carolyn S. Shoemaker, Eugene M. Shoemaker	list entry
(137924) 2000 BD19	2000	LINEAR	list entry
2002 AA29	2002	LINEAR	MPC
2003 YN107	2003	LINEAR	MPC
2004 FH	2004	LINEAR	MPC
2004 FU162	2004	LINEAR	MPC
2013 BS45	2013	Spacewatch, James V. Scotti	MPC
2013 ND15	2013	Pan-STARRS	MPC
2014 HQ124	2014	NEOWISE	MPC
2014 OL339	2014	EURONEAR	MPC
^{(A)} LINEAR: Lincoln Near-Earth Asteroid Research

== Record-holding Atens ==
The following is a list of current records for Aten asteroids

Discovery Records
Record	Object	Date	
First Detected	(363505) 2003 UC20	5 December 1954	
First Confirmed	2062 Aten	7 January 1976	
Physical Records
Record	Object	Absolute magnitude	Diameter
Brightest	(137170) 1999 HF1	14.5	4.3 km
Brightest (numbered)	(66146) 1998 TU3	14.7	3.6 km
Brightest (named)	3753 Cruithne	15.1	3.3 km
Smallest (named)	3362 Khufu	18.3	700 m
Dimmest	2003 SW130	29.1	5 m
Dimmest (numbered)	(68347) 2001 KB67	19.9	505 m
Dimmest (named)	2340 Hathor	19.2	210 m
Orbital Records
Perihelion Records	Object	q (AU)	notes
Smallest	(137924) 2000 BD19	0.092	smallest of all asteroids
Smallest (named)	2340 Hathor	0.464	
Largest (numbered)	2062 Aten	0.790	
Largest	2002 AA29	0.984	Earth Co-Orbital
Semi-Major Axis Records	Object	a (AU)	notes
Smallest	2019 BE5	0.610	
Smallest (numbered)	66391 Moshup	0.642	
Smallest (named)	2100 Ra-Shalom	0.832	
Largest (numbered)	3753 Cruithne	0.998	Earth Co-Orbital
Largest	(85770) 1998 UP1	0.999	In Earth's Zone of Influence
Aphelion Records	Object	Q (AU)	notes
Smallest	(434326) 2004 JG6	0.973	Apohele asteroid, smallest of all asteroids
Smallest (numbered)	(33342) 1998 WT24	1.019	smallest of all numbered asteroids
Smallest (named)	2062 Aten	1.143	smallest of all named asteroids
Largest (named)	3753 Cruithne	1.511	Earth Co-Orbital
Largest	(66063) 1998 RO1	1.705	In Earth's Zone of Influence, Binary
Eccentricity Records	Object	e	notes
Smallest	2002 AA29	0.013	Earth Co-Orbital
Smallest (numbered)	2062 Aten	0.183	
Largest (named)	3753 Cruithne	0.515	Earth Co-Orbital
Largest	(137924) 2000 BD19	0.895	
Inclination Records	Object	i (deg)	notes
Smallest	2004 FH	0.0°	
Smallest (numbered)	(65679) 1989 UQ	1.3°	
Smallest (named)	2340 Hathor	5.9°	
Largest (numbered)	5381 Sekhmet	49.0°	
Largest	(333889) 1998 SV4	53.3°	
