= 2020 PN1 =

Sub-kilometer asteroid classified as a near-Earth object of the Aten group

2020 PN_{1}
Discovery
- Discovered by: ATLAS-HKO
- Discovery site: Haleakalā Observatory
- Discovery date: 12 August 2020

Designations
- Designation: 2020 PN_{1}
- Minor planet category: Aten; NEO; Earth crosser

Orbital characteristics
- Epoch 31 May 2020 (JD 2459000.5)
- Uncertainty parameter 0
- Observation arc: 361 days
- Aphelion: 1.12482093 AU
- Perihelion: 0.8713906 AU
- Semi-major axis: 0.998105754 AU
- Eccentricity: 0.1269557
- Orbital period (sidereal): 1.00 y (364.219560 d)
- Mean anomaly: 32.06964°
- Inclination: 4.80807°
- Longitude of ascending node: 145.63610°
- Argument of perihelion: 55.40365°
- Earth MOID: 0.0248258 AU

Physical characteristics
- Dimensions: 10–50 m^{[a]}
- Absolute magnitude (H): 25.5

2020 PN_{1} is a sub-kilometer asteroid, classified as a near-Earth object of the Aten group, that is a temporary horseshoe companion to the Earth. There are dozens of known Earth horseshoe librators, some of which switch periodically between the quasi-satellite and the horseshoe co-orbital states.

== Discovery ==
2020 PN_{1} was discovered on 12 August 2020 by L. Denneau, J. Tonry, A. Heinze, and H. Weiland observing for the ATLAS-HKO Survey. As of 20 January 2021, it has been observed 41 times with an observation arc of 361 days.

== Orbit and orbital evolution ==
2020 PN_{1} is currently an Aten asteroid (Earth-crossing but with a period less than a year). Its semi-major axis (currently 0.998105754 AU) is similar to that of Earth (0.999789 AU), but it has a moderate eccentricity (0.1269557) and low orbital inclination (4.80807°). It alternates between being an Aten asteroid and being an Apollo asteroid, although its orbital evolution is not fully stable and it can be considered as a temporary co-orbital companion to the Earth.

== Physical properties ==
With an absolute magnitude of 25.5 mag, it has a diameter in the range of 10–50 meters (for an assumed albedo range of 0.04–0.20, respectively).

== Exploration ==
2020 PN_{1} was pre-selected for an exploration by a Chinese mission of planetary defense including an impactor and a separate orbiter planned to launch in 2026. However, in April 2023, the new target is 2019 VL_{5}.

== See also ==
- 54509 YORP
- (419624) 2010 SO16
- 3753 Cruithne
- 2015 SO2
- 2015 XX169
- 2015 YQ1
- 2015 YA

== Notes ==
- This is assuming an albedo of 0.20–0.04.
