= 2020 PP1 =

Near-Earth asteroid

2020 PP_{1}
Discovery
- Discovered by: Pan-STARRS 1
- Discovery site: Haleakalā Obs.
- Discovery date: 12 August 2020

Designations
- Alternative designations: P113Iyv
- Minor planet category: NEO; Apollo; Earth crosser

Orbital characteristics
- Epoch 1 July 2021 (JD 2459396.5)
- Uncertainty parameter 1
- Observation arc: 3.94 yr (1,438 days)
- Earliest precovery date: 24 August 2017
- Aphelion: 1.075 AU
- Perihelion: 0.9278 AU
- Semi-major axis: 1.001 AU
- Eccentricity: 0.07356
- Orbital period (sidereal): 3.99 yr
- Mean anomaly: 87.711°
- Mean motion: 0° 59^{m} 0.667^{s} / day
- Inclination: 5.8636°
- Longitude of ascending node: 140.603°
- Time of perihelion: 2 April 2021 19:40 UT
- Argument of perihelion: 43.210°
- Earth MOID: 0.03257 AU
- T_{Jupiter}: 6.066

Physical characteristics
- Mean diameter: 10–30 m (assumed albedo 0.04–0.20)
- Apparent magnitude: 20.4 (at discovery)
- Absolute magnitude (H): 26.7 · 26.6

2020 PP_{1} is a sub-kilometer asteroid, classified as a near-Earth object of the Apollo group, that is a stable quasi-satellite of the Earth. There are over a dozen known Earth quasi-satellites, some of which switch periodically between the quasi-satellite and horseshoe co-orbital states.

== Discovery ==
2020 PP_{1} was discovered on 12 August 2020 by the Pan-STARRS 1 survey at the Haleakalā Observatory. It was later recovered by the Karl Schwarzschild Observatory in August 2021, which allowed for precovery in earlier Pan-STARRS observations from 24 July 2017.

== Orbit and orbital evolution ==
2020 PP_{1} is currently an Apollo asteroid (Earth-crossing but with a period longer than a year). Its semi-major axis (currently 1.001715 AU) is similar to that of Earth (0.999789 AU), but it has both low eccentricity (0.07384) and low orbital inclination (5.827°). It alternates between being an Aten asteroid and being an Apollo asteroid, although its orbital evolution is not fully stable and it can be considered as a temporary quasi-satellite of the Earth; its orbital evolution is akin to that of 469219 Kamoʻoalewa.

== Physical properties ==
With an absolute magnitude of 26.6, it has a diameter in the range 10–30 meters (for an assumed albedo range of 0.20–0.04 respectively).

== See also ==
- 3753 Cruithne
- 54509 YORP
- (419624) 2010 SO16
- 469219 Kamoʻoalewa
- 2015 SO2
- 2015 XX169
- 2015 YQ1
- 2015 YA
