= 2009 BD =

Small near-Earth asteroid

Discovery
- Discovered by: Mount Lemmon Survey
- Discovery site: Catalina Mountains north of Tucson, Arizona, USA
- Discovery date: 16 January 2009

Designations
- Designation: 2009 BD
- Alternative names: MPO 201128
- Minor planet category: NEO · Apollo

Orbital characteristics
- Epoch 21 November 2025 (JD 2461000.5)
- Uncertainty parameter 1
- Observation arc: 885 days (2.42 yr)
- Aphelion: 1.11723387 AU (167.135808 Gm)
- Perihelion: 1.00697053 AU (150.640647 Gm)
- Semi-major axis: 1.06210220 AU (158.888228 Gm)
- Eccentricity: 0.05190806
- Orbital period (sidereal): 1.095 yr (399.80 d)
- Mean anomaly: 119.74017°
- Mean motion: 0° 54^{m} 1.583^{s} /day
- Inclination: 1.26733118°
- Longitude of ascending node: 253.15632°
- Argument of perihelion: 316.65987°
- Earth MOID: 0.00322842 AU (482,965 km)

Physical characteristics
- Dimensions: 7–15 m
- Mean density: ~0.64 g/cm^{3}
- Absolute magnitude (H): 28.1; 28.43 ± 0.12

2009 BD is a very small asteroid, approximately 10 meters in diameter, which is classified as a near-Earth object of the Apollo group and as an Earth co-orbital asteroid.

== Orbit ==
During the 2011 opposition, the last opposition of 2009 BD that was observed, 2009 BD approached on 2 June 2011 within 0.00231 AU (346,000 km) of the Earth, which is less than 1 lunar distance. For comparison, the distance to the Moon is about 0.0026 AU (384,400 km).

With an orbital period of 399.80 days, 2009 BD is in a near 1:1 orbital resonance with Earth, and also has about the same orbit around the Sun as Earth. Other resonant near-Earth objects in addition to 2009 BD include 3753 Cruithne (the first to be discovered), (85770) 1998 UP1, 54509 YORP, 2001 GO2, 2002 AA29, 2003 YN107, 164207 Cardea, and (706765) 2010 TK7 (an Earth trojan).

The Jupiter Tisserand invariant, used to distinguish different kinds of orbits, is 5.801. The orbit has a small inclination of about 1.27 degrees.

JPL and MPC give different parameters for the orbit of 2009 BD, affecting whether the orbit type should be considered an Apollo asteroid or an Amor asteroid. JPL includes non-gravitational acceleration parameters in the orbital solution.

== Physical characteristics ==
Because 2009 BD is a very small multi-opposition near-Earth object, the effect of radiation pressure on the orbit caused by light from the Sun was able to be detected. The radiation-related acceleration allowed the Area to Mass Ratio (AMR) to be estimated at (2.97 ± 0.33) × 10^{−4} m^{2}/kg. Assuming an albedo of 0.12, a typical average for asteroids in the inner solar system, this AMR corresponds to a density of about 640 kg/m^{3}. This density is consistent with the density of very porous rock. For comparison, the asteroid 2006 RH120 has a measured density of about 400 kg/m^{3}, and the density of the asteroid 253 Mathilde as measured by the NEAR-Shoemaker space probe was 1300 kg/m^{3}. In contrast, the density of the man-made near-Earth object 6Q0B44E is 15 kg/m^{3}.
