= 2015 YQ1 =

Near-Earth horseshoe asteroid

2015 YQ_{1}
Discovery
- Discovered by: Mount Lemmon Srvy.
- Discovery site: Mount Lemmon Obs.
- Discovery date: 19 December 2015

Designations
- Designation: 2015 YQ_{1}
- Minor planet category: Apollo asteroid; Earth crosser

Orbital characteristics
- Epoch 13 January 2016 (JD 2457400.5)
- Uncertainty parameter 6
- Observation arc: 3 days
- Aphelion: 1.40586 AU
- Perihelion: 0.59681 AU
- Semi-major axis: 1.00134 AU
- Eccentricity: 0.40398
- Orbital period (sidereal): 1.00202 y (365.99 d)
- Mean anomaly: 317.067°
- Inclination: 2.4865°
- Longitude of ascending node: 88.89770°
- Argument of perihelion: 112.185°
- Earth MOID: 0.00052 AU

Physical characteristics
- Dimensions: 7–16 m^{[a]}
- Absolute magnitude (H): 28.1

2015 YQ_{1} is an Apollo asteroid that is a temporary horseshoe companion to the Earth, the twelfth known Earth horseshoe librator. It experienced a close encounter with the Earth on 22 December 2015 at 0.0037 AU.

== Discovery ==
2015 YQ_{1} was discovered on 19 December 2015 by A. D. Grauer observing with the 1.5-m reflector telescope at the Mount Lemmon Survey. As of 9 March 2016, it has been observed 64 times with an observation arc of 3 days.

== Orbit and orbital evolution ==
Animation of 2015 YQ1's orbit relative to Sun and Earth 2015 YQ1 · Sun · Earth

2015 YQ_{1} is currently an Apollo asteroid (Earth-crossing but with a period greater than a year). Its semi-major axis (currently 1.00134 astronomical units; AU) is similar to that of Earth (1.00074 AU), but it has a relatively high eccentricity (0.40398) and low orbital inclination (2.4865°). It alternates between being an Aten asteroid and being an Apollo asteroid. As of 9 March 2016, this object is the 17th known Earth co-orbital and the 12th known object following a horseshoe path with respect to our planet. Asteroid 2015 YQ_{1} follows an asymmetrical horseshoe path with respect to our planet; the value of its relative mean longitude oscillates about 180°, but enclosing 0°; its orbital evolution is rather unstable.

== Physical properties ==
With an absolute magnitude of 28.1 mag, it has a diameter in the range 7–16 meters (for an assumed albedo range of 0.04–0.20, respectively).

== See also ==
- 54509 YORP
- (419624) 2010 SO16
- 3753 Cruithne
- 2015 SO2
- 2015 XX169
- 2015 YA

== Notes ==
- This is assuming an albedo of 0.20–0.04.
