= 2013 BS45 =

Asteroid

2013 BS_{45}
Discovery
- Discovered by: James V. Scotti (Spacewatch)
- Discovery date: 20 January 2013

Designations
- Minor planet category: Aten; NEO; Earth crosser

Orbital characteristics
- Epoch 13 January 2016 (JD 2457400.5)
- Uncertainty parameter 0
- Observation arc: 375 days (1.03 yr)
- Aphelion: 1.0758430 AU (160.94382 Gm)
- Perihelion: 0.9093608 AU (136.03844 Gm)
- Semi-major axis: 0.9926019 AU (148.49113 Gm)
- Eccentricity: 0.0838615
- Orbital period (sidereal): 0.99 yr (361.2 d)
- Mean anomaly: 257.52229°
- Mean motion: 0° 59^{m} 47.93^{s} /day
- Inclination: 0.7726189°
- Longitude of ascending node: 83.40080°
- Argument of perihelion: 150.3038°
- Earth MOID: 0.0114221 AU (1.70872 Gm)
- Jupiter MOID: 3.89526 AU (582.723 Gm)

Physical characteristics
- Dimensions: 20–40 m^{[a]}
- Absolute magnitude (H): 25.9

2013 BS_{45} is a horseshoe companion to the Earth like 3753 Cruithne. Like Cruithne, it does not orbit the Earth in the normal sense and at times it is on the other side of the Sun, yet it still periodically comes nearer to the Earth in sort of halo orbit before again drifting away. While not a traditional natural satellite, it does not quite have normal heliocentric orbit either and these are sometimes called quasi-satellites or horseshoe orbits.

== Discovery, orbit and physical properties ==
2013 BS_{45} was discovered by James V. Scotti on 20 January 2013, observing for the Spacewatch project from Kitt Peak (KPNO). Its orbit is characterized by low eccentricity (0.084), low inclination (0.77º) and a semi-major axis of 0.993 AU; it is the most Earth-like among those of asteroids moving in Earth-like orbits. Upon discovery, it was classified as an Aten asteroid but also an Earth crosser by the Minor Planet Center. Its orbit is well determined; as of 26 August 2015, its orbit is based on 96 observations spanning a data-arc of 375 days. 2013 BS_{45} has an absolute magnitude of 25.9 which gives a characteristic diameter of 30 m. Radar observations indicate that it may be a very rapid rotator with a period of just a few minutes.

== Horseshoe companion to the Earth and orbital evolution ==
Recent calculations indicate that it follows a horseshoe orbit with respect to the Earth. Its orbital evolution is highly chaotic and its orbit is difficult to predict beyond a few thousand years. As for the available data, it had its closest encounter ever with Earth on 12 February 2013 at 0.013 AU, closer than in 1934, the previously closest approach at 0.014 AU. The next approach closer than 0.020 AU will take place on 2 September 2090 at 0.016 AU. Its orbit matches the expected properties of that of an object in the Arjuna class.

== Origin ==
2013 BS_{45} may have originated within the Venus-Earth-Mars region; alternatively, it may have come from the main asteroid belt like other Near-Earth Objects, then transitioned to an Amor-class asteroid before entering Earth's co-orbital region.

== See also ==
- 3753 Cruithne
- 2001 GO2
- 2002 AA29
- 2003 YN107
- 2006 JY26
- 2009 SH2
- 2010 SO16
- 2012 FC71
- Orbital resonance

== Notes ==
- This is assuming an albedo of 0.20–0.04.
