= 2015 XX169 =

Near-Earth asteroid

2015 XX_{169}
Discovery
- Discovered by: R. G. Matheny; Mount Lemmon Srvy.
- Discovery site: Mount Lemmon Obs.
- Discovery date: 9 December 2015

Designations
- Designation: 2015 XX_{169}
- Minor planet category: Apollo, Earth crosser

Orbital characteristics
- Epoch 16 February 2017 (JD 2457800.5)
- Uncertainty parameter 1
- Observation arc: 363 days
- Aphelion: 1.18545 AU
- Perihelion: 0.81648 AU
- Semi-major axis: 1.00097 AU
- Eccentricity: 0.18431
- Orbital period (sidereal): 1.00149 y (365.79 d)
- Mean anomaly: 345.528°
- Inclination: 7.640°
- Longitude of ascending node: 256.630°
- Argument of perihelion: 283.587°
- Earth MOID: 0.0154 AU

Physical characteristics
- Dimensions: 9–22 m (Note: This is assuming an albedo of 0.20–0.04.)
- Absolute magnitude (H): 27.4

2015 XX_{169} is an Apollo asteroid that is a temporary horseshoe companion to the Earth, the tenth known Earth horseshoe librator. A close encounter with the Earth on 14 December 2015 caused the value of the semi-major axis of 2015 XX_{169} to drift slowly upwards, and the object evolved from an Aten asteroid to an Apollo asteroid about a year after this close approach.

== Discovery ==
2015 XX_{169} was discovered on 9 December 2015 by R. G. Matheny observing with the 1.5-m reflector telescope at the Mount Lemmon Survey. As of 6 December 2016, it has been observed 47 times with an observation arc of 363 days.

== Orbit and orbital evolution ==
2015 XX_{169} is currently an Apollo asteroid (Earth-crossing but with a period greater than a year). Its semi-major axis (currently 1.00096 AU) is similar to that of Earth (1.00074 AU), but it has a relatively low eccentricity (0.18431) and moderate orbital inclination (7.640°). It alternates between being an Apollo asteroid and being an Aten asteroid, changing dynamical status approximately every 130 years. As of 9 March 2016, this object is the 15th known Earth co-orbital and the 10th known object following a horseshoe path with respect to the planet. 2015 XX_{169} follows an asymmetrical horseshoe path with respect to our planet; the value of its relative mean longitude oscillates about 180°, but enclosing 0°.

== Physical properties ==
With an absolute magnitude of 27.4, it has a diameter in the range of 9–22 meters (for an assumed albedo range of 0.20–0.04, respectively).

== See also ==
- 54509 YORP
- (419624) 2010 SO16
- 3753 Cruithne
- 2015 SO2
- 2015 YA
- 2015 YQ1
