= 2015 YA =

Near-Earth horseshoe

Discovery
- Discovered by: Catalina Sky Srvy.
- Discovery site: Mount Lemmon Obs.
- Discovery date: 16 December 2015

Designations
- Designation: 2015 YA
- Minor planet category: Aten; NEO; Earth crosser

Orbital characteristics
- Epoch 13 January 2016 (JD 2457400.5)
- Uncertainty parameter 6
- Observation arc: 5 days
- Aphelion: 1.27598 AU
- Perihelion: 0.71908 AU
- Semi-major axis: 0.99753 AU
- Eccentricity: 0.2791
- Orbital period (sidereal): 0.99632 y (363.91 d)
- Mean anomaly: 99.79°
- Inclination: 1.6249°
- Longitude of ascending node: 255.3291°
- Argument of perihelion: 83.849°
- Earth MOID: 0.00356 AU

Physical characteristics
- Dimensions: 9–22 m^{[a]}
- Absolute magnitude (H): 27.4

2015 YA is a sub-kilometer asteroid, classified as a near-Earth object of the Aten group, that is a temporary horseshoe companion to the Earth. It is the 11th known Earth horseshoe librator. Prior to a close encounter with the Earth on 15 December 2015, 2015 YA was an Apollo asteroid.

== Discovery ==
2015 YA was discovered on 16 December 2015 by G. J. Leonard and R. G. Matheny observing for the Catalina Sky Survey. As of 9 March 2016, it has been observed 47 times with an observation arc of 5 days.

== Orbit and orbital evolution ==
Animation of 2015 YA's orbit relative to Sun and Earth 2015 YA · Sun · Earth

2015 YA is currently an Aten asteroid (Earth-crossing but with a period less than a year). Its semi-major axis (currently 0.99753 AU) is similar to that of Earth (1.00074 AU), but it has a moderate eccentricity (0.2791) and very low orbital inclination (1.6249°). It alternates between being an Aten asteroid and being an Apollo asteroid, although its orbital evolution is rather chaotic. As of 9 March 2016, this object is the 16th known Earth co-orbital and the 11th known object following a horseshoe path with respect to our planet. Asteroid 2015 YA follows an asymmetrical horseshoe path with respect to our planet; the value of its relative mean longitude oscillates about 180°, but enclosing 0°.

== Physical properties ==
With an absolute magnitude of 27.4 mag, it has a diameter in the range 9–22 meters (for an assumed albedo range of 0.04–0.20, respectively).

== See also ==
- 54509 YORP
- (419624) 2010 SO16
- 3753 Cruithne
- 2015 SO2
- 2015 XX169
- 2015 YQ1

== Notes ==
- This is assuming an albedo of 0.20–0.04.
