= 2017 FZ2 =

Near-Earth micro-asteroid and quasi-satellite

2017 FZ_{2}
Discovery
- Discovered by: Mt. Lemmon Survey; G. J. Leonard (unofficial credits)
- Discovery site: Mount Lemmon Obs.
- Discovery date: March 19, 2017

Designations
- Minor planet category: NEO · Apollo; Earth crosser

Orbital characteristics
- Epoch September 4, 2017 (JD 2458000.5)
- Uncertainty parameter 3
- Observation arc: 8 days
- Aphelion: 1.2730773 AU (190.44965 Gm)
- Perihelion: 0.741200 AU (110.8819 Gm)
- Semi-major axis: 1.0071385 AU (150.66578 Gm)
- Eccentricity: 0.264054
- Orbital period (sidereal): 1.01 yr (369.1749 d)
- Mean anomaly: 87.30597°
- Mean motion: 0° 58^{m} 30.531^{s} /day
- Inclination: 1.81167°
- Longitude of ascending node: 185.86918°
- Argument of perihelion: 100.32304°
- Earth MOID: 0.0014 AU · 0.5 LD

Physical characteristics
- Dimensions: 13–30 m^{[a]}
- Absolute magnitude (H): 26.7

2017 FZ_{2} is a micro-asteroid and near-Earth object of the Apollo group that was a quasi-satellite of the Earth until March 23, 2017.

== Discovery, orbit and physical properties ==
2017 FZ_{2} was discovered by American astronomer Gregory Leonard on March 19, 2017, observing for the Mt. Lemmon Survey from Mount Lemmon Observatory. Its orbit is moderately eccentric (0.26), low inclination (1.81º) and a semi-major axis of 1.007 AU. Upon discovery, it was classified as an Apollo asteroid but also an Earth crosser by the Minor Planet Center. Its orbit is very chaotic but it is relatively well determined; as of September 26, 2017, its orbit is based on 52 observations (1 Doppler) spanning a data-arc of 8 days. 2017 FZ_{2} has an absolute magnitude of 26.7 which gives a characteristic diameter of 20 m.

== Quasi-satellite ==
2017 FZ_{2} was until very recently an Earth co-orbital, the sixth known terrestrial quasi-satellite and the smallest by far. Its most recent quasi-satellite episode may have started over 225 years ago and certainly ended after a close encounter with the Earth on March 23, 2017.

== Candidate asteroid family ==
A number of other near-Earth asteroids move in orbits similar to that of 2017 FZ_{2}, the largest being 54509 YORP. There is an apparent excess of small bodies moving in orbits similar to that of YORP and this could be the result of mass shedding from the YORP effect.

== See also ==
- 1620 Geographos
- 1862 Apollo
- 25143 Itokawa
- 2017 DR109

== Notes ==
- This is assuming an albedo of 0.20–0.04.
