= 2006 JY26 =

Small risk–listed near-Earth asteroid

2006 JY_{26}
Discovery
- Discovered by: E. J. Christensen (Catalina Sky Survey)
- Discovery date: 6 May 2006

Designations
- Minor planet category: Apollo; NEO; Earth crosser

Orbital characteristics
- Epoch 21 November 2025 (JD 2461000.5)
- Uncertainty parameter 3
- Aphelion: 1.094242 AU (163.6963 Gm)
- Perihelion: 0.926201 AU (138.5577 Gm)
- Semi-major axis: 1.010221 AU (151.1269 Gm)
- Eccentricity: 0.083171
- Orbital period (sidereal): 1.02 yr (370.87 d)
- Mean anomaly: 8.90232°
- Mean motion: 0° 58^{m} 15.121^{s} / day
- Inclination: 1.43845°
- Longitude of ascending node: 43.4654°
- Argument of perihelion: 273.687°
- Jupiter MOID: 3.98114 AU (595.570 Gm)

Physical characteristics
- Dimensions: 6–13 m^{[a]}
- Absolute magnitude (H): 28.4

2006 JY_{26} is a very small near-Earth object orbiting in the inner Solar System. It is a horseshoe companion to the Earth like 3753 Cruithne.

== Discovery, orbit and physical properties ==
2006 JY_{26} was discovered by E. J. Christensen on 6 May 2006, observing for the Catalina Sky Survey. Its orbit is characterized by low eccentricity (0.083), low inclination (1.44º) and a semi-major axis of 1.01 AU. Upon discovery, it was classified as an Apollo asteroid but also an Earth crosser by the Minor Planet Center. The orbit is based on 76 observations spanning a data-arc of 4 days. 2006 JY_{26} has an absolute magnitude (H) of 28.4 which gives a characteristic diameter of about 9 meters.

=== Impact risk ===
Virtual impactors
Date	Impact probability (1 in)	JPL Horizons nominal geocentric distance (AU)	uncertainty region (3-sigma)
2073-05-03 09:36	330 thousand	0.025 AU (3.7 million km)	±2.4 million km
2074-05-03 00:43	210	0.0099 AU (1.48 million km)	±2.8 million km
2075-05-01 10:34	2.4 million	0.14 AU (21 million km)	±23 million km

It is listed on the Sentry Risk Table with a 1 in 210 chance of impacting Earth on 3 May 2074. The nominal best-fit orbit shows that 2006 JY_{26} will be 0.0099 AU (1,480,000 km; 920,000 mi) from Earth on 3 May 2074. An impact from this object would be less severe than the Chelyabinsk meteor.

== Horseshoe companion to the Earth and orbital evolution ==
Recent calculations indicate that it follows a horseshoe orbit with respect to the Earth. It had a close encounter with the Earth on 10 May 2006, at 0.0029 AU (430,000 km; 270,000 mi). Its orbital evolution is very chaotic and its orbit is difficult to predict beyond a few hundred years. Its orbit matches the expected properties of that of an object in the Arjuna-class.

== Origin ==
It may have been originated within the Venus–Earth–Mars region or in the main asteroid belt like other near-Earth objects, then transition to Amor-class asteroid before entering Earth's co-orbital region.

== See also ==
- 3753 Cruithne
- 2001 GO2
- 2002 AA29
- 2003 YN107
- 2009 SH2
- 2010 SO16
- 2012 FC71
- 2013 BS45

== Notes ==
- This is assuming an albedo of 0.20–0.04.
