= Cruithne =

Cruithne may refer to:

- Cruthin, also known as Cruithne, a people of early Ireland
- 3753 Cruithne, near-Earth asteroid
