= 2003 YN107 =

Near-Earth asteroid

2003 YN_{107}
Discovery
- Discovered by: LINEAR
- Discovery date: 20 December 2003

Designations
- Minor planet category: NEO; Aten

Orbital characteristics
- Epoch 21 November 2025 (JD 2461000.5)
- Uncertainty parameter 1
- Observation arc: 467 days (1.28 yr)
- Aphelion: 1.00263 AU (149.991 Gm)
- Perihelion: 0.975046 AU (145.8648 Gm)
- Semi-major axis: 0.988840 AU (147.9284 Gm)
- Eccentricity: 0.0139494
- Orbital period (sidereal): 0.98 yr (359.2 d)
- Average orbital speed: 29.82 km/s
- Mean anomaly: 186.0344°
- Mean motion: 1.00234°/day
- Inclination: 4.32089°
- Longitude of ascending node: 264.36698°
- Argument of perihelion: 87.55338°
- Earth MOID: 0.0048282 AU (722,290 km)

Physical characteristics
- Mean diameter: 10–30 m
- Absolute magnitude (H): 26.5

2003 YN_{107} is a tiny asteroid, classified as a near-Earth object of the Aten group moving in a 1:1 mean-motion resonance with Earth. Because of that, it is in a co-orbital configuration relative to Earth.

== Discovery, orbit and physical properties ==
2003 YN_{107} was discovered by the Lincoln Near Earth Asteroid Research (LINEAR) system in orbit around the Sun on 20 December 2003. Its diameter is approximately 10 to 30 metres. The object is on NASA's Earth Close Approach list, and is estimated to miss Earth by 0.01 AU. It revolves around the Sun on an Earth-like, almost circular, orbit. Its orbital period of 363.846 days also is very close to the sidereal year.

== Co-orbital with Earth and orbital evolution ==
From approximately 1997 to 2006, the asteroid remained within 0.1 AU (15,000,000 km; 9,300,000 mi) of Earth and it appeared to slowly orbit Earth. However, 2003 YN_{107} is no second moon, as it is not bound to Earth. It is the first discovered member of a postulated group of co-orbital objects, or quasi-satellites, which show these path characteristics. Other members of this group include 10563 Izhdubar, 54509 YORP, (66063) 1998 RO1, (85770) 1998 UP1, and (85990) 1999 JV_{6}. Before 1996, the asteroid had been on a so-called horseshoe orbit around the Sun, along the Earth's orbit. After 2006, it had regained such an orbit. This makes it very similar to 2002 AA29, which will become a quasi-satellite of Earth in approximately 600 years.

Animation of 2003 YN_{107} orbit from 1900-2100

Relative to Sun and Earth

Around Earth

Around Sun

Sun · Earth · 2003 YN_{107}

== See also ==
- Arjuna asteroid
- Natural satellite
- Quasi-satellite
- 3753 Cruithne
- 6Q0B44E
- 2001 GO2
- 2002 AA29
- 2006 JY26
- 2006 RH120
- 2009 SH2
- 2010 SO16
- 2012 FC71
- 2013 BS45
- 2016 HO3
