= 2340 Hathor =

Asteroid

Discovery
- Discovered by: C. Kowal
- Discovery site: Palomar Obs.
- Discovery date: 22 October 1976

Designations
- Pronunciation: /ˈhæθɔːr, -ər/
- Named after: Hathor (Egyptian deity)
- Alternative designations: 1976 UA
- Minor planet category: Aten · NEO · PHA

Orbital characteristics
- Epoch 11 August 2004 (JD 2453228.5)
- Uncertainty parameter 0
- Observation arc: 38.00 yr (13,878 days)
- Aphelion: 1.2235 AU
- Perihelion: 0.4642 AU
- Semi-major axis: 0.8438 AU
- Eccentricity: 0.4499
- Orbital period (sidereal): 0.78 yr (283 days)
- Mean anomaly: 42.104°
- Mean motion: 1° 16^{m} 17.4^{s} / day
- Inclination: 5.8546°
- Longitude of ascending node: 211.54°
- Argument of perihelion: 39.926°
- Earth MOID: 0.0069 AU · 2.7 LD

Physical characteristics
- Dimensions: 0.210±0.030 km 0.3 km (dated)
- Synodic rotation period: 3.350±0.002 h
- Geometric albedo: 0.15 (dated); 0.3331 (derived)
- Spectral type: CSU (Tholen); Sq (SMASS) · S B–V = 0.770; U–B = 0.500
- Absolute magnitude (H): 20.2

2340 Hathor (/ˈhæθɔːr, -ər/), provisional designation 1976 UA, is an eccentric stony asteroid, classified as a near-Earth object and potentially hazardous asteroid. It belongs to the Aten group of asteroids and measures approximately 210 meters in diameter. Discovered by Charles Kowal in 1976, it was later named after the ancient Egyptian goddess Hathor.

== Discovery ==
Hathor was discovered on 22 October 1976, by American astronomer Charles Kowal at Palomar Observatory, California, United States. It was independently discovered by Eleanor Helin and is named for the ancient Egyptian deity Hathor.

=== Independent discoveries ===
On 25 October 1976, Hathor was independently discovered by Eleanor Helin during the Palomar Planet-Crossing Asteroid Survey (PCAS), and by William Lawrence Sebok, who photographed the same field almost simultaneously using Palomar's 1.22-meter Schmidt telescope. On the same day, the official discoverer Charles Kowal found that Hathor had already been imaged three days earlier by Palomar's 0.46-meter telescope (the same instrument used by PCAS). A fourth independent discovery was made several days later by Nikolai Chernykh at CrAO on the Crimean peninsula.

The multiple discoveries were probably due to its very close approach distance to Earth. After 2062 Aten, Hathor was the second discovery of an Aten asteroid. In 1978, the third Aten, 2100 Ra-Shalom was discovered. The Aten 1954 XA was already identified at Palomar in 1954, but its discovery date was later assigned to a 2003 observation at Lincoln Laboratory ETS, and is now known as (363505) 2003 UC_{20}.

== Orbit and classification ==
Being a member of the Aten asteroids, Hathor orbits the Sun at a distance of 0.5–1.2 AU once every 0 years and 9 months (283 days). Its orbit has an eccentricity of 0.45 and an inclination of 6° with respect to the ecliptic. Its observation arc begins 3 days after its official discovery at Palomar, with no precoveries taken and no prior identifications made. Its orbital solution includes non-gravitational force (A2).

=== Close approaches ===
Hathor has an Earth Minimum orbit intersection distance of 0.0069 AU (1,030,000 km), which corresponds to 2.7 lunar distances (LD).

When it was discovered in 1976, Hathor had one of its closest approaches to Earth at 0.007752 AU (1,160,000 km). On 21 October 2014, when it passed Earth at 0.048 AU, or 18.8 LD, it was observed 22 times by the Goldstone Deep Space Network using radar astronomy over a period of 21 days from 10 to 31 October. It will pass Earth again at 0.00658 AU (984,000 km) on 21 October 2069.

== Physical characteristics ==
In the Tholen and SMASS taxonomy, Hathor has a CSU and Sq spectral type, respectively.

=== Diameter and albedo ===
In the 1990s, Dutch–American astronomer Tom Gehrels estimated Hathor's diameter to measure approximately 300 meters, assuming an albedo of 0.15. During its close approach to Earth in October 2014, a team of astronomer published a revised estimate of 210±30 meters for its diameter. The Collaborative Asteroid Lightcurve Link adopts this diameter and derives an albedo of 0.3331 with an absolute magnitude of 20.2.

=== Rotation period ===
In November 2014, American astronomer Brian Warner obtained a rotational lightcurve of Hathor from photometric observations taken at the Palmer Divide Station in Colorado (also see § External links). Light-curve analysis gave a well-defined rotation period of 3.350 hours with a brightness variation of 0.11 magnitude (U=3).

== Naming ==
In accordance with the custom to name all members of the Aten group after Ancient Egyptian deities, this minor planet is named for Hathor, sky-goddess and daughter of Ra, who personified the principles of joy, feminine love, and motherhood. The Ancient Greeks sometimes identified Hathor with the goddess Aphrodite. Naming was proposed by Eleanor Helin who also participated in the 1981 recovery. The minor planet 161 Athor is also named for Hathor. The official naming citation was published by the Minor Planet Center on 1 June 1981 (M.P.C. 6060).
