= 2009 SH2 =

Near-Earth asteroid

2009 SH_{2}
Discovery
- Discovered by: Siding Spring Survey
- Discovery site: Siding Spring Obs.
- Discovery date: 18 September 2009

Designations
- Minor planet category: Earth co-orbital · NEO; Aten

Orbital characteristics
- Epoch 21 November 2025 (JD 2461000.5)
- Uncertainty parameter 4
- Observation arc: 14 days
- Aphelion: 1.085 AU
- Perihelion: 0.8978 AU
- Semi-major axis: 0.991 AU
- Eccentricity: 0.09423
- Orbital period (sidereal): 0.99 yr (360.47 d)
- Mean anomaly: 30.7234°
- Mean motion: 0° 59^{m} 55.274^{s} / day
- Inclination: 6.810°
- Longitude of ascending node: 6.657°
- Time of perihelion: 21 October 2025 05:40 UT
- Argument of perihelion: 101.752°
- Earth MOID: 0.0002 AU (30,000 km)

Physical characteristics
- Mean diameter: 30–60 m (assumed albedo 0.05–0.25)
- Synodic rotation period: 1.26 h
- Apparent magnitude: 18.8 (at discovery)
- Absolute magnitude (H): 24.9

2009 SH_{2} is a sub-kilometer near-Earth asteroid of the Aten group, discovered by the Siding Spring Survey at Siding Spring Observatory, Australia on 18 September 2009. It is in a co-orbital configuration with Earth, a type of 1:1 orbital resonance where the asteroid appears to librate around Earth's path in a horseshoe orbit when viewed in a corotating reference frame with Earth. The co-orbital state of 2009 SH_{2} is only temporary as it has entered it about 30 years ago and will leave it in about 100 years into the future.

== Discovery ==
2009 SH_{2} was discovered by the Siding Spring Survey at Siding Spring Observatory, Coonabarabran, New South Wales, Australia on 18 September 2009. It was first observed in the constellation Fornax at an apparent magnitude of 18.8. The asteroid was moving at an on-sky rate around 2.5 arcseconds per minute, from a distance of 0.030 AU (4.5 million km; 2.8 million mi) from Earth. Follow-up observations of the asteroid were carried out by the Rio Cuarto Observatory (I20) on the following day. The asteroid was then confirmed by the Minor Planet Center and announced as 2009 SH_{2} on 19 September 2009.

== Orbit ==
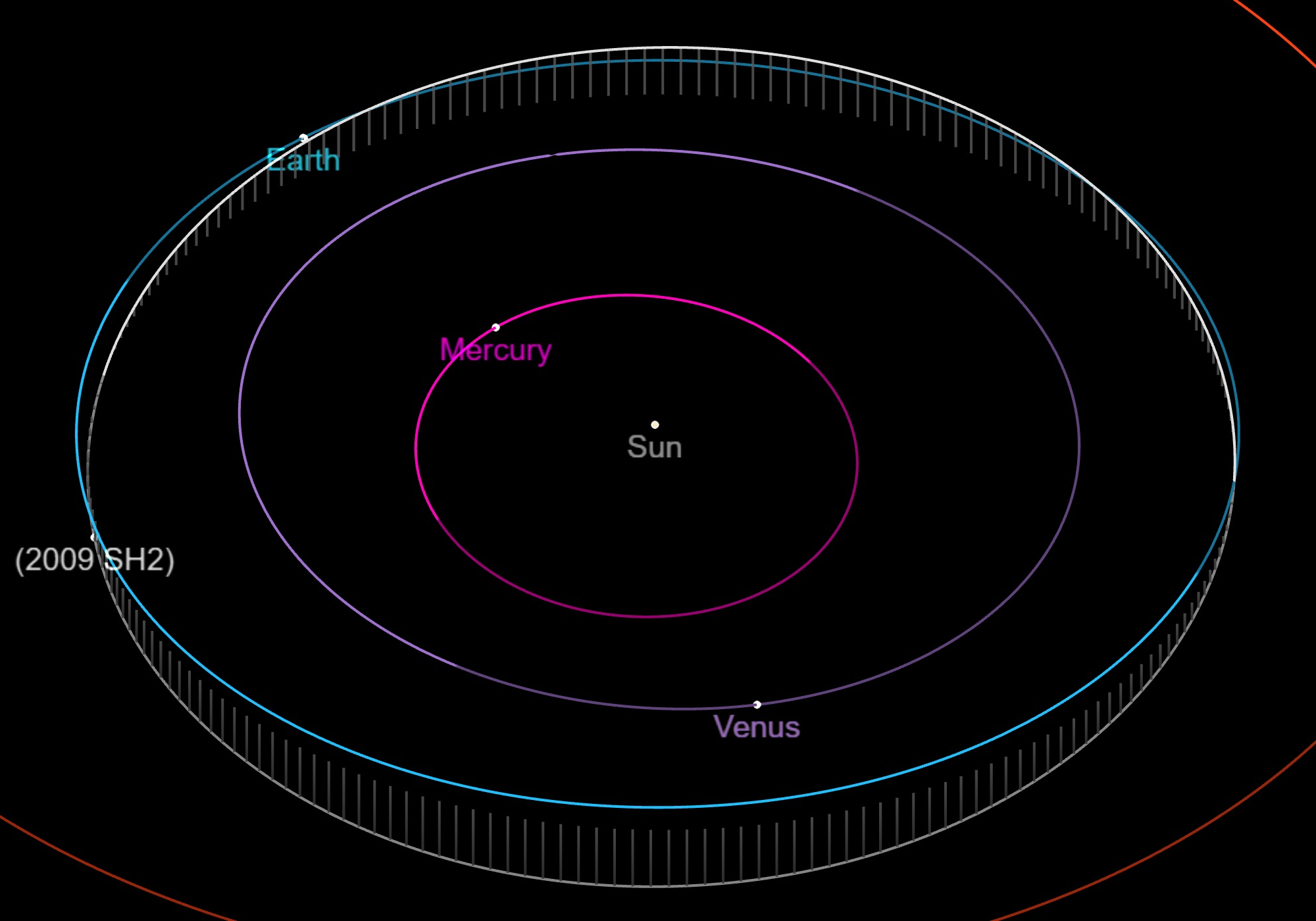
Orbit diagram of 2009 SH_{2} and the inner planets

2009 SH_{2} orbits the Sun at an average distance of 0.99 AU once every 360 days, or approximately 0.99 years. Its orbit has an eccentricity of 0.09 and an inclination of 7° with respect to the ecliptic plane. Over the course of its orbit, its distance from the Sun ranges from 0.90 AU at perihelion to 1.08 AU at aphelion, crossing the orbit of Earth. Since its orbit crosses that of Earth's while having a semi-major axis less than 1 AU, 2009 SH_{2} is classified as an Aten asteroid. Its nominal orbit has a small minimum orbit intersection distance approximately 0.0006 AU (90,000 km; 56,000 mi) from Earth's orbital path and periodically makes close approaches to Earth.

In 2013, astronomers Carlos and Raúl de la Fuente Marcos identified 2009 SH_{2} to be in a co-orbital configuration with Earth, a type of 1:1 orbital resonance where the asteroid appears to librate around Earth's path in a horseshoe orbit when viewed in a corotating reference frame with Earth. The co-orbital state of 2009 SH_{2} is only temporary as it has entered it about 30 years ago and will leave it in about 100 years into the future.

== Physical characteristics ==
Based on a magnitude-to-diameter conversion and a measured absolute magnitude of 24.9, 2009 SH_{2} measures between 30 and 60 meters in diameter for an assumed geometric albedo of 0.25 and 0.05, respectively. A rotation period of 1.26 h has been tentatively measured from its lightcurve.

== See also ==
- Arjuna asteroid
- 2003 YN107
- 2006 JY26
- 2012 FC71
- 2013 BS45
