= 2012 FC71 =

Asteroid

2012 FC_{71}
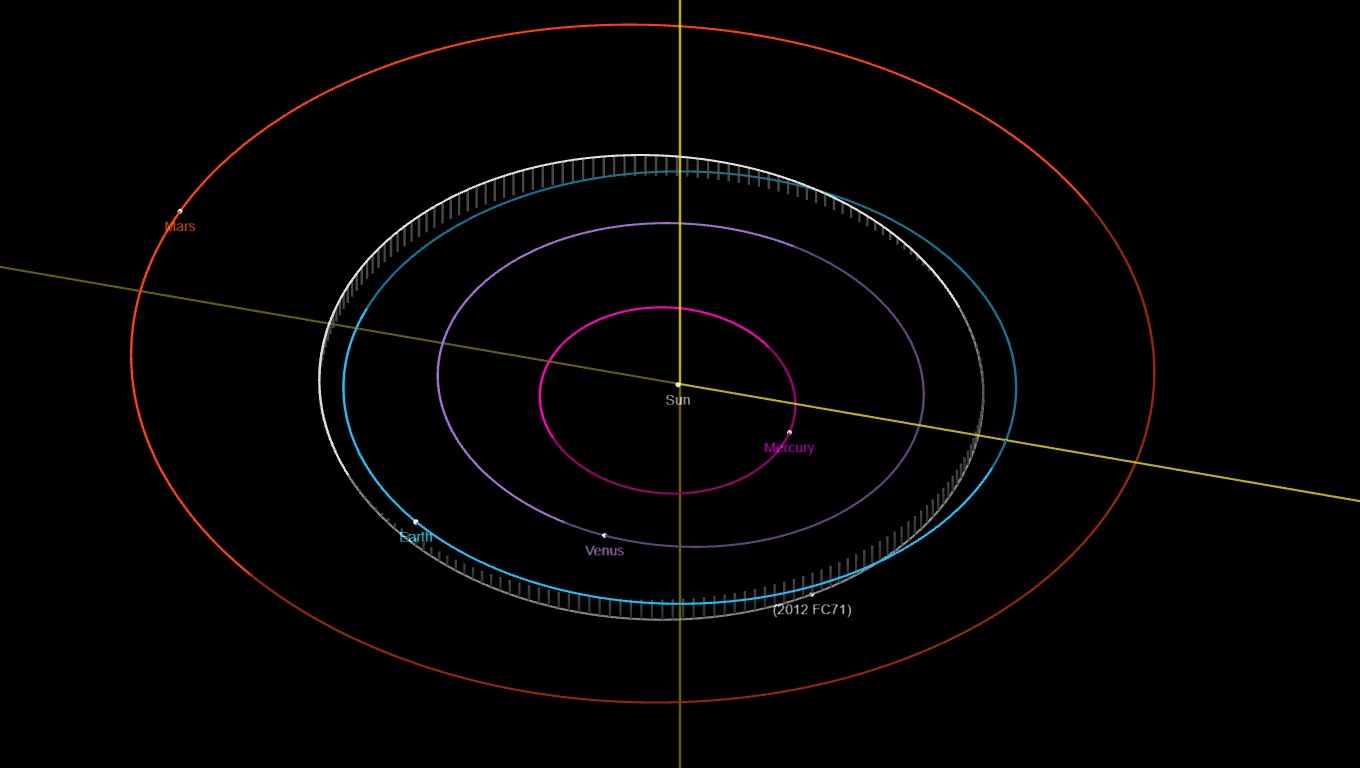

Discovery
- Discovered by: Mt. Lemmon Survey; A. Boattini (unofficial credits)
- Discovery date: 31 March 2012

Designations
- Minor planet category: NEO; Aten; Earth crosser

Orbital characteristics
- Epoch 16 February 2017 (JD 2457800.5)
- Uncertainty parameter: 5; 7
- Observation arc: 21 days
- Aphelion: 1.0750 AU
- Perihelion: 0.9008 AU
- Semi-major axis: 0.9879 AU
- Eccentricity: 0.0882
- Orbital period (sidereal): 0.98 yr (359 days)
- Mean anomaly: 150.11°
- Mean motion: 1° 0^{m} 13.68^{s} / day
- Inclination: 4.9430°
- Longitude of ascending node: 38.142°
- Argument of perihelion: 348.30°
- Earth MOID: 0.0566 AU (22.1 LD)

Physical characteristics
- Dimensions: 20–40 m^{[a]}
- Absolute magnitude (H): 25.2

2012 FC_{71} is a small asteroid trapped in a Kozai resonance with the Earth.

== Discovery, orbit and physical properties ==
It was first observed on 31 March 2012 by Andrea Boattini, observing for the Mt. Lemmon Survey. Its orbit is characterized by low eccentricity (0.088), low inclination (4.97º) and a semi-major axis of 0.9895 AU. It is an Aten asteroid but also an Earth crosser. As of 21 April 2012 its orbit is based on 35 observations spanning a data-arc of 21 days. This short observation arc results in an orbit uncertainty of 7. It has not been seen since and is unlikely to be seen again for several decades. It will remain both very dim (around apparent magnitude 27), and close in the sky to the Sun (solar elongation of less than 90 degrees), making it impossible to observe with current ground based telescopes till the 2060s. A number of times during the decade it will again be visible in the night sky and at times be brighter than apparent magnitude 21, as when it was first observed.

== Kozai resonator and future orbital evolution ==
2012 FC_{71} is locked in a Kozai resonance and as such it has a very slow orbital evolution and it will remain relatively unperturbed for hundreds of thousands of years. It had a close encounter with the Earth on 18 April 2012 at 0.076 AU when it was discovered and another on 17 May 2013 at 0.0581 AU, which was not observed.

== Origin ==
It may have been originated within the Venus-Earth-Mars region or in the main asteroid belt like other Near-Earth Objects, then transitioned to an Amor-class asteroid before entering Earth's co-orbital region.

== See also ==
- 3753 Cruithne
- 2001 GO2
- 2002 AA29
- 2003 YN107
- 2006 JY26
- 2009 SH2
- 2010 SO16
- 2013 BS45

== Notes ==
- This is assuming an albedo of 0.20–0.04.
