= SO16 =

SO16 may refer to:

- The Diplomatic Protection Group, a Specialist Operations branch of London's Metropolitan Police Service
- 2010 SO16, a near-Earth asteroid
- (29459) 1997 SO16, main-belt minor planet
