= Sekhmet (disambiguation) =

Sekhmet is an Egyptian goddess.

Sekhmet may also refer to:

- 5381 Sekhmet, an asteroid
- Sekhmet (Re:Zero), a character in the light novel series Re:Zero − Starting Life in Another World
- Sekhmet (Ronin Warriors), a character from the Japanese anime series
- Sekhmet (Marvel Comics)
- Sekhmet, one of the 17 Titans in the film, Godzilla: King of the Monsters.
- A Vasudan heavy bomber in the game Freespace 2
- Sekhmet, a Pal in the video game Palworld.
