= 2017 DR109 =

Micro-asteroid classified as a near-Earth object of the Apollo group and Aten group

2017 DR_{109}
Discovery
- Discovered by: Catalina Sky Srvy.
- Discovery site: Mount Lemmon Obs.
- Discovery date: 27 February 2017

Designations
- Minor planet category: NEO · Apollo · Aten

Orbital characteristics
- Epoch 4 September 2017 (JD 2458000.5)
- Uncertainty parameter 6
- Observation arc: (5 days)
- Aphelion: 1.2422 AU
- Perihelion: 0.7591 AU
- Semi-major axis: 1.0006 AU
- Eccentricity: 0.2414
- Orbital period (sidereal): 1.00 yr (366 days)
- Mean anomaly: 263.04°
- Mean motion: 0° 59^{m} 4.92^{s} / day
- Inclination: 3.0600°
- Longitude of ascending node: 341.31°
- Argument of perihelion: 72.094°
- Earth MOID: 0.0062 AU (2.4 LD)

Physical characteristics
- Mean diameter: 9–20 m (estimate)^{[a]}
- Absolute magnitude (H): 27.6

2017 DR_{109} is a micro-asteroid, classified as a near-Earth object of the Apollo group and Aten group, respectively. It is currently trapped in a 1:1 mean motion resonance with the Earth of the horseshoe type. The object was first observed on 27 February 2017, by astronomers of the Catalina Sky Survey conducted at Mount Lemmon Observatory, Arizona, United States.

== Discovery ==
2017 DR_{109} was first observed by astronomer D. C. Fuls on 27 February 2017, using the 0.68-meter Schmidt camera of the Catalina Sky Survey at a visual apparent magnitude of 19.6.

== Orbit and physical properties ==
The asteroid's orbit has still a high uncertainty; with a very short observation arc of just 5 days. It orbits the Sun at a distance of 0.76–1.24 AU once every 366 days (semi-major axis of 1.00 AU). Its orbit has an eccentricity of 0.24 and an inclination of 3° with respect to the ecliptic. With a semi-major axis of that of Earth, the object is both classified as a member of Apollo and Aten in the JPL Small-Body Database and by the Minor Planet Center, respectively. Both Apollo and Aten asteroids are Earth-crossing asteroids.

=== Earth co-orbital ===
2017 DR_{109} is currently trapped in a 1:1 mean motion resonance with the Earth of the horseshoe type and follows an orbit similar to those of 54509 YORP, 2017 FZ2 and several other near-Earth asteroids.

== Physical characteristics ==
2017 DR_{109} has an absolute magnitude of 27.6 which gives a calculated mean diameter between 9 and 20 meters for an assumed geometric albedo of 0.20 and 0.04, respectively, which are typical values for stony S-type and carbonaceous C-type asteroids.

== Notes ==
- This is assuming an albedo of 0.20 and 0.04, respectively.
