= Arjuna asteroid =

Class of near-Earth asteroids

The Arjuna asteroids (also known as "Arjunas") are a dynamical group of asteroids in the Solar System. Arjunas are near-Earth objects (NEOs) whose orbits are very Earth-like in character, having low inclination, orbital periods close to one year, and low eccentricity. The group is named after Arjuna, a central hero in the Mahabharata. The definition overlaps the definition of the Apollo, Amor, Aten and Atira groups. They constitute a dynamically cold group of small NEOs that experience repeated trappings in the 1:1 mean-motion resonance with the Earth.

== Members ==
Potential members of the Arjuna group with their Apollo (APO) or Aten (ATE) group classification in parentheses, include:

- 1991 VG (APO)
- 2003 YN107 (ATE)
- 2006 JY26 (APO)
- 2009 SH2 (ATE)
- 2013 BS45 (ATE)
- 2024 PT5 (APO)
- 2025 PN_{7} (APO)
