= 2015 XF261 =

Near-Earth asteroid

2015 XF_{261}
Discovery
- Discovery date: 8 December 2015 (Initial reported obs.)

Designations
- Minor planet category: NEO; Aten

Orbital characteristics
- Epoch 21 November 2025 (JD 2461000.5)
- Uncertainty parameter 1
- Observation arc: 2,991 days
- Aphelion: 1.306 AU
- Perihelion: 0.674 AU
- Semi-major axis: 0.990 AU
- Eccentricity: 0.319
- Orbital period (sidereal): 0.985 years
- Mean anomaly: 126.230°
- Mean motion: 1.001°/day
- Inclination: 0.794°
- Longitude of ascending node: 209.818°
- Argument of perihelion: 100.882°
- Earth MOID: 0.00244 AU
- Jupiter MOID: 3.928 AU

Physical characteristics
- Mean diameter: 16 meters
- Absolute magnitude (H): 25.25

2015 XF_{261} is an Aten-type near-Earth asteroid with an estimated diameter of around 16 m (52 ft). It completes one orbit around the Sun every 359.7 days, placing it near the 1:1 mean-motion resonance with Earth.

== Orbit ==
2015 XF_{261} is a near-Earth asteroid following an elliptical orbit around the Sun, with a semi-major axis of 0.99 astronomical units (AU), an orbital period of about 359.7 days, and an orbital inclination of 0.79°. Due to an orbital eccentricity of 0.32, its distance from the Sun varies from 0.67 AU at perihelion to 1.31 AU at aphelion. Since it is an Earth-crossing asteroid with a semi-major axis under 1 AU, it is classified as an Aten asteroid. Its orbital period nearly matches with Earth's, placing it in a near-1:1 mean-motion resonance with Earth.

== Proposed exploration ==
2015 XF_{261} was a proposed target for an asteroid-deflecting mission planned by China in 2029, launching in 2027, two years after its previous launch target of 2025. Its original target was 2019 VL5. The target was later changed to 2016 WP8.

== See also ==
- Double Asteroid Redirection Test (DART), another asteroid-deflecting mission which collided with Dimorphos
