= 2001 GO2 =

Near-Earth asteroid

2001 GO_{2}
Discovery
- Discovered by: LINEAR
- Discovery site: Lincoln Lab ETS
- Discovery date: 13 April 2001 (first observed only)

Designations
- Minor planet category: Apollo · NEO

Orbital characteristics
- Epoch 21 November 2025 (JD 2461000.5)
- Uncertainty parameter 7
- Observation arc: 4 days
- Aphelion: 1.1761 AU
- Perihelion: 0.8372 AU
- Semi-major axis: 1.0066 AU
- Eccentricity: 0.1683
- Orbital period (sidereal): 1.01 yr (369 d)
- Mean anomaly: 218.43°
- Mean motion: 0° 58^{m} 33.24^{s} / day
- Inclination: 4.6243°
- Longitude of ascending node: 193.50°
- Argument of perihelion: 265.56°
- Earth MOID: 0.0047 AU (1.8 LD)

Physical characteristics
- Mean diameter: 37 m (est. at 0.25); 49 m (est. at 0.14); 77 m (est. at 0.057)
- Absolute magnitude (H): 24.3

2001 GO_{2} is a very small asteroid and near-Earth object of the Apollo group, approximately 50 meters (160 feet) in diameter. Like 2003 YN_{107}, it is in a co-orbital configuration relative to Earth moving in a 1:1 mean-motion resonance. It was first observed on 13 April 2001, by astronomers with the LINEAR program at the Lincoln Lab's ETS near Socorro, New Mexico, in the United States. 2001 GO_{2} has not been observed since its short four-day observation period in April 2001.

== Description ==
With an orbital period of 369 days, 2001 GO_{2} is in a near 1:1 orbital resonance with Earth, and also has about the same orbit around the Sun as Earth. Unlike most near-Earth asteroids that simply fly by when they approach Earth, the Earth catches up with this asteroid from behind so that the asteroid then pauses in the vicinity of Earth. While in the vicinity of Earth, the asteroid moves in a helical (corkscrew) pattern that resembles an orbit around the Earth, like the Earth has a new moon. But it is not really a moon, because the asteroid is not gravitationally bound to the Earth, and eventually the asteroid moves on away from Earth and continues its orbit around the Sun. 2001 GO_{2} was in this helical pattern from about 1997 to 2005, making the closest approach to Earth on 6 April 2001, and will not make another close approach until 2092.

The asteroid probably has a horseshoe orbit, but this has not been proven because the orbit was determined from only 5 days worth of observation. The Jupiter Tisserand invariant, used to distinguish different kinds of orbits, is 6.033.

Other asteroids that move in this helical pattern, some of which the Earth catches up with the asteroid, and others in which the asteroid catches up with Earth, are 2003 YN107, 2002 AA29, and 164207 Cardea.

Animation of 2001 GO_{2} orbit from 1600 to 2500

Relative to Sun and Earth

Around Earth

Around Sun

Sun · Earth · 2001 GO_{2}

== See also ==
- 3753 Cruithne (1986 TO)
- 2002 AA29
- 2003 YN107
- 2006 JY26
- 2010 SO16
- 2012 FC71
- Orbital resonance
