= 2019 VL5 =

Near-Earth asteroid

2019 VL_{5}
Discovery
- Discovered by: LINEAR
- Discovery date: 9 November 2019

Designations
- Minor planet category: NEO; Aten

Orbital characteristics
- Epoch 17 October 2024 (JD 2460600.5)
- Uncertainty parameter 0
- Observation arc: 1827 days (5.00 years)
- Aphelion: 1.277788 AU (191.1544 Gm)
- Perihelion: 0.720270 AU (107.7509 Gm)
- Semi-major axis: 0.999029 AU (149.4526 Gm)
- Eccentricity: 0.279030
- Orbital period (sidereal): 0.9986 yr (364.72 d)
- Mean anomaly: 260.08477°
- Mean motion: 0.98705°/day
- Inclination: 1.73671°
- Longitude of ascending node: 279.28599°
- Argument of perihelion: 237.69006°
- Earth MOID: 0.00700361 AU (1,047,725 km)

Physical characteristics
- Mean diameter: 30 m
- Absolute magnitude (H): 25.86

2019 VL_{5} is a tiny asteroid, classified as a near-Earth object of the Aten group moving in a 1:1 mean-motion resonance with Earth. Because of that, it is in a co-orbital configuration relative to Earth. 2019 VL_{5} is currently in a horseshoe orbit: relative to the Sun and Earth, it moves back and forth in a horseshoe shape around Earth's orbit, with Earth in the gap of the horseshoe. According to orbital calculations, the asteroid was an Earth co-orbital for at least 500 years and will stay one for at least another 2,500 years. During this time, it will remain in this horseshoe orbit for at least 800 years, then it will transfer to a quasi-satellite orbit, then back to a horseshoe orbit after a few decades.

China planned to launch an asteroid deflection probe targeting 2019 VL_{5} in 2025, but later changed the target to 2015 XF261, and then 2016 WP8.
