= Insignia trilogy =

Series of three young-adult science fiction novels by S.J. Kincaid

- Book covers of the Insignia trilogy
- Insignia; Vortex; Catalyst
- Author: S.J. Kincaid
- Country: United States
- Language: English
- Genre: Young adult, Sci-Fi, Fantasy
- Publisher: Katherine Tegen Books (an Imprint of Harper Collins)
- Published: 2012 – 2014
- Media type: Print
- No. of books: 3
- Website: http://sjkincaid.com/

The Insignia trilogy is a series of three young-adult science fiction novels written by S.J. Kincaid and published by Katherine Tegen Books. The novels describe a dystopian future where the world is experiencing World War III. Teenager Tom Raines is recruited to train with other recruits as a crucial member of the Intrasolar Forces and, during the Pentagonal Spire's training academy, becomes friends with Wyatt Enslow, Vik Ashwan, and Yuri Sysevich. The trilogy is preceded by the novella Allies.

== Reception ==
Insignia made the short-list for the 2014 Waterstones Children's Book Prize and won the 2015 Young Adult Alabama Author Award from the Alabama Library Association.

The book was a Junior Library Guild selection, a selection for the 2013 YALSA Best Fiction for Young Adults List, a selection for the Summer 2012 Indie Next List, and a selection for the Texas Lone Star Reading List.
