= 2100 Ra-Shalom =

Near-Earth asteroid

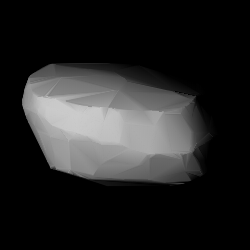
- Shape model of Ra-Shalom from its lightcurve

Discovery
- Discovered by: E. F. Helin
- Discovery site: Palomar Obs.
- Discovery date: 10 September 1978

Designations
- Pronunciation: /ˌrɑː ʃəˈloʊm/
- Named after: Ra and Shalom (composed name)
- Alternative designations: 1978 RA · 1975 TB
- Minor planet category: NEO · Aten

Orbital characteristics
- Epoch 7 November 2005 (JD 2453681.5)
- Uncertainty parameter 0
- Observation arc: 41.07 yr (14,999 days)
- Aphelion: 1.1952 AU
- Perihelion: 0.4688 AU
- Semi-major axis: 0.8320 AU
- Eccentricity: 0.4365
- Orbital period (sidereal): 0.76 yr (277 days)
- Mean anomaly: 104.56°
- Inclination: 15.756°
- Longitude of ascending node: 170.88°
- Argument of perihelion: 355.98°
- Earth MOID: 0.1496 AU · 58.3 LD

Physical characteristics
- Mean diameter: 1.98±0.05 km 2.04 km 2.22 km 2.24 km 2.3±0.2 km 2.48 km 2.78 km 2.79 km
- Synodic rotation period: 19.79±0.03 h 19.793±0.001 h 19.797 h (Note: Pravec (2003) web: rotation period 19.797 hours with a brightness amplitude of 0.34 in magnitude. Period Identical with Pravec's observation in 1998. Summary figures at Collaborative Asteroid Lightcurve Link (CALL) for (2100) Ra-Shalom); 19.79981 h 19.8201±0.00004 h 19.89±0.05
- Geometric albedo: 0.080; 0.082; 0.125; 0.13±0.03; 0.14±0.10; 0.16; 0.177±0.009
- Spectral type: C (Tholen) · Xc (SMASS); C (CALL) · K B–V = 0.712; U–B = 0.310
- Absolute magnitude (H): 15.66±0.1 (R) · 15.90 · 16.05 · 16.054±0.07 · 16.06±0.07 · 16.06 · 16.07 · 16.1 · 16.11

2100 Ra-Shalom (prov. designation: 1978 RA) is an asteroid and near-Earth object of the Aten group on an eccentric orbit in the inner Solar System. It was discovered on 10 September 1978, by American astronomer Eleanor Helin at the Palomar Observatory, California, who named it in commemoration of the Camp David Peace Accords. The C-type asteroid (Xc, K) has a rotation period of 19.8 hours and measures approximately 2.7 kilometers (1.7 miles) in diameter.

== Orbit and classification ==
Ra-Shalom orbits the Sun at a distance of 0.5–1.2 astronomical units (75–180 million kilometres) once every 9 months (277 days). Its orbit has an eccentricity of 0.44 and an inclination of 16° with respect to the ecliptic.

It was the second Aten asteroid to be discovered after 2062 Aten, the family's namesake, also discovered by Helin in 1976. The group of Aten asteroids feature a semi-major axis of less than 1 au. Of this group, Ra-Shalom has one of the smallest semi-major axes, just 0.832 au.

The asteroid has an Earth minimum orbital intersection distance of 0.1496 AU (22.4 million kilometres) which corresponds to 58.3 lunar distances, far too large to make it a potentially hazardous object. It also comes within 30 million kilometres (0.2 AU) of Mars, Venus and Mercury. The closest approaches are to Mercury, to about 0.0784 astronomical units (11.7 million kilometres).

== Naming ==
The minor planet's composed named was chosen by the discoverer to commemorate the Camp David Peace Accords between Egypt and Israel in September 1978, and as a symbol for the universal hope for peace. Ra is the Egyptian Sun-god, who symbolizes enlightenment and life, while Shalom is the traditional Hebrew greeting meaning peace. The official naming citation was published by the Minor Planet Center on 1 November 1978 (M.P.C. 4548).

== Physical characteristics ==
Ra-Shalom has been characterized as a C-type and X-type asteroid on the Tholen and SMASS taxonomic scheme, respectively. It has also been characterized as a K-type asteroid. In 1981, the asteroid was detected using radar, revealing a relatively smooth surface at decimeter scales.

=== Rotation period ===
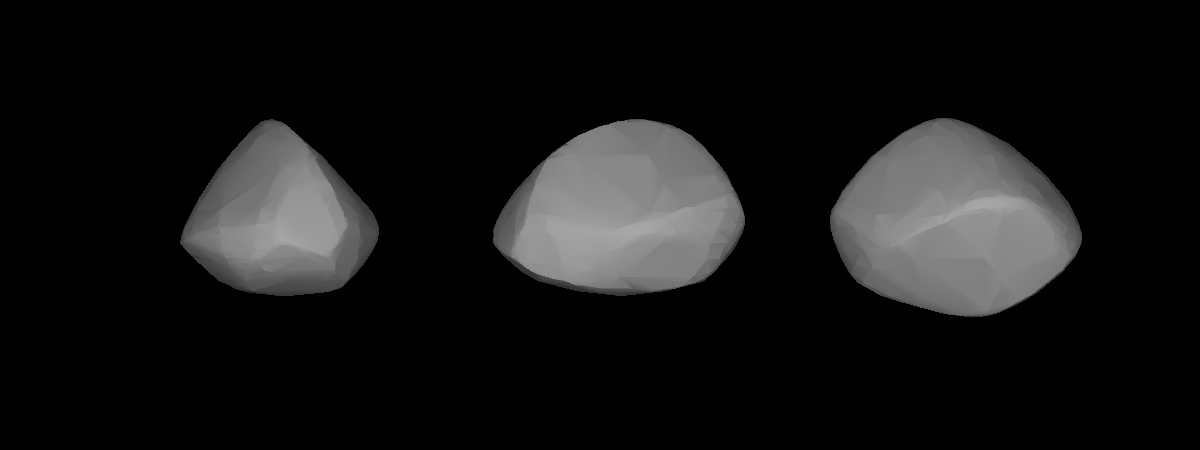
Lightcurve based 3D-model of Ra-Shalom

In August 2016, a rotational lightcurve of Ra-Shalom was obtained from photometric observations by American astronomer Brian Warner. Lightcurve analysis gave a well-defined rotation period of 19.89 hours with a brightness amplitude of 0.55 magnitude (U=3).

A large number of previous photometric observations gave a period between 19.79 and 19.8201 hours with a brightness amplitude between 0.3 and 0.41 magnitude.

=== Diameter and albedo ===
According to Spitzer Space Telescope's ExploreNEOs survey, the Japanese Akari satellite, and NASA's Keck Observatory, Ra-Shalom measures between 1.98 and 2.79 kilometers in diameter and its surface has an albedo between 0.080 and 0.177. The Collaborative Asteroid Lightcurve Link adopts an albedo of 0.082 and a diameter of 2.78 kilometers with an absolute magnitude of 16.054.
