= 5381 Sekhmet =

Asteroid

Discovery
- Discovered by: C. S. Shoemaker
- Discovery site: Palomar Obs.
- Discovery date: 14 May 1991

Designations
- Pronunciation: /ˈsɛkmɛt/
- Named after: Sekhmet (Egyptian mythology)
- Alternative designations: 1991 JY
- Minor planet category: Aten · NEO

Orbital characteristics
- Epoch 27 June 2015 (JD 2457200.5)
- Uncertainty parameter 0
- Observation arc: 24.00 yr (8,765 days)
- Aphelion: 1.2281 AU
- Perihelion: 0.6667 AU
- Semi-major axis: 0.9474 AU
- Eccentricity: 0.2962
- Orbital period (sidereal): 0.92 yr (337 days)
- Mean anomaly: 165.44°
- Inclination: 48.968°
- Longitude of ascending node: 58.546°
- Argument of perihelion: 37.429°
- Earth MOID: 0.1123 AU

Physical characteristics
- Mean diameter: 1.42 km
- Synodic rotation period: 2.8233 h
- Spectral type: S
- Absolute magnitude (H): 16.6

5381 Sekhmet is an Aten asteroid whose orbit is sometimes closer to the Sun than the Earth's. Carolyn Shoemaker at Palomar Observatory discovered it on 14 May 1991. It is named after Sekhmet, the Egyptian goddess of war.

Sekhmet is believed to be an S-type asteroid, and some believe its diameter is approximately 1.4 km.

In December 2003, a team of astronomers at Arecibo Observatory announced that the asteroid may have a moon that measures 300 m in diameter and orbits approximately 1.5 km from Sekhmet. This moon is not yet confirmed.
