= 2015 SO2 =

Aten asteroid in a horseshoe orbit co-orbital with Earth

2015 SO_{2}
Discovery
- Discovered by: Črni Vrh Obs.
- Discovery date: 21 September 2015

Designations
- Minor planet category: NEO; Aten; Earth crosser

Orbital characteristics
- Epoch 31 July 2016 (JD 2457600.5)
- Uncertainty parameter 1
- Observation arc: 342 days
- Aphelion: 1.10688036 AU (165.586945 Gm)
- Perihelion: 0.890962 AU (133.2860 Gm)
- Semi-major axis: 0.99892124 AU (149.436491 Gm)
- Eccentricity: 0.108076
- Orbital period (sidereal): 1.00 yr (364.66602 d)
- Mean anomaly: 208.3767°
- Mean motion: 0° 59^{m} 13.937^{s} / day
- Inclination: 9.1750°
- Longitude of ascending node: 182.9293°
- Argument of perihelion: 290.0678°
- Earth MOID: 0.0191611 AU (2.86646 Gm)

Physical characteristics
- Mean diameter: 50–111 m^{[a]}
- Absolute magnitude (H): 23.9

2015 SO_{2} is an Aten asteroid that is a temporary horseshoe companion to the Earth, the ninth known Earth horseshoe librator. Prior to its most recent close encounter with the planet (2015 September 30) it was an Apollo asteroid.

== Discovery ==
2015 SO_{2} was discovered on 21 September 2015 by B. Mikuž observing with the 0.6-m f/3.3 Cichocki telescope at the Črni Vrh Observatory in Slovenia. As of 30 November 2015, it has been observed 84 times with an observation arc of 9 days.

== Orbit and orbital evolution ==
2015 SO_{2} is currently an Aten asteroid (Earth-crossing but with a period less than a year). Its semi-major axis (currently 0.999115 AU) is similar to that of Earth (0.99957 AU), but it has a relatively low eccentricity (0.108105) and moderate orbital inclination (9.181°). Gravitational interaction with Earth causes its orbit to change so that its average period is one year. It alternates between being an Aten asteroid and being an Apollo asteroid, changing dynamical status every 113 years approximately. As of 30 November 2015, this object is the 14th known Earth co-orbital and the 9th known object following a horseshoe path with respect to our planet. Its orbital evolution is characterized by alternating horseshoe and quasi-satellite episodes.

== Physical properties ==
With an absolute magnitude of 23.9, it has a diameter in the range of 50–111 meters (for an assumed albedo range of 0.04–0.20, respectively).

Animation of 2015 SO_{2}'s orbit from 1600 to 2500

Relative to Sun and Earth

Around Earth

Around Sun

Sun · Earth · 2015 SO_{2}

== See also ==
- 54509 YORP
- (419624) 2010 SO16
- 3753 Cruithne

== Notes ==
- This is assuming an albedo of 0.20–0.04.
