= 2002 AA29 =

Near-Earth asteroid

2002 AA_{29}
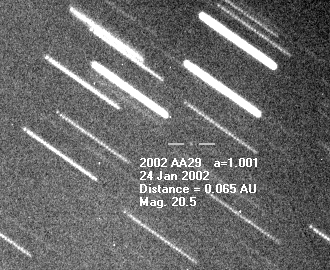

Discovery
- Discovered by: LINEAR
- Discovery date: January 9, 2002

Designations
- Alternative designations: none
- Minor planet category: Aten asteroid

Orbital characteristics
- Epoch 21 November 2025 (JD 2461000.5)
- Uncertainty parameter 0
- Observation arc: 736 days (2.02 yr)
- Aphelion: 1.0055 AU (150.42 Gm)
- Perihelion: 0.97970 AU (146.561 Gm)
- Semi-major axis: 0.99262 AU (148.494 Gm)
- Eccentricity: 0.013018
- Orbital period (sidereal): 0.99 yr (361.2 d)
- Average orbital speed: 29.784 km/s
- Mean anomaly: 298.57°
- Mean motion: 0° 59^{m} 47.832^{s} /day
- Inclination: 10.748°
- Longitude of ascending node: 106.35°
- Argument of perihelion: 101.77°
- Earth MOID: 0.0114567 AU (1.71390 Gm)
- Jupiter MOID: 3.96777 AU (593.570 Gm)

Physical characteristics
- Dimensions: ~0.06 km <100 metres 25±5 metres
- Mass: ~2.3×10^{8} kg
- Mean density: 2 ? g/cm^{3}
- Equatorial surface gravity: ~0.000 017 m/s^{2}
- Equatorial escape velocity: ~0.000 032 km/s
- Synodic rotation period: 0.55 h (33 min)
- Geometric albedo: 0.2 ?
- Temperature: ~279 K
- Spectral type: S-type asteroid
- Absolute magnitude (H): 24.1

2002 AA_{29} is a small near-Earth asteroid that was discovered on January 9, 2002 by the LINEAR (Lincoln Near Earth Asteroid Research) automatic sky survey. The diameter of the asteroid is only about 20–100 metres (70–300 ft). It revolves about the Sun on an almost circular orbit very similar to that of the Earth. This lies for the most part inside the Earth's orbit, which it crosses near the asteroid's furthest point from the Sun, the aphelion. Because of this orbit, the asteroid is classified as Aten type, named after the asteroid 2062 Aten.

A further characteristic is that its mean orbital period about the Sun is exactly one sidereal year. This means that it is locked into a relationship with the Earth, since such an orbit is only stable under particular conditions. As yet only a few asteroids of this sort are known, locked into a 1:1 resonance with the Earth. The first was 3753 Cruithne, discovered in 1986.

Asteroids that have a 1:1 orbital resonance with a planet are also called co-orbital objects, because they follow the orbit of the planet. The most numerous known co-orbital asteroids are the so-called trojans, which occupy the L4 and L5 Lagrangian points of the relevant planet. However, 2002 AA_{29} does not belong to these. Instead, it follows a so-called horseshoe orbit along the path of the Earth.

== Orbit ==
=== Orbital data ===
Shortly after the discovery by LINEAR, Scientists at the Jet Propulsion Laboratory (JPL), the Athabasca University (Canada), the Queen's University in Kingston (Ontario, Canada), the York University in Toronto and the Tuorla Observatory of the University of Turku in Finland determined the unusual orbit of 2002 AA_{29}, and through further observations at the Canada–France–Hawaii Telescope in Hawaii it was confirmed that:

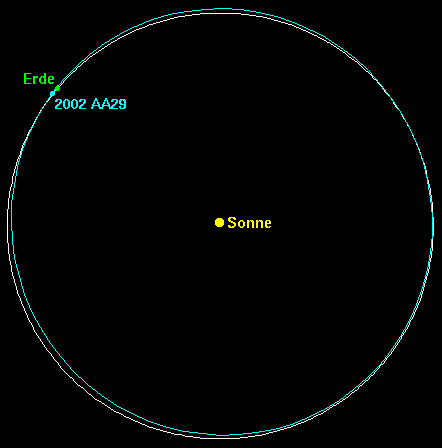
Orbits of 2002 AA_{29} and Earth about the Sun, looking down on the ecliptic plane from above the Sun's North Pole; Image: JPL

- Its orbit lies for the most part inside Earth's orbit. The orbits of most asteroids lie in the asteroid belt between Mars and Jupiter. Through orbital disturbances by the gas giant planets, mainly Jupiter and the Kirkwood gaps, and through the Yarkovsky effect (force due to asymmetrical absorption and emission of infrared radiation) asteroids are diverted into the inner Solar System, where their orbits are further influenced by close approaches with the inner planets. 2002 AA_{29} has probably been brought in the same way from the outer Solar System into Earth's influence. However, it is also suggested that the asteroid has always been on a near-Earth orbit and thus that it or a precursor body was formed near Earth's orbit. In this case one possibility is that it could be a fragment from a collision of a middle-sized asteroid with Earth or the Moon.
- Its mean orbital period is one sidereal year. After it was diverted into the inner Solar System – or formed on a path near Earth's orbit – the asteroid must have been moved into an orbit corresponding with Earth. In this orbit it was repeatedly pulled by Earth in such a way that its own orbital period became the same as that of Earth. In the current orbit, Earth thus holds the asteroid in synchronicity with its own orbit.

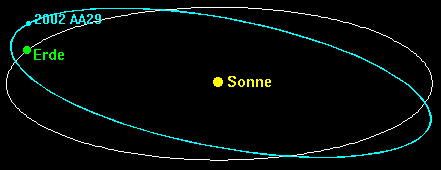
Orbits of 2002 AA_{29} and Earth about the Sun, seen from the side; Image: JPL

- The orbit of the asteroid is almost circular, with an eccentricity of 0.012 which is even lower than that of the Earth at 0.0167. The other near-Earth asteroids have on average a significantly higher eccentricity of 0.29. Also, all other asteroids in 1:1 resonance with Earth known before 2002 have very strongly elliptical orbits – e.g. the eccentricity of (3753) Cruithne is 0.515. At the time of its discovery the orbit of 2002 AA_{29} was unique, because of which the asteroid is often called the first true co-orbital companion of Earth, since the paths of previously discovered asteroids are not very similar to Earth's orbit. The very low orbital eccentricity of 2002 AA_{29} is also an indication that it must always have been on a near-Earth orbit, or the Yarkovsky effect must have comparatively strongly caused it to spiral into the inner Solar System over billions of years, since as a rule asteroids which have been steered by planets have orbits with higher eccentricity.
- The orbital inclination with respect to the ecliptic (orbital plane of Earth) of 2002 AA_{29} is a moderate 10.739°. Hence its orbit is slightly tilted compared with that of Earth.

=== Shape of the orbit ===
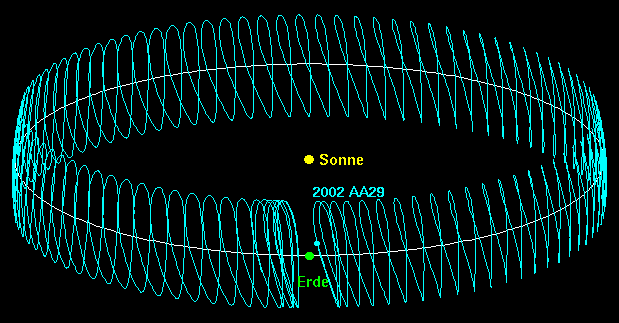
Horseshoe orbit of 2002 AA_{29}. The graphic shows a full revolution of 95 years. The position of 2002 AA_{29} along the orbit is that of year 2003 (last nearest approach to Earth). Image: JPL

If one looks at the orbit of 2002 AA_{29} from a point moving with the Earth around the Sun (the reference frame of the Earth–Sun system), it describes over the course of 95 years an arc of almost 360°, which during the next 95 years it retraces in reverse. The shape of this arc is reminiscent of a horseshoe, from which comes the name "horseshoe orbit". As it moves along the Earth's orbit, it winds in a spiral about it, in which each loop of the spiral takes one year. This spiral motion (in the Earth–Sun reference frame) arises from the slightly lower eccentricity and the tilt of the orbit: the inclination relative to the Earth's orbit is responsible for the vertical component of the spiral loop, and the difference in eccentricity for the horizontal component.

When 2002 AA_{29} is approaching the Earth from in front (i.e. it is moving slightly slower, and the Earth is catching it up), the gravitational attraction of the Earth shifts it onto a slightly faster orbit, a little nearer the Sun. It now hurries ahead of the Earth along its new orbit, until after 95 years it has almost lapped the Earth and is coming up from behind. Again it comes under the Earth's gravitational influence; this time it is lifted onto a slower orbit, further from the Sun. On this orbit it can no longer keep pace with the Earth, and it falls behind until in 95 years it is once again approaching the Earth from in front. The Earth and 2002 AA_{29} chase each other in turn around the Sun, but do not get close enough to break the pattern.

On 8 January 2003, the asteroid approached the Earth from in front to a distance of 0.0391 AU (5,850,000 km; 3,630,000 mi), its closest approach for nearly a century. Since that date, it has been hurrying ahead (with a semi-major axis less than 1 AU), and will continue to do so until it has reached its closest approach from behind on 11 July 2097 at a distance of 0.037712 AU (5,641,600 km; 3,505,500 mi). As a result of this subtle exchange with the Earth, unlike other Earth orbit crossing asteroids, it is not expected to ever collide with the Earth. Calculations indicate that in the next few thousand years it will never come closer than 4.5 million kilometres, or about twelve times the distance from the Earth to the Moon.

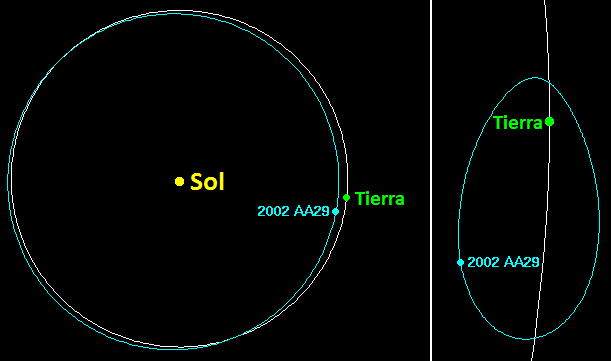
Quasi-satellite orbit of 2002 AA_{29} in the year 2589, looking vertically down on the ecliptic. Left, orbits of Asteroid and Earth in the reference frame of the fixed stars; right, in the reference frame of the Earth–Sun system. Image: JPL

Because of its orbital inclination of 10.739° to the ecliptic, 2002 AA_{29} is not always forced by the Earth on its horseshoe orbit however but can sometimes slip out of this pattern. It is then caught for a while in the neighbourhood of the Earth. This will next happen in about 600 years i.e. in the 26th century. It will then stay within the small gap in the Earth's orbit which it does not reach in its previous horseshoe orbit, and will be no further than 0.2 astronomical units (30 million km) away from the Earth. There it will slowly circle the Earth almost like a second moon, although it takes one year for a circuit. After 45 years it finally switches back into the horseshoe orbit, until it again stays near the Earth for 45 years around the year 3750 and again in 6400. In these phases in which it stays outside its horseshoe orbit it oscillates in the narrow region along the Earth's orbit where it is caught, moving back and forth in 15 years. Because it is not bound to the Earth like the Moon but is mainly under the gravitational influence of the Sun, it belongs to the bodies called quasi-satellites. This is somewhat analogous to two cars travelling side by side at the same speed and repeatedly overtaking one another but which are however not attached to each other. Orbital calculations show that 2002 AA_{29} was in this quasi-satellite orbit for 45 years from about 520 AD but because of its tiny size was too dim to have been seen. It switches approximately cyclically between the two orbital forms, but always stays for 45 years in the quasi-satellite orbit. Outside the time frame from about 520–6500 AD, the calculated orbits become chaotic i.e. not predictable, and thus for periods outside this time frame no exact statements can be made. 2002 AA_{29} was the first known heavenly body that switches between horseshoe and quasi-satellite orbits.

Animation of 2002 AA_{29} orbit from 1900 to 2140

Relative to Sun and Earth

Around Earth

Around Sun

Sun · Earth · 2002 AA_{29}

== Physical nature ==
=== Brightness and size ===
Relatively little is known about 2002 AA_{29} itself. With a size of about 20–100 metres (70–300 ft) it is very small, on account of which it is seen from the Earth as a small point even with large telescopes, and can only be observed using highly sensitive CCD cameras. At the time of its closest approach in January 2003 it had an apparent magnitude of about 20.4.

So far nothing concrete is known about the composition of 2002 AA_{29}. Because of its nearness to the Sun, it cannot however consist of volatile substances such as water ice, since these would evaporate or sublime; one can clearly observe this happening to a comet as this forms the visible tail. Presumably it will have a dark, carbon-bearing or somewhat lighter silicate-rich surface; in the former case the albedo would be around 0.05, in the latter somewhat higher at 0.15 to 0.25. It is due to this uncertainty that the figures for its diameter cover such a wide range.

A further uncertainty arises from radar echo measurements at the Arecibo Radio Telescope, which could only pick up an unexpectedly weak radar echo, implying that 2002 AA_{29} is either smaller than estimated or reflects radio waves only weakly. In the former case it would have to have an unusually high albedo. This would be evidence in support of the speculation that it, or at least the material of which it is composed, is different from most other asteroids so far discovered on near-Earth orbits, or represents a fragment thrown off by the collision of a medium-sized asteroid with the Earth or the Moon.

=== Rotational period ===
Using radar echo measurements at the Arecibo radio telescope the rotational period of 2002 AA_{29} could be determined. In this radar astronomy procedure radio waves of known wavelength are emitted from a radio telescope aimed at an asteroid. There they are reflected, and because of the Doppler effect the part of the surface that is moving towards the observer (because of the asteroid's rotation) shortens the wavelength of the reflected waves, whilst the other part which is turning away from the observer lengthens the reflected wavelength. As a result, the wavelength of the reflected waves is "smeared out". The extent of the wavelength smearing and the diameter of the asteroid allow the rotational period to be narrowed down. 33 minutes is thus calculated as the upper limit of the rotational period for 2002 AA_{29}; it probably rotates more quickly. This rapid rotation together with the small diameter and therefore low mass leads to some interesting conclusions:

- The asteroid rotates so quickly that the centrifugal force on its surface exceeds its gravitational pull. It is therefore under tension and so cannot be composed of an agglomeration of loosely bound debris or of fragments circling each other – as is supposed for several other asteroids and for example has been determined for the asteroid (69230) Hermes. Instead the body must be made of a single relatively strong block of rock or of pieces baked together. However, its tensile strength is probably considerably lower than terrestrial rock and the asteroid also very porous.
- 2002 AA_{29} cannot possibly have been built up from individual small pieces, as these would be thrown apart by the rapid rotation. Therefore, it must be a fragment blown off in the collision of two heavenly bodies. J. Richard Gott and Edward Belbruno from Princeton University have speculated that 2002 AA_{29} might have formed together with Earth and Theia, the postulated planet that, according to the giant impact hypothesis, collided with Earth in its early history.

== Outlook ==
Because its orbit is very similar to the Earth's, the asteroid is relatively easily reachable by space probes. 2002 AA_{29} would therefore be a suitable object of study for more precise research into the structure and formation of asteroids and the evolution of their orbits around the Sun. Meanwhile, further co-orbital companions of the Earth of this type on horseshoe orbits or on orbits as quasi-satellites have already been found, such as the quasi-satellite 2003 YN107. Furthermore, it is assumed that there are small trojan companions of the Earth with diameters in the region of 100 metres located at the L4 and L5 Lagrangian points of the Earth–Sun system.

== Related objects ==
- 6Q0B44E
- 2006 RH120
- 2003 YN107 – quasi-satellite of Earth
- 2010 TK7 – Trojan co-orbital companion of Earth
- 3753 Cruithne (1986 TO)
- 2001 GO2
- 2006 JY26
- 2010 SO16
- 2012 FC71

== See also ==
- Natural satellite
- Quasi-satellite
- List of asteroids
- Naming of Asteroids
- Orbital resonance
