= 2062 Aten =

Sub-kilometer asteroid

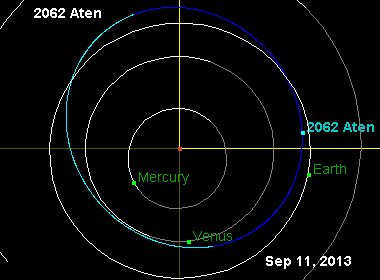
- Orbit of Aten at epoch September 2013

Discovery
- Discovered by: E. F. Helin
- Discovery site: Palomar Obs.
- Discovery date: 7 January 1976

Designations
- Pronunciation: /ˈɑːtən/
- Named after: Aten (Egyptian mythology)
- Alternative designations: 1976 AA
- Minor planet category: Aten · NEO

Orbital characteristics
- Epoch 31 December 2011 (JD 2455926.5)
- Uncertainty parameter 0
- Observation arc: 59.14 yr (21,601 days)
- Earliest precovery date: 17 December 1955
- Aphelion: 1.1434 AU
- Perihelion: 0.7901 AU
- Semi-major axis: 0.9668 AU
- Eccentricity: 0.1827
- Orbital period (sidereal): 0.95 yr (347 days)
- Mean anomaly: 172.27°
- Mean motion: 1° 2^{m} 12.48^{s} / day
- Inclination: 18.934°
- Longitude of ascending node: 108.60°
- Argument of perihelion: 148.04°
- Earth MOID: 0.1131 AU · 44.1 LD

Physical characteristics
- Dimensions: 0.73±0.03 km 0.80±0.03 km 0.91 km 1.1 km 1.30 km
- Synodic rotation period: 40.77 h
- Geometric albedo: 0.20; 0.20±0.15; 0.26; 0.28; 0.39±0.05; 0.52±0.10
- Spectral type: S (Tholen) · Sr (SMASS); B–V = 0.930; U–B = 0.460
- Absolute magnitude (H): 16.80 · 17.01±1.40 · 17.12 · 17.20 · 17.30

2062 Aten /ˈɑːtən/, (Note: Oxford English Dictionary) provisional designation 1976 AA, is a stony sub-kilometer asteroid and namesake of the Aten asteroids, a subgroup of near-Earth objects. The asteroid was named after Aten from Egyptian mythology.

It was discovered on 7 January 1976, at the Palomar Observatory by American astronomer Eleanor Helin, who was the principal scientist for the NEAT project until her retirement in 2002. The S-type asteroid measures approximately 900 meters in diameter, has a longer-than average rotation period of 44.77 hours, and approaches the orbit Earth to 44.1 lunar distances.

== Orbit and classification ==
Aten orbits the Sun at a distance of 0.8–1.1 AU once every 11 months (347 days). Its orbit has an eccentricity of 0.18 and an inclination of 19° with respect to the ecliptic. A first precovery was taken at the discovering observatory in December 1955, extending the body's observation arc by more than 20 years prior to its official discovery observation.

=== Namesake of the Aten group ===
Aten was the first asteroid found to have a semi-major orbital axis of less than one astronomical unit and a period of less than one year. A new category of asteroids was thus created, the Atens. As of 2017, the group consists of more than 1,200 numbered members. Other groups of near-Earth objects (NEOs) are the Apollo and Amor asteroids, which are both significantly larger than the Atens, while the Atira asteroids form the smallest NEO-group by far.

=== Close approaches ===
The asteroid has an Earth minimum orbit intersection distance of 0.1131 AU (16,900,000 km) which corresponds to 44.1 lunar distances.

== Physical characteristics ==
In the Tholen classification, Aten is a common S-type asteroid. In the SMASS taxonomy it is classified as an Sr-type, a subtype which transitions to the R-type asteroids.

=== Lightcurve ===
In the 1990s, Italian astronomer Stefano Mottola obtained a rotational lightcurve of Aten during the EUNEASO survey at La Silla, which was a European near-Earth object search and follow-up observation program to determine additional physical parameters. Lightcurve analysis gave a longer-than average rotation period of 40.77 hours with a brightness variation of 0.26 magnitude (U=2). No additional lightcurves have been obtained since.

=== Diameter and albedo ===
According to the survey carried out by NASA's Wide-field Infrared Survey Explorer with its subsequent NEOWISE mission, Aten measures between 700 and 830 meters in diameter and its surface has a high albedo between 0.39 and 0.52.

in 1994, Tom Gehrels published a diameter of 1.1 kilometers and an albedo of 0.26 in his book Hazards Due to Comets and Asteroids. The Warm Spitzer NEO survey ("ExploreNEOs") gives a diameter of 1.3 kilometers with an albedo of 0.20.

The Collaborative Asteroid Lightcurve Link agrees with a revised thermal model for asteroid diameters and albedos, and adopts an albedo of 0.28 with a diameter of 0.91 kilometers based on an absolute magnitude of 17.2. However, the Minor Planet Center (MPC) classifies Aten as a larger (greater than 1 km) object.

== Naming ==
This minor planet was named from Egyptian mythology after Aten, the ancient Egyptian god of the solar disk, originally an aspect of the god Ra. The official naming citation was published by the Minor Planet Center on 1 August 1978 (M.P.C. 4420).
