= (85770) 1998 UP1 =

Near-Earth asteroid

(85770) 1998 UP_{1}
Discovery
- Discovered by: LINEAR
- Discovery site: Lincoln Lab's ETS
- Discovery date: 18 October 1998

Designations
- Minor planet category: NEO · Aten

Orbital characteristics
- Epoch 13 January 2016 (JD 2457400.5)
- Uncertainty parameter 0
- Observation arc: 8787 days (24.06 yr)
- Aphelion: 1.3427 AU (200.87 Gm)
- Perihelion: 0.65377 AU (97.803 Gm)
- Semi-major axis: 0.99826 AU (149.338 Gm)
- Eccentricity: 0.34509
- Orbital period (sidereal): 1.00 yr (364.30 d)
- Mean anomaly: 193.86°
- Mean motion: 0° 59^{m} 17.484^{s} / day
- Inclination: 33.180°
- Longitude of ascending node: 18.357°
- Argument of perihelion: 234.27°
- Earth MOID: 0.0833366 AU (12.46698 Gm)

Physical characteristics
- Mean diameter: 210–470 meters
- Absolute magnitude (H): 20.5

(85770) 1998 UP_{1} is a near-Earth, Aten asteroid orbiting at nearly a 1:1 resonance with Earth.

== Orbit ==
With an orbital period of 364.3 days, 1998 UP_{1} is in a near 1:1 orbital resonance with Earth. Although their periods are almost identical, their orbits are very different; 1998 UP_{1} has a highly eccentric orbit and moves between 0.65–1.35 AU from the Sun, it is also very highly inclined at 33°. The preliminary period of 1998 UP_{1} was originally thought to be slightly longer than 1 year producing an error in the predicted position of about 35 degrees; it was selected as a priority for recovery and recovered by the Camarillo Observatory on 12 October 1999.

1998 UP_{1} also makes close approaches to Venus and will pass at a nominal distance of 0.02563 AU (3,830,000 km; 2,380,000 mi) from Venus at 19:13 hours on 24 January 2115.

Animation of (85770) 1998 UP_{1} orbit from 1600 to 2500

Relative to Sun and Earth

Around Earth

Around Sun

Sun · Earth · (85770) 1998 UP_{1}
