= 54509 YORP =

Earth co-orbital asteroid

- Radar image and 3D model of YORP

Discovery
- Discovered by: LINEAR
- Discovery site: Lincoln Lab's ETS
- Discovery date: 3 August 2000

Designations
- Named after: YORP effect
- Alternative designations: 2000 PH_{5}
- Minor planet category: Apollo NEO

Orbital characteristics
- Epoch 21 November 2025 (JD 2461000.5)
- Uncertainty parameter 0
- Observation arc: 1826 days (5.00 yr)
- Aphelion: 1.23717 AU (185.078 Gm)
- Perihelion: 0.77455 AU (115.871 Gm)
- Semi-major axis: 1.00586 AU (150.475 Gm)
- Eccentricity: 0.22996
- Orbital period (sidereal): 1.01 yr (368.47 d)
- Average orbital speed: 29.31 km/s
- Mean anomaly: 130.15693°
- Mean motion: 0° 58^{m} 37.245^{s} / day
- Inclination: 1.59946°
- Longitude of ascending node: 278.18528°
- Argument of perihelion: 278.99884°
- Earth MOID: 0.000495246 AU (74,087.7 km)
- Jupiter MOID: 3.72092 AU (556.642 Gm)
- T_{Jupiter}: 6.029

Physical characteristics
- Dimensions: 150 × 128 × 93 m
- Sidereal rotation period: 0.2029 h 12.174 min
- Axial tilt: 173°
- Pole ecliptic longitude: 180°
- Pole ecliptic latitude: −85°
- Absolute magnitude (H): 22.7 (JPL)

54509 YORP (provisional designation 2000 PH_{5}) is an Earth co-orbital asteroid discovered on 3 August 2000 by the Lincoln Laboratory Near-Earth Asteroid Research (LINEAR) Team at Lincoln Laboratory Experimental Test Site in Socorro, New Mexico. Measurements of the rotation rate of this object provided the first observational evidence of the YORP effect, hence the name of the asteroid. The asteroid's rate of rotation is increasing at the rate of (2.0 ± 0.2) × 10^{−4} deg/day^{2} which between 2001 and 2005 caused the asteroid to rotate about 250° further than its spin rate in 2001 would have predicted. Simulations of the asteroid suggest that it may reach a rotation period of ~20 seconds near the end of its expected lifetime, which has a 75% probability of happening within the next 35 million years. The simulations also ruled out the possibility that close encounters with the Earth have been the cause of the increased spin rate.

== Discovery and naming ==
YORP was discovered on 3 August 2000 by the Lincoln Near-Earth Asteroid Research (LINEAR) program at the Lincoln Laboratory's Experimental Test Site in Socorro, New Mexico, United States. It was given the provisional designation 2000 PH_{5}, and its discovery was announced in a Minor Planets Electronic Circular on 7 August. At the time of discovery, YORP was located 0.04 astronomical units (AU; 6 million km; 4 million mi) away from Earth. Once its orbit was sufficiently determined, it was numbered 54509 by the Minor Planet Center on 16 February 2003. It is named after researchers Ivan Yarkovsky, John O'Keefe, Vladimir Radzievskij, and Stephen Paddock, contributors to the understanding of the mechanisms behind the YORP effect and after whom the effect is named. The name was chosen as the asteroid provided the first direct observational evidence for the effect; the name was announced in Minor Planet Circular 59387 on 2 April 2007.

== Orbit ==
YORP orbits the Sun with an average distance, or semi-major axis, of 1.006 AU, completing one orbit in 368.5 days. Due to its orbital eccentricity of 0.23, its distance from the Sun varies from 0.775 AU at perihelion to 1.237 AU at aphelion, crossing Earth's orbit. YORP's orbit is inclined by 1.6° with respect to the ecliptic plane.

YORP is classified as an Apollo asteroid, a subgroup of Earth-crossing near-Earth asteroids (NEAs) with semi-major axes greater than 1 AU. YORP is also classified as an Earth co-orbital; it is in a near-1:1 mean-motion resonance with Earth in a horseshoe configuration. In a horseshoe configuration, the asteroid's orbit librates between the L_{4} and L_{5} Lagrange points, traversing the L_{3} point. Over a cycle lasting about 100 years, YORP librates until it experiences a close encounter with Earth, after which its libration reverses direction until it encounters Earth again. Because of its eccentricity, its encounters with Earth are close, coming within a few lunar distances. For the past cycle, YORP trailed Earth, approaching it at a rate of roughly 3° per year. It encountered Earth in July 2003, where its semi-major axis was raised from 0.994 AU to 1.006 AU. It is currently lagging behind by 3° per year; it will reach the other end of its horseshoe path about 100 years from now.

== Possible asteroid group ==
YORP is the largest member of a candidate asteroid group. More than a dozen NEAs have similar orbital properties to YORP, including 2017 DR109, which also follows a horseshoe trajectory. A 2018 study by Carlos and Raul de la Fuente Marcos concluded that the asteroids are likely dynamically if not genetically related, but the scarcity of spectroscopic data and the poorly determined orbits of several candidate members prevented a definitive confirmation. Several of these asteroids may originate from YORP effect-driven mass shedding of 54509 YORP, tidal disruption events from close Earth and Venus encounters, and collisional disruption.

Potential members (Note: Orbital elements as of epoch 4 September 2017 (JD 2458000.5), with the exception of 2012 VZ_{19}, which is of epoch 5 November 2012 (JD 2456236.5).)
Asteroid	a (AU)	e	i (°)	Earth MOID (AU)	H (mag)
54509 YORP	1.0062	0.2302	1.5993	0.0028	22.7
2009 HE_{60}	0.9958	0.2649	1.5848	0.0154	25.6
2012 VZ_{19}	0.9825	0.2541	1.2474	0.0111	25.6
(488490) 2000 AF_{20}	1.0341	0.2768	2.4084	0.0182	21.7
2017 BU	1.0196	0.2512	1.5052	0.0229	25.1
2015 YA	0.9962	0.2794	1.6192	0.0035	27.4
2008 UB_{95}	0.9897	0.2686	3.2372	0.0003	24.7
2016 JA	0.0132	0.2685	0.0579	0.0002	27.6
2017 DR109	1.0006	0.2414	3.0600	0.0062	27.6
2012 BD_{14}	1.0176	0.2405	1.5356	0.0080	26.5
2000 QX_{69}	1.0101	0.2715	4.5740	0.0002	24.2
2014 NZ_{64}	1.0368	0.2734	4.4945	0.0092	22.8
2010 FN	0.9896	0.2110	0.1237	0.0008	26.6
2002 VX_{91}	0.9840	0.2013	2.3417	0.0018	24.3
(471984) 2013 UE_{3}	1.0262	0.2257	3.3574	0.0235	22.7
2007 WU_{3}	1.0113	0.2040	2.3933	0.0402	23.8
2009 BK_{2}	1.0125	0.2126	3.5534	0.0260	25.3
2011 OJ_{45}	1.0169	0.2037	0.7492	0.0076	26.0
2017 FZ2	1.0071	0.2641	1.8117	0.0014	26.7

== Physical characteristics ==
YORP's size and shape has been directly measured through radar observations conducted by the Goldstone observatory on 27–28 July 2001 and the Arecibo Telescope on 27–28 July 2004 and 24–26 July 2005. Various shape models were compared against Doppler images of YORP, with the best-fit model having a diameter of 112.8 metres (370 ft) and dimensions of 149 by 134 by 96 metres (489 ft × 440 ft × 315 ft). YORP has a very irregular shape, with Doppler imagery revealing convex, linear, and concave topography features. Its northern hemisphere is flattened, though it has a prominent concavity.

=== Rotation ===
YORP has a retrograde spin, with an axial tilt of 173° relative to its orbit normal. Its spin axis points towards the ecliptic south, lying within 10° of the J2000 ecliptic coordinates (180°, –85°). Observations of YORP's lightcurve, or fluctuations in brightness as it rotates, suggests a sidereal rotation period of 12.17 minutes, which has been corroborated by radar observations. YORP's fast rotation and small size classifies it as a monolithic fast rotator.

In 2007, two studies—one led by Stephen C. Lowry and the other led by Patrick A. Taylor—investigated changes in YORP's rotation period over time, reporting the direct detection of the YORP effect. This was the first direct observational evidence of the YORP effect; previously, evidence of the effect was indirect, manifesting in the anomalous distributions of some asteroids' rotation periods and axial tilts. YORP's lightcurve data from 2001 to 2005 suggests its rotation period is fractionally decreasing by 1.7×10^{−6} per year. Taylor and collaborators used YORP's shape model to theoretically derive the expected change in its rotation period under the YORP effect. Despite incomplete shape and thermal data, theoretical predictions agreed within an order of magnitude with the observed change in period. Tidal torques from repeated close encounters with Earth were ruled out as an explanation, leaving the YORP effect as the most likely explanation for the change in the asteroid's spin.

== Gallery ==
Animation of 54509 YORP orbit from 1600 to 2500

Relative to Sun and Earth

Around Earth

Around Sun

Sun · Earth · 54509 YORP

== See also ==
- 1620 Geographos
- 1862 Apollo
- 25143 Itokawa
- 2002 AA29
- 2003 YN107
- (419624) 2010 SO16
