= (419624) 2010 SO16 =

Asteroid

(419624) 2010 SO_{16}
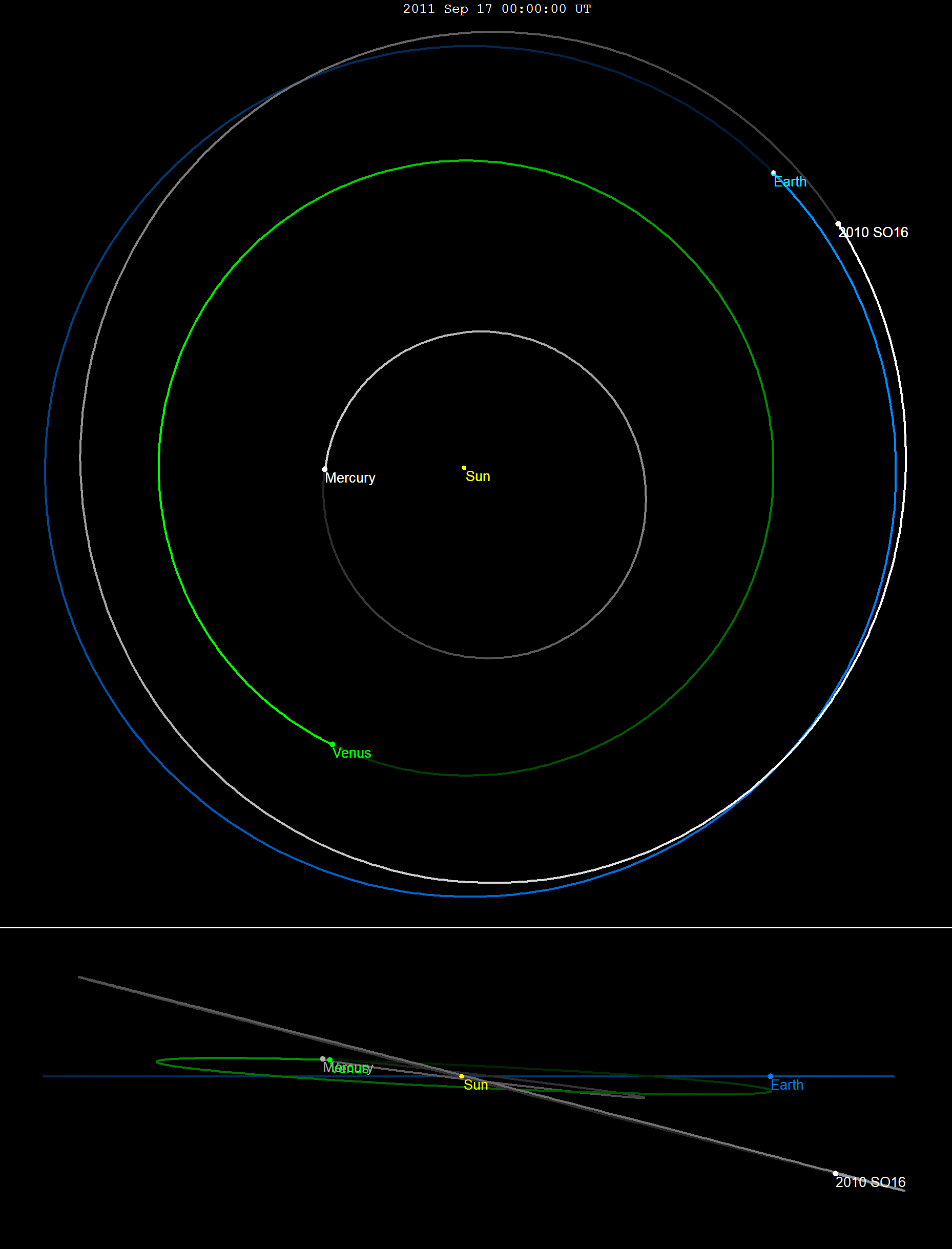
- Orbit with inner Solar System

Discovery
- Discovered by: WISE
- Discovery site: Low Earth orbit
- Discovery date: 17 September 2010

Designations
- Minor planet category: Apollo · NEO · PHA

Orbital characteristics
- Epoch 4 September 2017 (JD 2458000.5)
- Uncertainty parameter 0
- Observation arc: 5.28 yr (1,928 days)
- Aphelion: 1.0785 AU
- Perihelion: 0.9272 AU
- Semi-major axis: 1.0028 AU
- Eccentricity: 0.0754
- Orbital period (sidereal): 1.00 yr (367 days)
- Mean anomaly: 173.30°
- Mean motion: 0° 58^{m} 53.04^{s} / day
- Inclination: 14.520°
- Longitude of ascending node: 40.397°
- Argument of perihelion: 108.99°
- Earth MOID: 0.0299 AU (11.6 LD)

Physical characteristics
- Mean diameter: 0.357±0.126 km
- Geometric albedo: 0.084±0.057
- Absolute magnitude (H): 20.5

(419624) 2010 SO_{16} is a sub-kilometer asteroid in a co-orbital configuration with Earth, classified as a near-Earth object and potentially hazardous asteroid of the Apollo group. It was discovered by the Wide-field Infrared Survey Explorer space telescope (WISE) on 17 September 2010.

== Description ==
The orbit was described by Apostolos Christou and David Asher at the Armagh Observatory in Northern Ireland. The object has an absolute magnitude of 20.5. Observations by the discovering WISE telescope give a diameter of 357 meters and an albedo of 0.084.

2010 SO_{16} has a horseshoe orbit that allows it to stably share Earth's orbital neighborhood without colliding with it. It is one of a handful of known asteroids with an Earth-following orbit, a group that includes 3753 Cruithne, and the only known asteroid in an horseshoe orbit with Earth. It is, however, neither an Aten asteroid nor an Apollo asteroid because the semi-major axis of its orbit is neither less than nor greater than 1 AU, but oscillates between approximately 0.996 and 1.004 AU, with a period of about 350 years. In its ~350 yr horseshoe cycle, it never approaches Earth more closely than about 0.15 AU, alternately trailing and leading.

According to various simulations 2010 SO_{16} will remain in this orbit for at least 120,000 years and possibly for more than a million years, which is unusually stable compared to other similar objects. One reason for this stability is its low orbital eccentricity, $< 0.084$.

A precovery of 2010 SO_{16} may have been located in a 2005 Spitzer Space Telescope image.

Animation of (419624) 2010 SO_{16} orbit from 1600 to 2500

Relative to Sun and Earth

Around Earth - Polar view

Around Earth - Equatorial view

Around Sun

Sun · Earth · (419624) 2010 SO_{16}

== See also ==
- 3753 Cruithne – a horseshoe companion of the Earth
- 2006 RH120 – a small asteroid that sometimes temporarily gets caught in Earth orbit
- 2002 AA29 – a horseshoe companion of the Earth
- Natural satellite
- 2001 GO2
- 2002 AA29
- 2003 YN107
- 2006 JY26
- 2012 FC71
- Orbital resonance
