= 3753 Cruithne =

Aten asteroid co-orbital with Earth

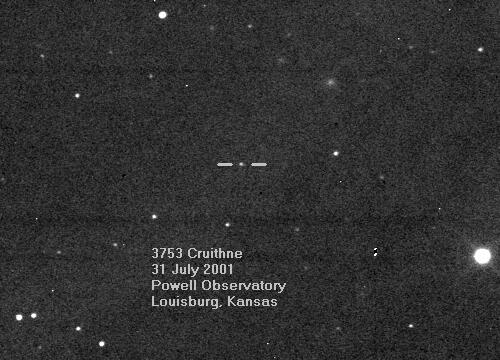

Discovery
- Discovered by: Duncan Waldron
- Discovery date: 10 October 1986

Designations
- Pronunciation: English: /kruˈiːnjə/ kroo-EEN-yə; Irish: [ˈkɾˠɪ(h)nʲə, ˈkɾˠʊnʲə]
- Named after: Cruthin
- Alternative designations: 1983 UH; 1986 TO
- Minor planet category: NEO; Aten; horseshoe; Venus-crosser; Mars-crosser

Orbital characteristics
- Epoch 4 September 2017 (JD 2458000.5)
- Uncertainty parameter 0
- Observation arc: 16087 days (44.04 yr)
- Aphelion: 1.5114 AU (226,100,000 km)
- Perihelion: 0.48405 AU (72,413,000 km)
- Semi-major axis: 0.99774 AU (149,260,000 km)
- Eccentricity: 0.51485 (213000 wrt Earth)
- Orbital period (sidereal): 1.00 yr (364.02 d)
- Average orbital speed: 27.73 km/s
- Mean anomaly: 257.46°
- Mean motion: 0° 59^{m} 20.436^{s} / day
- Inclination: 19.805°
- Longitude of ascending node: 126.23°
- Argument of perihelion: 43.831°
- Earth MOID: 0.07119 AU (10,650,000 km)

Physical characteristics
- Mean diameter: ~5 km
- Mass: 1.3×10^{14} kg
- Synodic rotation period: 27.30990 h (1.137913 d)
- Geometric albedo: 0.15
- Spectral type: Q
- Absolute magnitude (H): 15.6

3753 Cruithne is a Q-type, Aten asteroid in orbit around the Sun in 1:1 orbital resonance with Earth, making it a co-orbital object. It is an asteroid that, relative to Earth, orbits the Sun in a bean-shaped orbit that effectively describes a horseshoe, and that can change into a quasi-satellite orbit. Cruithne does not orbit Earth and at times it is on the other side of the Sun, placing Cruithne well outside of Earth's Hill sphere. Its orbit takes it near the orbit of Mercury and outside the orbit of Mars. Cruithne orbits the Sun in about one Earth year, but it takes 770 years for the series to complete a horseshoe-shaped movement around Earth.

The asteroid takes its name from the Cruithne, a people mentioned in early Irish annals.

== Discovery ==
Cruithne was discovered on 10 October 1986 by Duncan Waldron on a photographic plate taken with the UK Schmidt Telescope at Siding Spring Observatory, Coonabarabran, Australia. A 1983 precovery (1983 UH) is credited to Giovanni de Sanctis and Richard M. West of the European Southern Observatory in Chile.

It was not until 1997 that its unusual orbit was determined by Paul Wiegert and Kimmo Innanen, working at York University in Toronto, and Seppo Mikkola, working at the University of Turku in Finland.

== Dimensions and orbit ==
Cruithne and Earth seem to follow each other because of a 1:1 orbital resonance.

Cruithne appears to make a bean-shaped orbit from the perspective of Earth.

Animation of 3753 Cruithne orbit from 1600 to 2500 Sun · Earth · 3753 Cruithne

Cruithne is approximately 5 kilometres (3 mi) in diameter, and its closest approach to Earth is 12 million kilometres (0.080 AU; 7,500,000 mi), approximately thirty times the separation between Earth and the Moon. From 1994 through 2015, Cruithne made its annual closest approach to Earth every November.

Although Cruithne's orbit is not thought to be stable over the long term, calculations by Wiegert and Innanen showed that it has probably been synchronized with Earth's orbit for a long time. There is no danger of a collision with Earth for millions of years, if ever. Its orbital path and Earth's do not cross, and its orbital plane is currently tilted relative to that of Earth by 19.8°. Cruithne, having a maximum near-Earth magnitude of +15.8, is fainter than Pluto and would require at least a 320-millimetre (12.5 in) reflecting telescope to be seen.

Cruithne is in a normal elliptic orbit around the Sun. Its period of revolution around the Sun, approximately 364 days in the early 21st century, is almost equal to that of Earth. Because of this, Cruithne and Earth appear to "follow" each other in their paths around the Sun. This is why Cruithne is sometimes called "Earth's second moon". However, it does not orbit Earth and is not a moon. In 2058, Cruithne will come within 0.09 AU (13.6 million kilometres or 8.5 million miles) of Mars.

Due to a high orbital eccentricity, Cruithne's distance from the Sun and orbital speed vary much more than Earth's, so from Earth's point of view Cruithne actually follows a kidney-bean-shaped horseshoe orbit ahead of Earth, taking slightly less than one year to complete a circuit of the "bean". Because it takes slightly less than a year, Earth "falls behind" the bean a little more each year, and so, from the point of view of an observer on Earth, the circuit is not quite closed, but rather like a spiral loop that moves slowly away from Earth.

After many years, Earth will have fallen so far behind that Cruithne will then actually be "catching up" on Earth from "behind". When it eventually does catch up, Cruithne will make a series of annual close approaches to Earth and gravitationally exchange orbital energy with Earth; this will alter Cruithne's orbit by a little over half a million kilometres—while Earth's orbit is altered by about 1.3 centimetres (0.51 in)—so that its period of revolution around the Sun will then become slightly more than a year. The kidney bean will then start to migrate away from Earth again in the opposite direction—instead of Earth "falling behind" the bean, it is "pulling away from" the bean. The next such series of close approaches will be centred on the year 2292—in July of that year, Cruithne will approach Earth to about 12.5 million kilometres (0.084 AU; 7,800,000 mi).

After 380 to 390 years or so, the kidney-bean-shaped orbit approaches Earth again from the other side, and Earth, once more, alters the orbit of Cruithne so that its period of revolution around the Sun is again slightly less than a year (this last happened with a series of close approaches centered on 1902, and will next happen with a series centered on 2676). The pattern then repeats itself.

== Similar minor planets ==
More near-resonant near-Earth objects (NEOs) have since been discovered. These include 54509 YORP, (85770) 1998 UP1, 2002 AA29, and 2009 BD which exist in resonant orbits similar to Cruithne's. (706765) 2010 TK7 is the first identified Earth trojan (out of only two known as of 2024).

Other examples of natural bodies known to be in horseshoe orbits (with respect to each other) include Janus and Epimetheus, natural satellites of Saturn. The orbits these two moons follow around Saturn are much simpler than the one Cruithne follows, but operate along the same general principles.

Mars has four known co-orbital asteroids (5261 Eureka, 1999 UJ7, 1998 VF31, and 2007 NS2, all at the Lagrangian points), and Jupiter has many (an estimated one million greater than 1 km in diameter, the Jovian trojans); there are also other small co-orbital moons in the Saturnian system: Telesto and Calypso with Tethys, and Helene and Polydeuces with Dione. However, none of these follow horseshoe orbits.

== In popular culture ==
Cruithne plays a major role in Stephen Baxter's novel Manifold: Time, which was nominated for the Arthur C. Clarke Award for best science fiction in 2000.

Cruithne is mentioned in the QI series A episode "Astronomy", in which it is described as a second moon of Earth. In a later episode ("Knowledge" in series K), it was added that, if the same definition is used, Earth has over 18,000 "mini-moons".

In Astonishing X-Men, Cruithne is the site of a secret lab assaulted by Abigail Brand and her S.W.O.R.D. team. It contains many Brood before Brand destroys it.

In the Insignia trilogy, 3753 Cruithne is moved into orbit around Earth to serve as a training ground for the Intrasolar Forces. In the third novel, Catalyst, it is intentionally directed at Earth. While it is destroyed before impact, its fragments rain down on Earth's surface, killing nearly 800 million people.

== Gallery ==
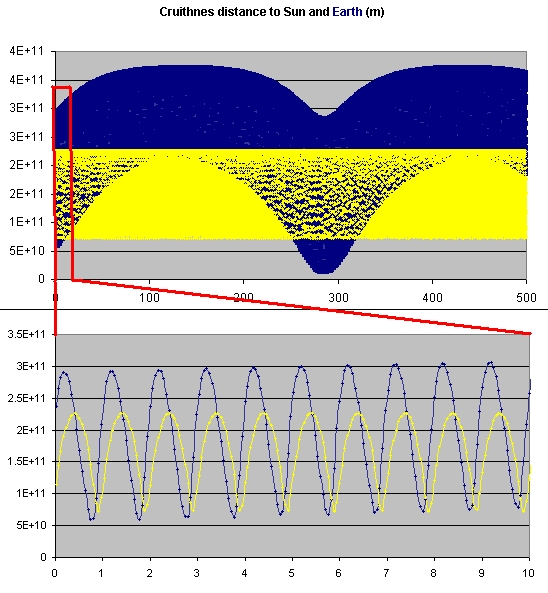
Cruithne's distance to Earth (blue) and the Sun (yellow) plotted over 500 years (top) and 10 years (bottom)

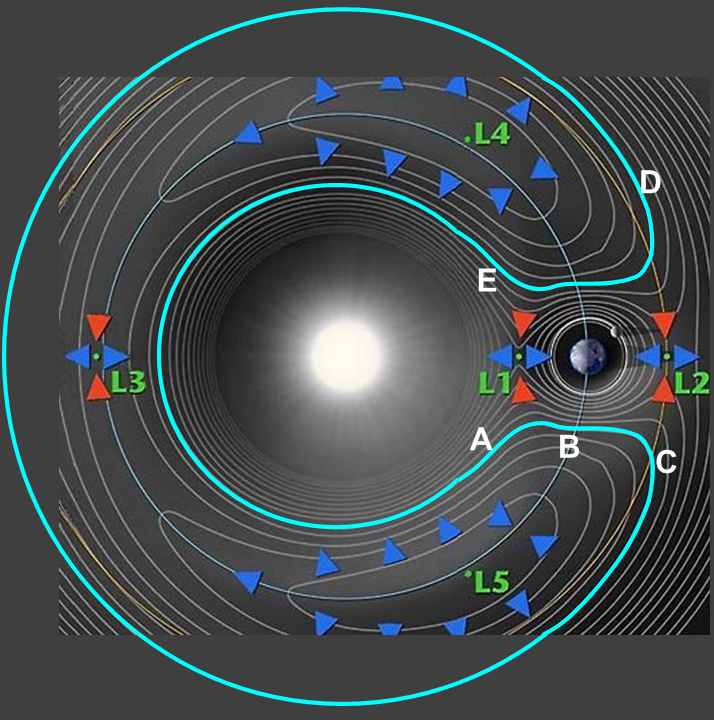
Plan showing possible orbits along gravitational contours (not to scale)

An example of a horseshoe orbit
Sun · Earth · (419624) 2010 SO16

== See also ==
- 2006 RH120 – temporary Earth satellite discovered in 2006
- 2010 SO16
- Co-orbital configuration
- Earth's second moon
- Natural satellite
- Quasi-satellite
- List of Earth-crossing asteroids
