= 2023 FY3 =

Temporary satellite capture

2023 FY_{3}
Discovery
- Discovered by: K. W. Wierzchos (Catalina Sky Survey)
- Discovery date: 25 March 2023

Designations
- Minor planet category: NEO; Apollo; risk listed

Orbital characteristics
- Epoch 2023-Sep-13 (JD 2460200.5)
- Uncertainty parameter 3
- Observation arc: 30 days
- Aphelion: 1.1409631 AU (Q)
- Perihelion: 0.9971420 AU (q)
- Semi-major axis: 1.0690525 AU (a)
- Eccentricity: 0.0672657 (e)
- Orbital period (sidereal): 1.1054 years
- Mean anomaly: 177.4436° (M)
- Inclination: 0.593148° (i)
- Longitude of ascending node: 1.8263° (Ω)
- Time of perihelion: 2023-Feb-25.99916
- Argument of perihelion: 154.4419° (ω)
- Earth MOID: 0.00452285 AU (676,609 km; 1.76015 LD)
- Jupiter MOID: 3.82341 AU (571,974,000 km)

Physical characteristics
- Dimensions: ~5 m (16 ft); 5 meters
- Absolute magnitude (H): 29.0

2023 FY_{3} is a near-Earth object roughly 5 meters (16 ft) in diameter discovered by K. W. Wierzchos observing with the 0.68-m Schmidt + 10K CCD of the Catalina Sky Survey.

== Details ==
The object orbits the Sun but makes slow close approaches to the Earth–Moon system. Due to its Earth-like orbit, the object might be of artificial origin or lunar ejecta. However, visible spectroscopy obtained with the Gran Telescopio Canarias shows that it is an asteroid. The closest approach to Earth in 2023 was 23 March 2023 at roughly 0.00369 au (343,000 mi) when it had a relative velocity of 1.46 km/s (3,300 mph).

The reflectance spectrum of 2023 FY_{3} suggests that its origin is not artificial and also that it is not lunar ejecta; it is also different from the V type of 2020 CD3 and the K-type of 2022 NX_{1}. It is a S type asteroid and considering typical values of the albedo of the S-type asteroids and its absolute magnitude, 2023 FY_{3} may have a size range of 5 m. Its light curve gives a rotation period of 9.3±0.6 min with an amplitude of 0.48±0.13 mag. This small asteroid roams the edge of Earth's co-orbital space and it is part of the Arjuna class. Currently exhibits horseshoe-like resonant behavior and experienced minimoon engagements of the temporarily captured flyby type in the past that may repeat in the future.

== See also ==
- 1991 VG – near-Earth asteroid temporarily captured by Earth after its discovery in 1991
- 2006 RH120 – the first temporary Earth satellite discovered in situ 2006
- 2020 CD3 – another temporary Earth satellite discovered in 2020
- 2022 NX1 – another temporary Earth satellite discovered in 2022
- 2020 SO – a suspected near-Earth object identified as a rocket booster from the Surveyor 2 mission
