= 2024 PT5 =

Temporary satellite of Earth

2024 PT_{5}
Discovery
- Discovered by: ATLAS South Africa, Sutherland
- Discovery date: 7 August 2024

Designations
- Alternative designations: A119q0V
- Minor planet category: NEO; Apollo

Orbital characteristics
- Epoch 2024-Oct-17 (JD 2460600.5)
- Uncertainty parameter 0
- Observation arc: 177 days
- Aphelion: 1.034046037 AU (Q)
- Perihelion: 0.990564085 AU (q)
- Semi-major axis: 1.012305061 AU (a)
- Eccentricity: 0.021476704 (e)
- Orbital period (sidereal): 1.018533493 years
- Mean anomaly: 323.67726° (M)
- Inclination: 1.5205167° (i)
- Longitude of ascending node: 305.572361° (Ω)
- Time of perihelion: 2024-Nov-23.53545
- Argument of perihelion: 116.24843° (ω)
- Earth MOID: 0.00607821 AU (909,287 km; 2.36545 LD)
- Jupiter MOID: 3.95662 AU (591,902,000 km)

Physical characteristics
- Dimensions: ~ 11 m (36 ft); 5–42 meters
- Synodic rotation period: ≤ 1h
- Absolute magnitude (H): 27.4

2024 PT_{5} is a near-Earth object roughly 11 meters (36 ft) in diameter discovered by ATLAS South Africa, Sutherland on 7 August 2024. It became a temporary satellite of Earth for a few months later that year.

== Orbit ==
The object orbits the Sun but makes slow close approaches to the Earth–Moon system. Between 29 September (19:54 UTC) and 25 November 2024 (16:43 UTC) (a period of 1 month and 27 days) it passed just outside Earth's Hill sphere (roughly 0.01 AU [1.5 million km; 0.93 million mi]) at a low relative velocity (in the range 0.002 km/s (4.5 mph) – 0.439 km/s [980 mph]) and became temporarily captured by Earth's gravity, with a geocentric orbital eccentricity of less than 1 and negative geocentric orbital energy. The most recent closest approach to Earth was 8 August 2024 at roughly 567,000 km (352,000 mi) when it had a relative velocity of 1.37 km/s (3,100 mph). It also approached Earth on 9 January 2025 at roughly 1,801,158 km (1,119,188 mi) when it had a relative velocity of 1.03 km/s (2,300 mph).

On 18 August 2024 CNEOS removed 2024 PT_{5} from their Sentry Risk Table, having determined it poses no risk of a potential Earth impact.

The object is expected to make another approach in 2055. This object will return to orbit around Earth in 2084 for about 43 days.

Animation of 2024 PT_{5}

Around the Earth – Close approach

2024 PT_{5} · Earth · Moon

Entering and Exiting Geocentric Orbit
Epoch	Earth distance	Geocentric eccentricity	Apogee	Orbital period
2024-Sep-29	0.0230 AU (3.44 million km)	1.016	$\infty$	$\infty$
2024-Sep-30	0.0232 AU (3.47 million km)	0.997	2.9 AU (430 million km)	99.84 years (36,468 d)
2024-Oct-24	0.0268 AU (4.01 million km)	0.614	0.028 AU (4.2 million km)	1.35 years (493 d)
2024-Nov-25	0.0238 AU (3.56 million km)	0.983	0.72 AU (108 million km)	127.24 years (46,473 d)
2024-Nov-26	0.0236 AU (3.53 million km)	1.009	$\infty$	$\infty$

== Physical properties ==
Its color indices and the spectrum obtained with Gemini North best matches lunar rock samples followed by S-complex asteroids and has a rotation period of around 0.7h. Its visible spectrum obtained with GTC is consistent with that of an Sv-type asteroid or perhaps lunar ejecta. Its reflectance spectrum in the range 350–2,350 nanometres (3,500–23,500 Å) obtained with LDT/IRTF is inconsistent with artificial objects and asteroids, its surface is quite red, well matched by samples of the Moon, both Maria and Highlands. Its spectrum is similar to that of Earth's quasi-satellite 469219 Kamoʻoalewa and Earth's minimoon 2022 NX1.

In January 2025, scientists determined that 2024 PT_{5} is composed of ejecta from an impact on the Moon and also determined 2024 PT_{5}'s orbital path was dominantly heliocentric and so should not be considered a minimoon.

== See also ==
- 1991 VG – near-Earth asteroid temporarily captured by Earth after its discovery in 1991
- 2006 RH120 – the first temporary Earth satellite discovered in situ 2006
- 2020 CD3 – another temporary Earth satellite discovered in 2020
- 2022 NX1 – another temporary Earth satellite discovered in 2022
- 2020 SO – a suspected near-Earth object identified as a rocket booster from the 1966 Surveyor 2 mission
- 469219 Kamoʻoalewa – a quasi-satellite of Earth of probable Lunar origin
- Arjuna asteroid
