= Temporary satellite =

Object captured by a planet for a while

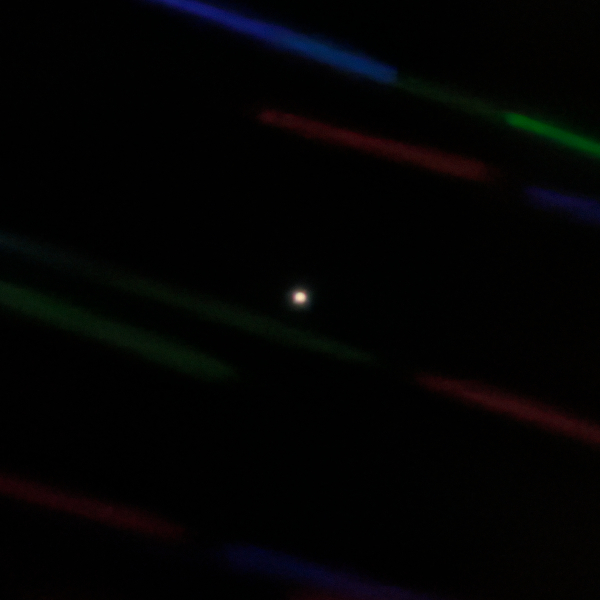
2020 CD3, a temporary satellite of Earth

A temporary satellite is an object which has been captured by the gravitational field of a planet and thus has become the planet's natural satellite, but, unlike irregular moons of the larger outer planets of the Solar System, will eventually either leave its orbit around the planet or collide with the planet. Examples include 2006 RH120, a temporary satellite of Earth for twelve months from July 2006 to July 2007, 2020 CD3 and 2022 NX_{1}. Some defunct space probes or rockets have also been observed on temporary satellite orbits.

In astrophysics, a temporary satellite is any body that enters the Hill sphere of a planet at a sufficiently low velocity such that it becomes gravitationally bound to the planet for some period of time.

== Capture of asteroids ==
The dynamics of the capture of asteroids by Earth was explored in simulations conducted on a supercomputer, with results published in 2012. Of 10 million virtual near-Earth asteroids, 18,000 have been temporarily captured. Earth has at least one temporary satellite 1 m (3.3 ft) across at any given time, but they are too faint to detect by current surveys.

According to the simulations, temporary satellites are typically caught and released when they pass one of two gravitational equilibrium points of the Sun and the planet along the line connecting the two, the L1 and L2 Lagrangian points. The captured asteroids typically have orbits very similar to the planet's (co-orbital configuration) and are captured most often when the planet is closest to the Sun (in the case of the Earth, in January) or furthest from the Sun (Earth: in July).

In strict sense, only bodies that complete a full orbit around a planet are considered temporary satellites, also called temporarily captured orbiters (TCO). However, asteroids not in a tight co-orbital configuration with a planet can be temporarily captured for less than a full orbit; such objects have been named temporarily captured fly-bys (TCF). In a 2017 follow-up to the 2012 simulation study which also considered an improved model of near-Earth asteroid populations, 40% of captured objects were TCF. The combined number of TCO/TCF was found to be smaller than in the previous study, the maximum size of objects which can be expected to be orbiting Earth at any given moment was 0.8 m (2.6 ft). In another 2017 study based on simulations with one million virtual co-orbital asteroids, 0.36% have been temporarily captured.

== Examples ==
As of February 2020, two objects have been observed at the time when they were temporary satellites: 2006 RH120 and 2020 CD_{3}. According to orbital calculations, on its solar orbit, 2006 RH_{120} passes Earth at low speed every 20 to 21 years, at which point it can become a temporary satellite again.

As of March 2018, there is one confirmed example of a temporarily captured asteroid that did not complete a full orbit, 1991 VG. This asteroid was observed for a month after its discovery in November 1991, then again in April 1992, after which it wasn't seen until May 2017. After the recovery, orbital calculations confirmed that 1991 VG was a temporary satellite of Earth in February 1992. Another temporary capture episode was experienced by 2022 NX1 that may return as a mini-moon in December 2051. From 29 September 2024 to 25 November 2024, 2024 PT5 was temporarily captured by Earth, though it did not complete a full revolution.

Known and suspected companions of Earth
Name	Eccentricity	Diameter (m)	Discoverer	Date of discovery	Type	Current type
Moon	0.055	3474800	N/A	Prehistory	Natural satellite	Natural satellite
1913 Great Meteor Procession	unknown	unknown	unknown	1913-02-09	Possible temporary satellite	Destroyed
3753 Cruithne	0.515	5000	Duncan Waldron	1986-10-10	Quasi-satellite	Horseshoe orbit
1991 VG	0.053	5–12	Spacewatch	1991-11-06	Temporary satellite	Apollo asteroid
(85770) 1998 UP1	0.345	210–470	Lincoln Lab's ETS	1998-10-18	Horseshoe orbit	Horseshoe orbit
54509 YORP	0.230	124	Lincoln Lab's ETS	2000-08-03	Horseshoe orbit	Horseshoe orbit
2001 GO2	0.168	35–85	Lincoln Lab's ETS	2001-04-13	Possible horseshoe orbit	Possible horseshoe orbit
2002 AA29	0.013	20–100	LINEAR	2002-01-09	Quasi-satellite	Horseshoe orbit
2003 YN107	0.014	10–30	LINEAR	2003-12-20	Quasi-satellite	Horseshoe orbit
164207 Cardea	0.136	160–360	LINEAR	2004-04-13	Quasi-satellite	Quasi-satellite
(277810) 2006 FV35	0.377	140–320	Spacewatch	2006-03-29	Quasi-satellite	Quasi-satellite
2006 JY26	0.083	6–13	Catalina Sky Survey	2006-05-06	Horseshoe orbit	Horseshoe orbit
2006 RH120	0.024	2–3	Catalina Sky Survey	2006-09-13	Temporary satellite	Apollo asteroid
(419624) 2010 SO16	0.075	357	WISE	2010-09-17	Horseshoe orbit	Horseshoe orbit
(706765) 2010 TK7	0.191	150–500	WISE	2010-10-01	Earth trojan	Earth trojan
2013 BS45	0.083	20–40	Spacewatch	2010-01-20	Horseshoe orbit	Horseshoe orbit
2013 LX28	0.452	130–300	Pan-STARRS	2013-06-12	Quasi-satellite temporary	Quasi-satellite temporary
2014 OL339	0.461	70–160	EURONEAR	2014-07-29	Quasi-satellite temporary	Quasi-satellite temporary
2015 SO2	0.108	50–110	Črni Vrh Observatory	2015-09-21	Quasi-satellite	Horseshoe orbit temporary
2015 XX169	0.184	9–22	Mount Lemmon Survey	2015-12-09	Horseshoe orbit temporary	Horseshoe orbit temporary
2015 YA	0.279	9–22	Catalina Sky Survey	2015-12-16	Horseshoe orbit temporary	Horseshoe orbit temporary
2015 YQ1	0.404	7–16	Mount Lemmon Survey	2015-12-19	Horseshoe orbit temporary	Horseshoe orbit temporary
469219 Kamoʻoalewa	0.104	40–100	Pan-STARRS	2016-04-27	Quasi-satellite stable	Quasi-satellite stable
DN160822_03	?	?	?	2016-08-22	Possible temporary satellite	Destroyed
2020 CD3	0.017	1–6	Mount Lemmon Survey	2020-02-15	Temporary satellite	Apollo asteroid
2020 PN1	0.127	10–50	ATLAS-HKO	2020-08-12	Horseshoe orbit temporary	Horseshoe orbit temporary
2020 PP1	0.074	10–20	Pan-STARRS	2020-08-12	Quasi-satellite stable	Horseshoe orbit stable
(614689) 2020 XL5	0.387	1100–1260	Pan-STARRS	2020-12-12	Earth trojan	Earth trojan
2022 NX1	0.025	5–15	Moonbase South Observatory	2020-07-02	Temporary satellite	Apollo asteroid
2022 YG	0.196	16–30	Gennadiy Borisov	2022-12-15	Quasi-satellite	Quasi-satellite
2023 FW13	0.177	10–20	Pan-STARRS	2023-03-28	Quasi-satellite	Quasi-satellite
2024 PT5	0.021	7–13	ATLAS South Africa, Sutherland	2024-08-07	Temporary satellite	Apollo asteroid
2025 PN7	0.107	19–30	Pan-STARRS	2025-08-02	Quasi-satellite	Quasi-satellite
2026 QQ8	0.0261776	< 10	Krisztián Sárneczky	2026-08-20	Temporary satellite	Temporary satellite

== Artificial objects on temporary satellite orbits ==
The Earth can also temporarily capture defunct space probes or rockets travelling on solar orbits, in which case astronomers cannot always immediately determine whether the object is artificial or natural. The possibility of an artificial origin has been considered for both 2006 RH_{120} and 1991 VG.

The artificial origin has been confirmed in other cases. In September 2002, astronomers found an object designated J002E3. The object was on a temporary satellite orbit around Earth, leaving for a solar orbit in June 2003. Calculations showed that it was also on a solar orbit before 2002, but was close to Earth in 1971. J002E3 was identified as the third stage of the Saturn V rocket that carried Apollo 12 to the Moon. In 2006, an object designated 6Q0B44E was discovered on a temporary satellite orbit, later its artificial nature was confirmed, but its identity is unknown. Another confirmed artificial temporary satellite with unidentified origin is 2013 QW_{1}.

== See also ==
- Near-Earth object
- Horseshoe orbit
- Quasi-satellite
- EQUULEUS
