= 2022 UQ1 =

Mistakenly-given minor planet designation

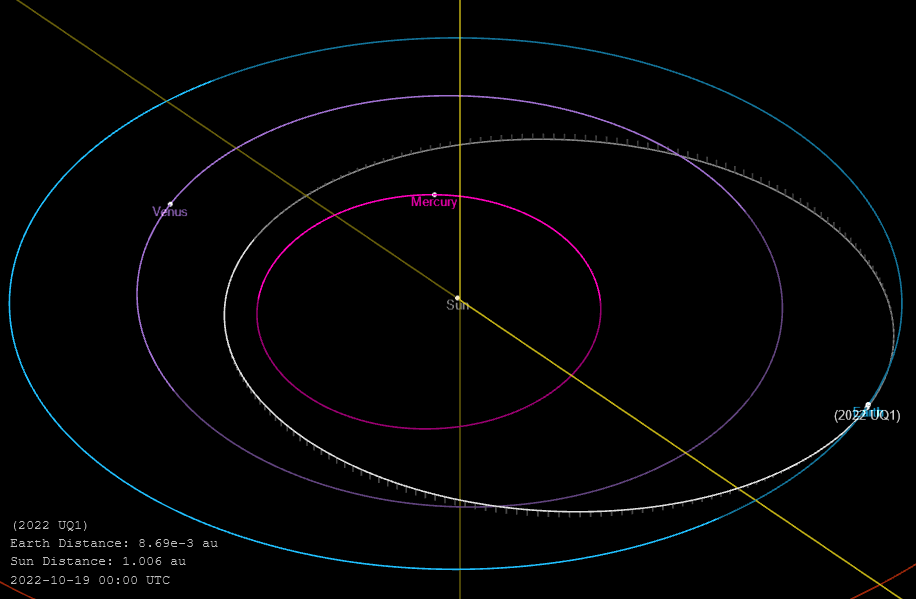
2022 UQ_{1}'s post-flyby orbit is between Mercury and the Earth.

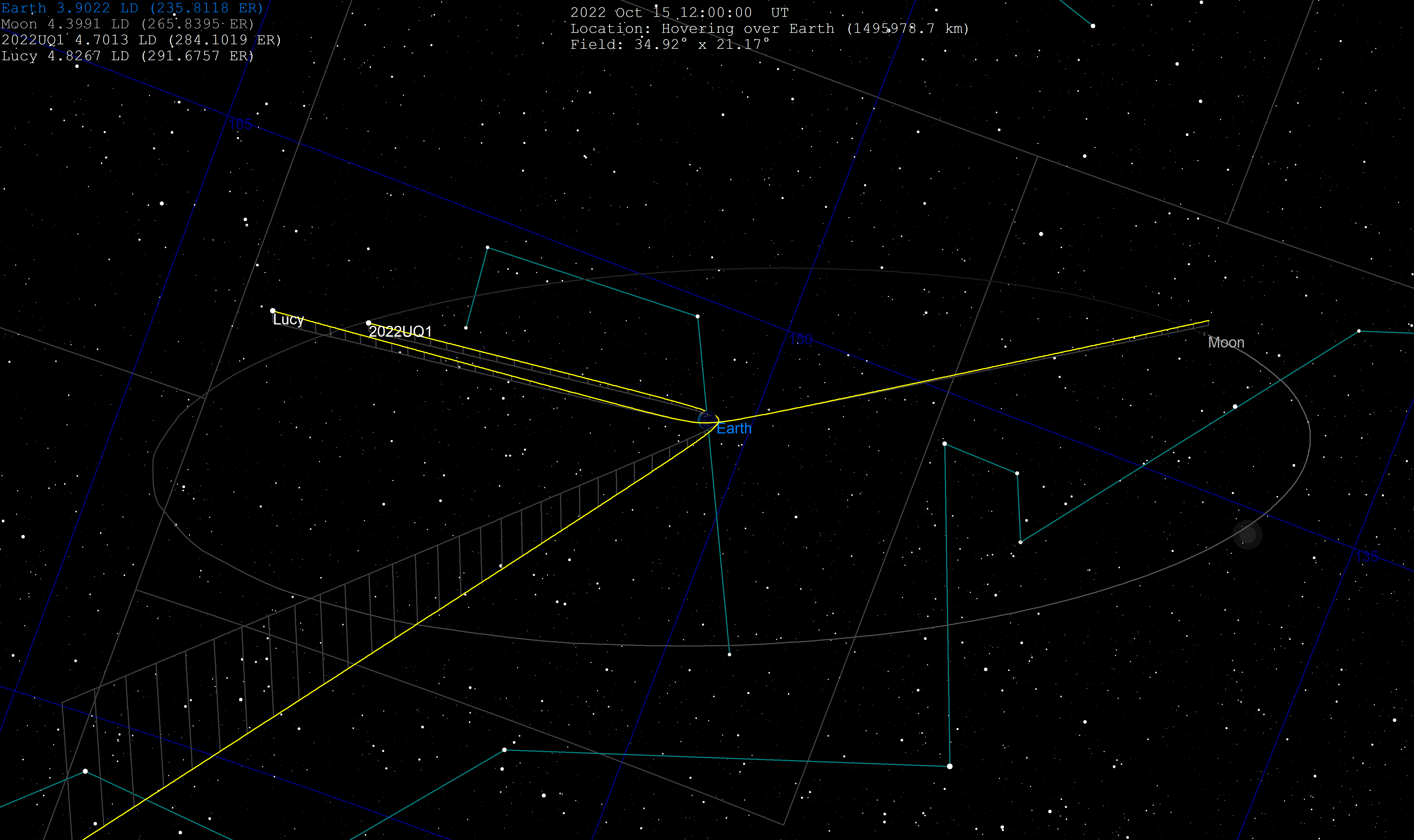
Flyby trajectories of the Lucy spacecraft compared to 2022 UQ_{1}

2022 UQ_{1} is a minor-planet provisional designation mistakenly given to the Lucy mission's Centaur upper-stage booster during its Earth gravity-assist flyby in October 2022. The object passed about 2,700 km (1,700 mi) above the surface of Earth (Note: Earth centerpoint approach distance of 9100 km – Earth radius of 6371 km = 2729 km from surface.) during its closest approach on 16 October 2022.

== History ==
Since 2022 UQ_{1} approached Earth from the direction of the Sun, it was not discovered until after its closest approach. On 18 October 2022, the object was discovered by one of the Asteroid Terrestrial-impact Last Alert System (ATLAS) telescopes in Rio Hurtado, Chile, which reported it to the Minor Planet Center (MPC) as a near-Earth object candidate.

On 19 October 2022, three other observatories produced follow-up observations and confirmed the object was on a near-Earth orbit, prompting the MPC to announce it as a new near-Earth object with the designation 2022 UQ_{1}.

On 20 October 2022, the object was later identified by Bill Gray and Davide Farnocchia as the Lucy mission's Centaur upper stage booster, resulting in the MPC deleting 2022 UQ_{1} from its database.

Animation of Lucy Centaur RB Booster around the Sun Lucy Centaur RB Booster · Sun · Earth · Venus · Mercury

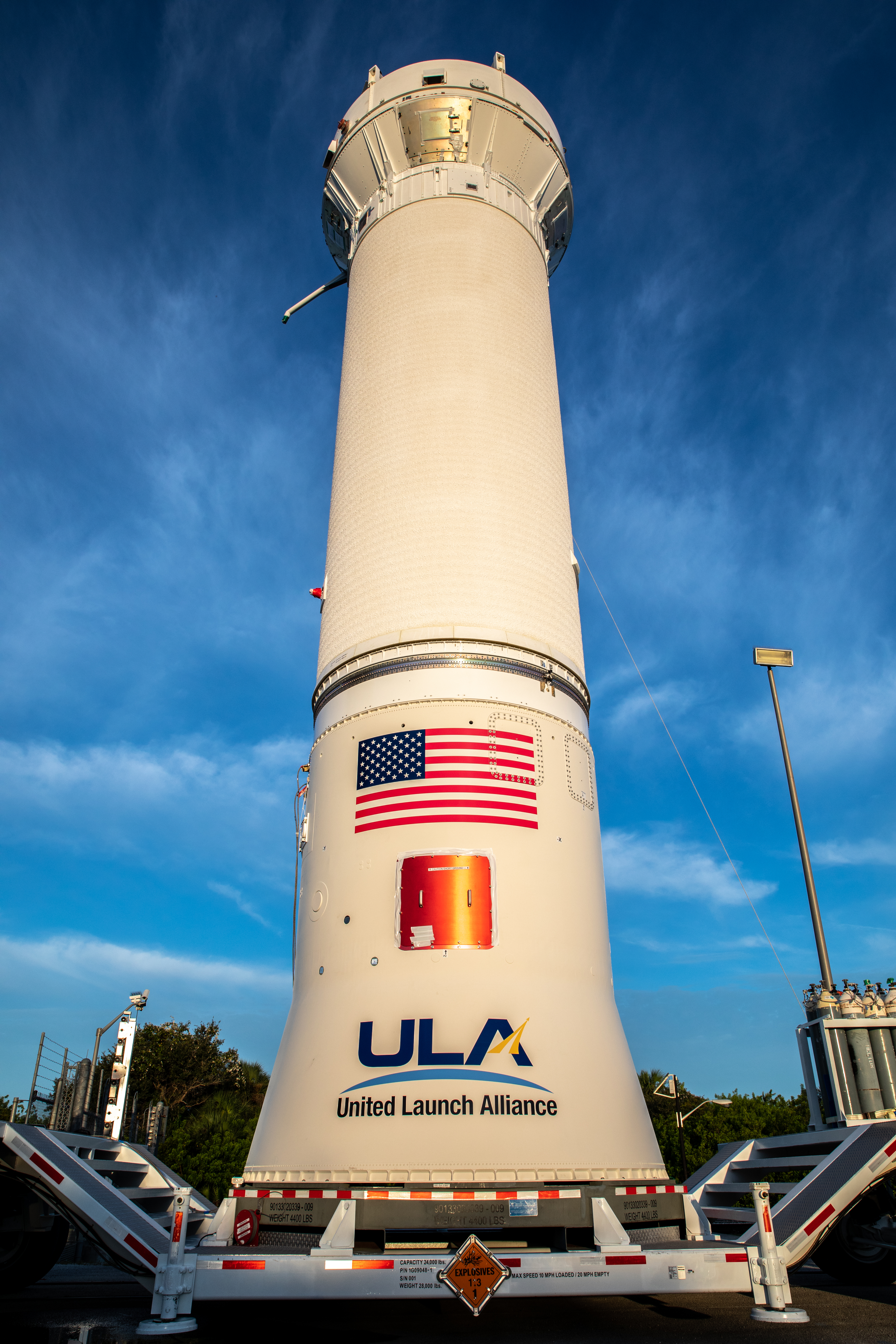
The Lucy mission's Centaur booster before launch

== Orbit ==
Lucy upper-stage booster's distance from the center of Earth on 16 October 2022
Date	ESA nominal geocentric distance (AU)	uncertainty region (1-sigma)
2022-10-16 06:54 ± 00:17 (Note: While the JPL Small-Body Database close approach table lists more inclusive (and thus larger) 3-sigma uncertainties, the European Space Agency close approach table lists more common 1-sigma uncertainties.)	0.0000609 AU (9,100 km)	±0.0000002 AU (30 km)

2022 UQ_{1} reached its perihelion on 27 July 2022, at a distance of 0.84 AU, between the orbits of Venus and Earth. The Earth encounter in October reduced the period of its heliocentric orbit from 1 year to about 241.5 days and reduced its perihelion to 0.52 AU, placing it between the orbits of Mercury and Venus.

Orbital Elements for October and November 2022 (before and after Earth encounter)
Parameter	Epoch	Period (p)	Aphelion (Q)	Perihelion (q)	Semi-major axis (a)	Inclination (i)	Eccentricity (e)
Units		(days)	AU			(°)	
	2022-Oct-01	365.72	1.1630	0.83870	1.0008	0.1271°	0.16201
	2022-Nov-01	241.23	0.9977	0.51906	0.7584	1.4283°	0.31557

== See also ==
- 2010 KQ
- 2020 SO
