= 2022 NX1 =

Temporary satellite capture

2022 NX_{1}
Discovery
- Discovered by: Moonbase South Observatory
- Discovery date: 2 July 2022

Designations
- Alternative designations: xkos033
- Minor planet category: Artificial?; NEO; Apollo; risk listed

Orbital characteristics
- Epoch 2023-Feb-25 (JD 2460000.5)
- Uncertainty parameter 1
- Observation arc: 142 days
- Aphelion: 1.04749104 AU (Q)
- Perihelion: 0.99635808 AU (q)
- Semi-major axis: 1.02192456 AU (a)
- Eccentricity: 0.02501797 (e) (Geocentric hyperbolic e=1.1)
- Orbital period (sidereal): 1.03308595 years
- Mean anomaly: 65.0876° (M)
- Inclination: 1.066697° (i)
- Longitude of ascending node: 274.76734° (Ω)
- Time of perihelion: 2022-Dec-18.7784
- Argument of perihelion: 169.58306° (ω)
- Earth MOID: 0.0120258 AU (1,799,030 km; 4.6801 LD)
- Jupiter MOID: 3.93788 AU (589,098,000 km)

Physical characteristics
- Dimensions: ~9 m (30 ft); 7–14 meters
- Absolute magnitude (H): 28.1

2022 NX_{1} is a near-Earth object roughly 10 meters (33 ft) in diameter discovered by Grzegorz Duszanowicz and Jordi Camarasa. The object orbits the Sun but makes slow close approaches to the Earth–Moon system. Between 11 June 2022 and 3 July 2022 (a period of 22 days) it passed within Earth's Hill sphere (roughly 0.01 AU (1.5 million km; 0.93 million mi)) at a low relative velocity and became temporarily captured by Earth's gravity, with a geocentric orbital eccentricity of less than 1 and negative geocentric orbital energy. Due to its Earth-like orbit, the object might be of artificial origin or lunar ejecta. However, visible spectroscopy obtained with the Gran Telescopio Canarias shows that it is an asteroid. The closest approach to Earth in 2022 was 26 June 2022 at roughly 812,200 km (504,700 mi) when it had a relative velocity of 0.96 km/s (2,100 mph). It was last near Earth around 16 January 1981 when it passed about 600,000 km (370,000 mi) from Earth. It will return as a temporary satellite in December 2051.

Entering and Exiting Geocentric Orbit (assuming the Earth+Asteroid are the only objects in the Solar System)
Epoch	Earth distance	Geocentric eccentricity	Apogee	Orbital period
2022-Jun-11	0.0077 AU (1.15 million km)	1.024	$\infty$	$\infty$
2022-Jun-12	0.0075 AU (1.12 million km)	0.997	3.6 AU (540 million km)	1,395.02 years (509,532 d)
2022-Jun-21	0.0058 AU (0.87 million km)	0.815	0.054 AU (8.1 million km)	2.92 years (1,067 d)
2022-Jul-02	0.0058 AU (0.87 million km)	0.987	0.82 AU (123 million km)	154.59 years (56,465 d)
2022-Jul-03	0.0059 AU (0.88 million km)	1.008	$\infty$	$\infty$

The object was discovered on 2 July 2022 by Moonbase South Observatory in Namibia when it had a deep Southern Hemisphere declination of –59° in the constellation of Pavo.

With a 56-day observation arc the object shows a 1.2% chance of impacting Earth between the years of 2075–2122. This asteroid experienced a temporarily captured flyby in 1981, had another one in 2022, and the current observation arc predicts it will become a mini-moon again in 2051.

The reflectance spectrum of 2022 NX_{1} suggests that its origin is not artificial and also that it is not lunar ejecta; it is also different from the V type of the only other mini-moon with available spectroscopy, 2020 CD3. The visible spectrum of 2022 NX_{1} is consistent with that of a K-type asteroid, although it could also be classified as an Xk type. Considering typical values of the similar albedo of both K-type and Xk-type asteroids and its absolute magnitude, 2022 NX_{1} may have a size range of 5 to 15 m.

== See also ==
- 1991 VG – near-Earth asteroid temporarily captured by Earth after its discovery in 1991
- 2006 RH120 – the first temporary Earth satellite discovered in situ 2006
- 2020 CD3 – another temporary Earth satellite discovered in 2020
- 2024 PT5 – another temporary Earth satellite discovered in 2024
- 2020 SO – a suspected near-Earth object identified as a rocket booster from the Surveyor 2 mission
