= 2010 KQ =

Space debris with spectral characteristics similar to a rocket body

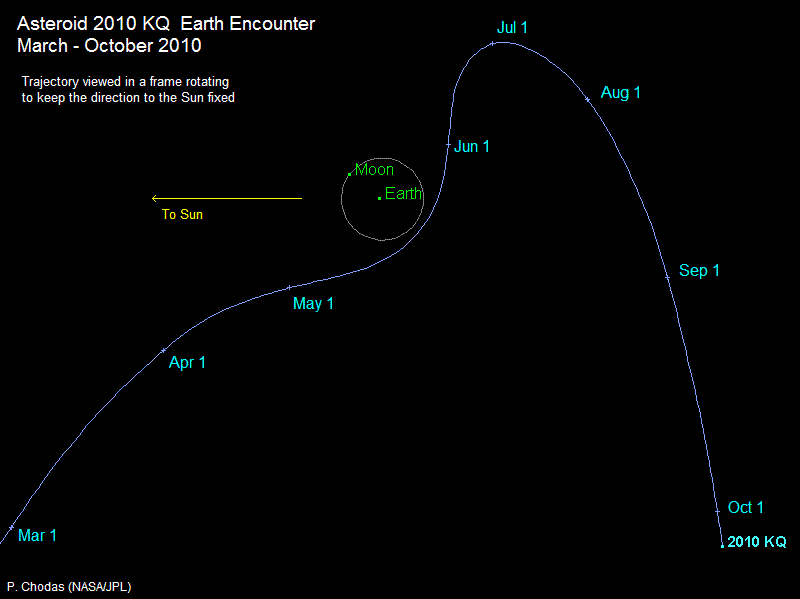
Asteroid 2010 KQ Earth Encounter (Source:NASA)

2010 KQ is a small asteroid-like object that has been discovered in an orbit about the Sun that is so similar to the Earth's orbit that scientists strongly suspect it to be a rocket stage that escaped years ago from the Earth–Moon system.

== History ==
The object was discovered on May 16, 2010 by Richard Kowalski at the Catalina Sky Survey, and has subsequently been observed by many observers, including Bill Ryan (Magdalena Ridge Observatory) and Peter Birtwhistle (England). It was given the asteroid designation 2010 KQ by the Minor Planet Center in Cambridge, Massachusetts, who identified its orbit as being very similar to that of the Earth.

Orbit refinements by JPL's Paul Chodas and amateur astronomer Bill Gray have shown that this object was very close to the Earth in early 1975, but the trajectory is not known with enough accuracy to associate the object with any particular launch. Nevertheless, scientists do not expect that a natural object could remain in this type of orbit for very long because of its relatively high impact probability with the Earth. In fact, an analysis carried out by Paul Chodas suggests that 2010 KQ has a 6% chance of impacting the Earth over a 30-year period starting in 2036.

Near-infrared spectral measurements of this object carried out by S.J. Bus (University of Hawaii) using the NASA IRTF telescope on Mauna Kea, Hawaii, indicate that its spectral characteristics do not match those of any of the known asteroid types, and in fact are similar to those of a rocket body. The object's absolute magnitude (28.9) also suggests that it is only a few meters in size, about the size of an upper stage. Additional observations over the coming months should allow scientists to discern how strongly solar radiation pressure affects the object's motion, a result that could help distinguish a solid, rocky asteroid from a lighter man-made object.

Astronomer Richard Miles believes 2010 KQ may be the 4th stage of the Russian Proton rocket from the Luna 23 mission, launched October 28, 1974.

Even in the unlikely event that this object is headed for impact with the Earth, whether it is an asteroid or rocket body, it is so small that it would disintegrate in the atmosphere and not cause harm on the ground.

== See also ==
- 2020 SO
- 2022 UQ1
