= 2006 RH120 =

Temporary satellite of Earth

2006 RH_{120}
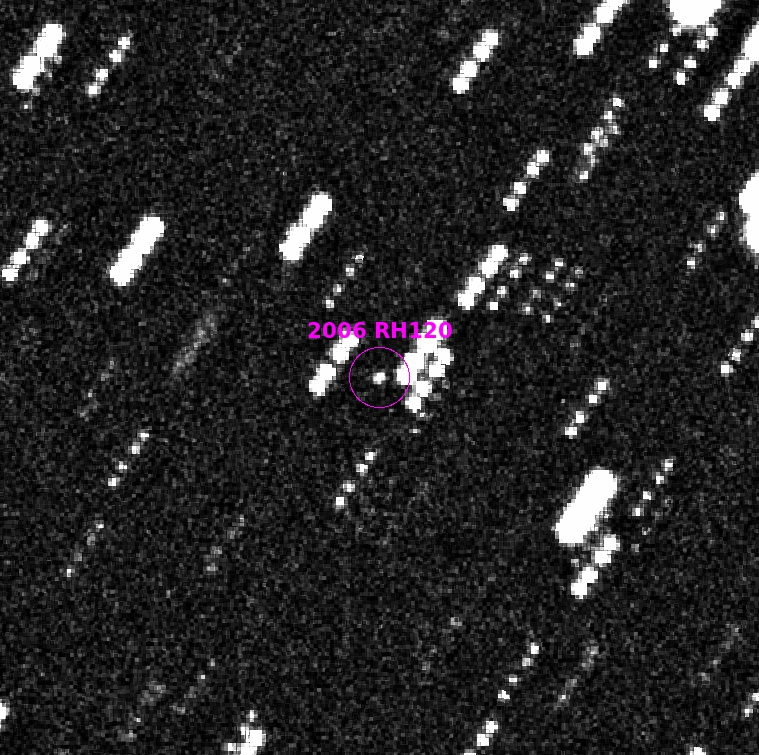
- 2006 RH_{120} from Mt. Lemmon Survey in December 2006

Discovery
- Discovered by: Catalina Sky Survey (Eric Christensen)
- Discovery date: 14 September 2006

Designations
- Alternative designations: 6R10DB9
- Minor planet category: Amor (MPC 2013); Apollo (JPL 2012); Aten (2007); (Temporary satellite of Earth 2006–2007)

Orbital characteristics
- Epoch 27 April 2019 (JD 2458600.5)
- Uncertainty parameter 1
- Observation arc: 281 days
- Earliest precovery date: 11 September 2006
- Aphelion: 1.058 AU (158.3 Gm) (Q)
- Perihelion: 1.0078 AU (150.76 Gm) (q)
- Semi-major axis: 1.0331 AU (154.55 Gm) (a)
- Eccentricity: 0.02452 (e)
- Orbital period (sidereal): 1.05 yr
- Mean anomaly: 313.7° (M)
- Inclination: 0.59486° (i)
- Longitude of ascending node: 51.18° (Ω)
- Time of perihelion: ~2028-Nov-11
- Argument of perihelion: 10.060° (ω)
- Earth MOID: 0.01682 AU (2,516,000 km)
- Jupiter MOID: 3.93 AU (588 Gm)

Physical characteristics
- Dimensions: ~2–3 m
- Synodic rotation period: 2.75 minutes; 0.04583 h (2.750 min)
- Geometric albedo: 0.1 ?
- Apparent magnitude: 30+ (until 2027)
- Absolute magnitude (H): 29.5

2006 RH_{120} is a tiny near-Earth asteroid and fast rotator with a diameter of approximately 2–3 meters that ordinarily orbits the Sun but makes close approaches to the Earth–Moon system around every twenty years, when it can temporarily enter Earth orbit through temporary satellite capture (TSC). Most recently, it was in Earth orbit from July 2006 to July 2007, during which time it was never more than 0.0116 AU (1.74 million km) from Earth. As a consequence of its temporary orbit around the Earth, it is currently the second smallest asteroid in the Solar System with a well-known orbit, after 2021 GM1. Until it was given a minor planet designation on 18 February 2008, the object was known as 6R10DB9, an internal identification number assigned by the Catalina Sky Survey.

== Discovery ==
2006 RH_{120} was discovered on 14 September 2006 by Eric Christensen with the 27-inch (690 mm) Schmidt camera of the Catalina Sky Survey in Arizona. "6R10DB9" was the Catalina Sky Survey's own discovery designation for this object, which usually would only be used on the Minor Planet Center's (MPC) Near-Earth Object Confirmation Page (NEOCP) until an International Astronomical Union (IAU) designation was applied, if the object was classified as a minor object. It was added on 14 September to the NEOCP and subsequently removed with the explanation that it "was not a minor planet". Preliminary orbital calculations indicated it was captured by Earth's gravity from solar orbit of a period of about 12 months, which is similar to that of many spent rocket boosters dating to the Apollo program of the 1960s and early 1970s. 6R10DB was assigned the designation 2006 RH_{120} on 18 February 2008. Precovery observations from Catalina Sky Survey, taken on 11 September 2006, were published on 31 July 2026 (almost twenty years later).

== Origin ==
Some controversy existed regarding the origin of the object. Upon discovery, it was not given a formal name because its spectrum was consistent with the white titanium-oxide paint used on Saturn V rockets, which meant it could be an artificial object. Precedents for this exist: J002E3 is currently thought to be the third-stage Saturn S-IVB booster from Apollo 12 and was in an almost identical orbit, and 6Q0B44E, discovered a month earlier, was also thought to be artificial. Its status as a satellite was also debated, with A. W. Harris of the Space Science Institute commenting, "Claiming some bit of fluff in a temporary looping orbit to be a 'satellite', with all the baggage that term carries, is mere hype". Radar observations strongly suggest that the object is a natural body.

== Orbit ==
Analysis has shown that solar-radiation pressure is perturbing its motion perceptibly. However, Paul Chodas in JPL's Solar System Dynamics Group suspects that the perturbations are consistent with expectations for a rocky object but not with old flight hardware. One hypothesis is that the object is a piece of lunar rock ejected by an impact. In 2023, 2006 RH_{120} was identified as a possible dark comet. Dark comets are asteroids that exhibit comet-like acceleration, but visually appear as asteroids, with no coma or tail. Astronomers who study dark comets believe the acceleration is caused by outgassing on the sunlit side.

2006 RH_{120} made four Earth orbits of about three months each with perigee (closest approach to Earth) on 11 September 2006, 3 January 2007, 25 March 2007, and 14 June 2007. During the 12-month capture from July 2006 to July 2007 when it was inside of Earth's Hill sphere, it stayed within 0.0116 AU (1.74 million km) of Earth. It was ejected after the 14 June 2007 perigee when it dipped inside the Moon's orbit to a distance of 276,840 kilometres (172,020 mi). 2006 RH_{120} became an Apollo-class asteroid in June 2007 as it was escaping Earth's Hill sphere. Though it was outside of Earth's Hill sphere, the geocentric orbital eccentricity was not greater than 1 until 17 September 2007.

It is now in solar orbit as an Amor-class asteroid with an orbit completely outside of Earth's orbit. As of 2022, this object is 1.7 AU from Earth on the other side of the Sun and was not less than 1 AU from Earth until March 2025.

=== Future events ===
Around 18 August 2028 (±3 days) it will pass Earth with a relative velocity of 136 m/s (300 mph) and will then pass Earth with a relative velocity of 784 m/s (1,750 mph) around 9 October 2028 as it speeds up for a November 2028 perihelion passage (closest approach to the Sun and when an object moves fastest in its orbit). For comparison, on 13 April 2029, asteroid 99942 Apophis will pass Earth at a relative speed of 7.4 km/s (17,000 mph).

2006 RH_{120} has a 1-in-120 (0.8%) chance of Earth impact on 8 February 2044 and would impact with a harmless 1.3 kiloton of energy if it did impact. (The Chelyabinsk meteor released about 440 kt of energy.) JPL Horizon's nominal orbit has the asteroid passing 0.009 AU (1.3 million km) from Earth on 9 January 2044 (30 days before the virtual impactor). As a result of a 281 day observation arc and radar observations, JPL's solution accounts for non-gravitational forces as the multi-decade motion of a very small object is greatly affected by solar radiation pressure and the Yarkovsky effect.

2044 Virtual impactor
Date	Impact probability (1 in)	JPL Horizons nominal geocentric distance (AU)	NEODyS nominal geocentric distance (AU)	MPC nominal geocentric distance (AU)	Find_Orb nominal geocentric distance (AU)	uncertainty region (3-sigma)
2044-02-08 09:07	200	0.014 AU (2.1 million km)	0.223 AU (33.4 million km)	0.10 AU (15 million km)	0.23 AU (34 million km)	± 130 million km

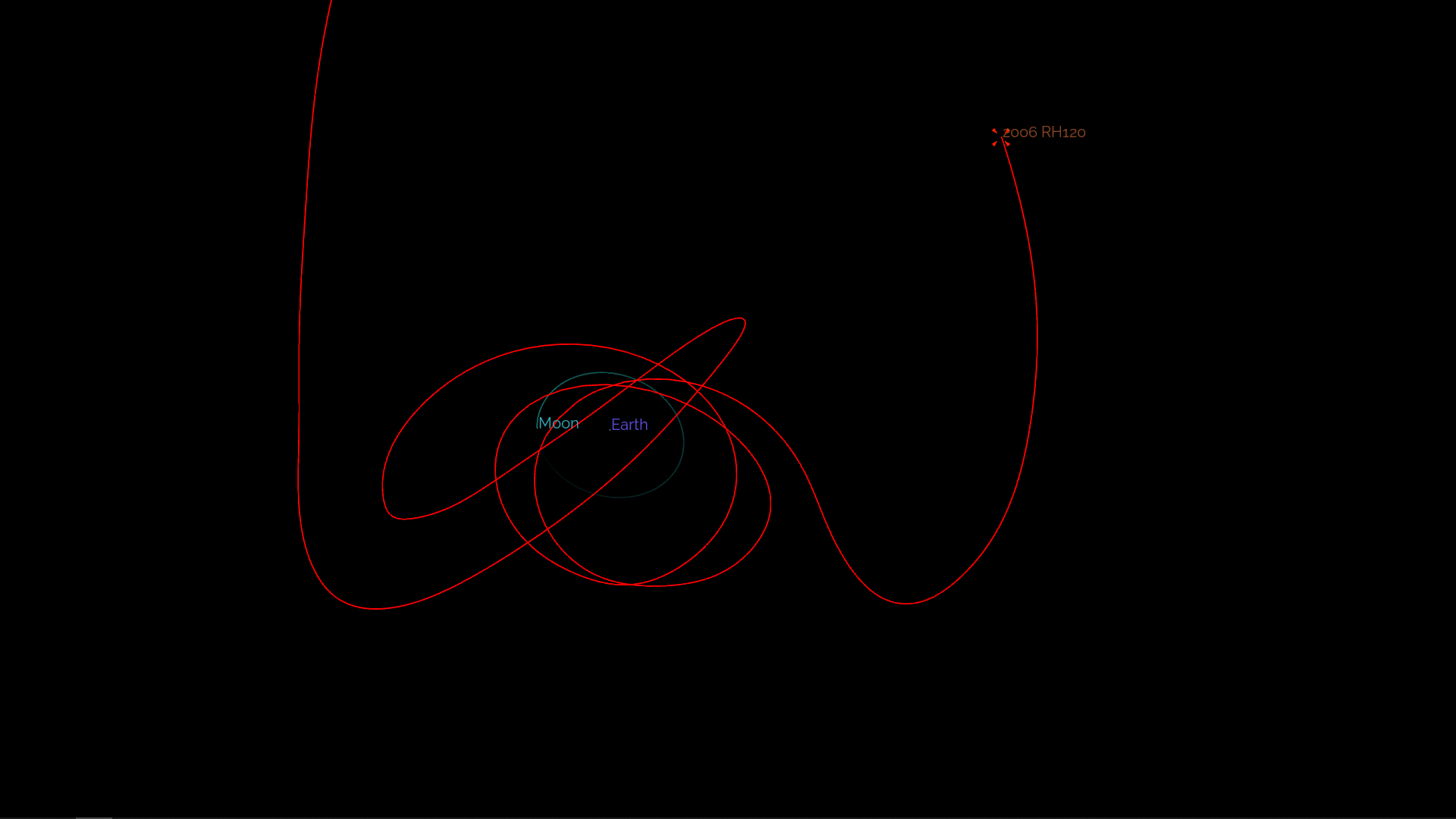
Orbit of 2006 RH_{120} during a temporary-satellite-capture event

Animation of 2006 RH_{120} orbit

Around Earth from April 2006 to November 2007

Around Earth from 1978 to 2020

Around Sun from 1600 to 2500

Sun · Earth · Moon · 2006 RH_{120}

== 14 June 2007 perigee ==
On 14 June 2007, 2006 RH_{120} made its fourth and last perigee of the most recent Earth encounter. It was 0.72 lunar distances at closest, with an apparent magnitude of 18.5–19.0. Astronomers at JPL Goldstone in California made radar astrometry measurements on 12, 14 and 17 June 2007.

2006 RH_{120} is listed as part of the Near-Earth Object Human Space Flight Accessible Targets Study (NHATS).

== See also ==
- 1991 VG – temporary Earth satellite discovered in 1991
- 2020 CD3 – another temporary Earth satellite discovered in 2020
- 2022 NX1 – another temporary Earth satellite discovered in 2022
- 2023 FY3 – another temporary Earth satellite discovered in 2023
- 2024 PT5 – another temporary Earth satellite discovered in 2024
- 6Q0B44E – small Earth satellite, probably artificial
- 3753 Cruithne – horseshoe companion of the Earth
- 2002 AA29 – horseshoe companion of the Earth
- (419624) 2010 SO16 – horseshoe companion of the Earth
- Natural satellite
- Claimed moons of Earth
- Quasi-satellite
- Space debris
- Dark comet
