= Kacper Wierzchoś =

Polish astronomer

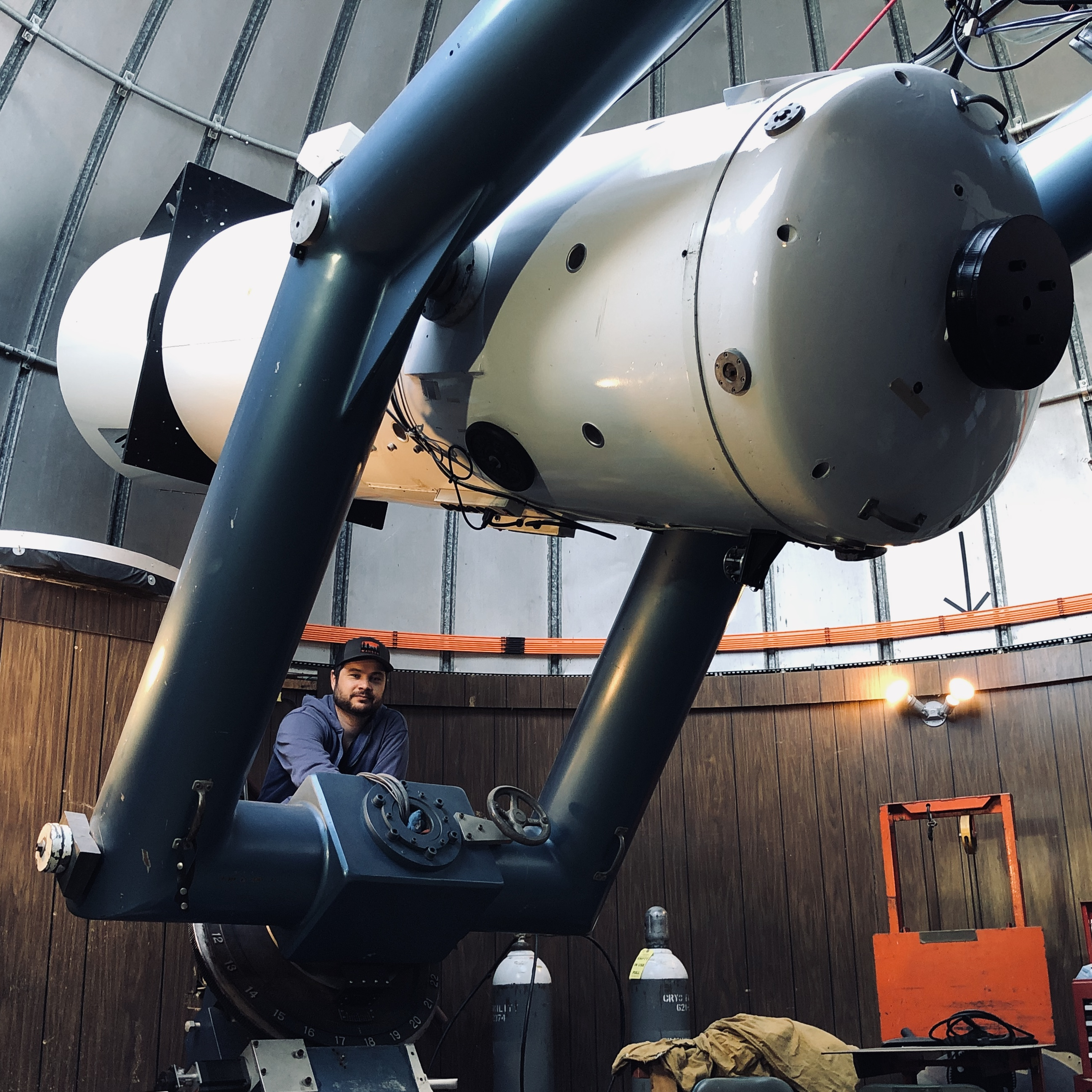
- Employer: University of Arizona

Kacper Wierzchoś (born 1988, Lublin, Poland) is a Polish astronomer.

== Biography ==
He is the son of Jacek Wierzchoś, chemist, and former employee of the Polish Academy of Sciences, and Janina Wierzchoś, dentist. In the early 1990s, his family immigrated to Spain, where he graduated in physics from the Complutense University of Madrid. In 2019, he defended his doctorate, concerning comets, at the University of South Florida. He currently works at the Mount Lemmon Survey observatory as part of the Catalina Sky Survey project.

In this context, he discovered several asteroids. In particular, along with Theodore Pruyne he co-discovered 2020 CD_{3} on 15 February 2020, then a temporary satellite of Earth. In April of the same year, he discovered a long-period comet, which consequently bears his name: C/2020 H3 (Wierzchoś). In September 2021, he discovered his second comet, periodic comet: P/2021 R4 (Wierzchoś). Other comets discovered by him include: P/2021 U1 (Wierzchos), P/2022 B1 (Wierzchos), C/2024 E1 (Wierzchos) and C/2024 G1 (Wierzchos).

He is married and lives with his wife in Tucson, Arizona. He speaks Polish, Spanish, English and Catalan.

The asteroid 594782 Kacperwierzchoś bears his name.

== Discoveries ==
=== Asteroids ===
On 15 February 2020, together with Theodor Pruyne, he discovered the asteroid 2020 CD_{3}, a temporary satellite of Earth. On 13 November 2021, he discovered the asteroid 2021 VN22.

=== Comets ===
In April 2020, he discovered a long-period comet that was named after him – C/2020 H3 (Wierzchos). In September 2021, he discovered his second comet – P/2021 R4 (Wierzchos). The third comet – P/2021 U1 (Wierzchos) was discovered by him in October 2021, the fourth – P/2022 B1 (Wierzchos) in January 2022, and the fifth one – C/2024 E1 (Wierzchos) in 2024.
