= James V. Scotti =

American astronomer (born 1960)

- Born: James Vernon Scotti; 1960 (age 64–65); Bandon, Oregon, U.S.
- Education: Edmonds Woodway High School; University of Arizona (BSc)
- Occupation: Astronomer

James Vernon Scotti (born 1960) is an American astronomer. He was born in Bandon, Oregon, and graduated from Edmonds Woodway High School in Edmonds, Washington in 1978. He received his B.Sc. in Astronomy from the University of Arizona in Tucson in 1983. Ever since that time, he has worked on the Spacewatch project, which is one of a number of projects that look for near-Earth asteroids (NEAs). He wrote the first automatic asteroid detection software for the project in 1984.

== Discoveries ==
He has discovered numerous near-Earth asteroids, including (496816) 1989 UP, which briefly created a stir in the news media when a preliminary orbit calculation indicated the possibility of Earth impact in 2028; further observations led to a more accurate orbit, which disproved the impact. In 1991, he discovered 1991 VG, a Near-Earth object with some unusual characteristics. In 2013, he discovered 2013 BS45, another NEO that moves in a low eccentricity and low inclination orbit.

He has also recovered more than 75 comets starting in 1985 (since comets are subject to non-gravitational forces due to outgassing and solar wind, it is often a challenge to predict their exact position and rediscover them each time they make a new perihelion approach). He confirmed the discovery of the well known Comet Shoemaker-Levy 9, which impacted Jupiter in July 1994. He has also discovered the periodic comets 202P/Scotti, 244P/Scotti, 377P/Scotti, P/2010 C1 (Scotti), P/2010 H4 (Scotti), P/2010 H5 (Scotti), P/2011 A2 (Scotti), P/2013 A2 (Scotti), and P/2015 Q1 (Scotti); the later six are not yet numbered as they have only been seen at one perihelion passage. He has also discovered non-periodic comets C/2010 E5 (Scotti) and C/2010 F3 (Scotti).

Scotti's research interests include the origin of comets, the dynamical evolution of comets and asteroids, the near-Earth asteroids, and the outer Solar System.

Scotti is also an avid space enthusiast and is interested in the history of space exploration and particularly of the Apollo Program. He has contributed to the Apollo Lunar Surface Journal, which details the Apollo lunar explorations. He is also a space artist and photographer.

== Awards and honors ==
Asteroid 3594 Scotti, discovered by Edward Bowell at Anderson Mesa Station in 1983, was named in his honor. The official naming citation was published by the Minor Planet Center on September 7, 1987 (M.P.C. 12211).

== See also ==
- Lunar and Planetary Laboratory
- Near-Earth object
- J002E3
- 2000 SG344
