= Luna 23 =

Failed Soviet lunar sample return mission

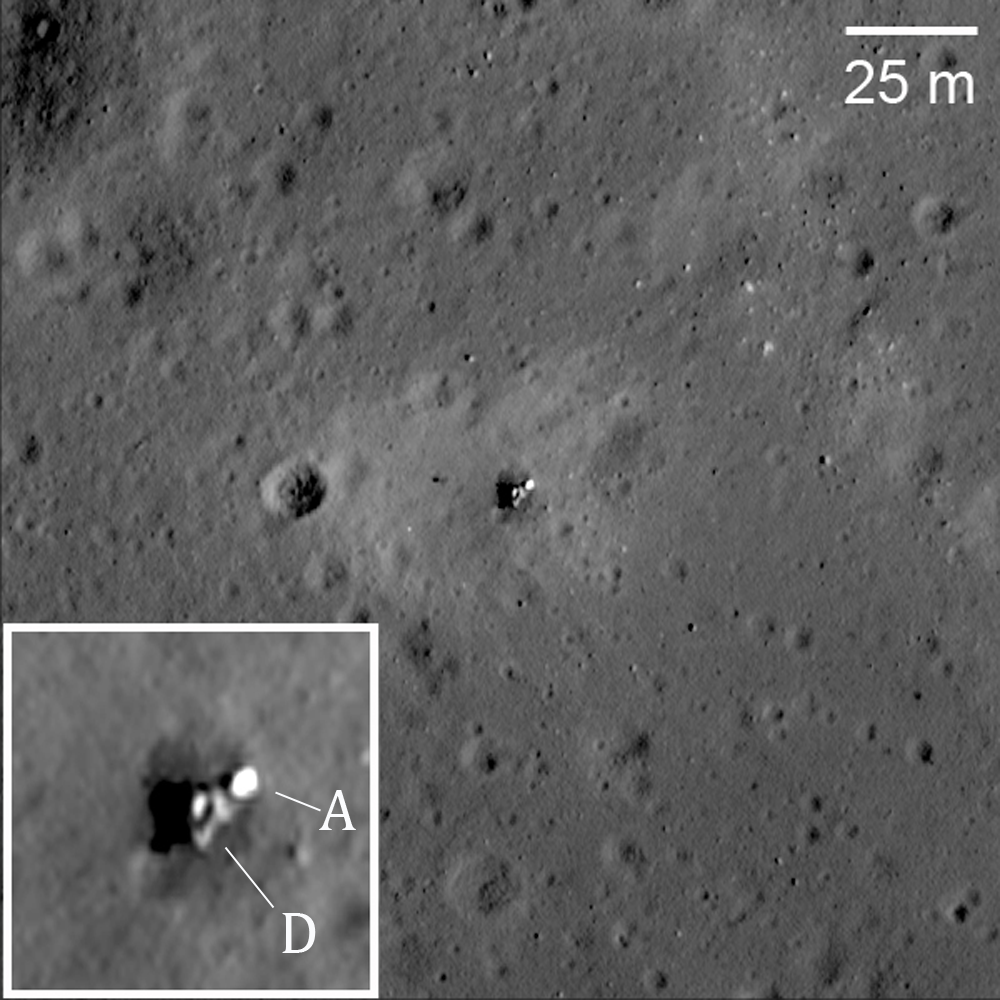
- Image of Luna 23 lying horizontally on the lunar surface. A: Ascent Stage, D: Descent Stage.
- Mission type: Lunar sample return
- Operator: Soviet space program
- COSPAR ID: 1974-084A
- SATCAT no.: 7491
- Mission duration: 12 days

Spacecraft properties
- Bus: Ye-8-5M
- Manufacturer: GSMZ Lavochkin
- Launch mass: 5,795 kg (12,776 lb)
- Dry mass: 5,600 kg (12,300 lb)

Start of mission
- Launch date: 28 October 1974, 14:30:32 UTC
- Rocket: Proton-K/D
- Launch site: Baikonur 81/24

End of mission
- Last contact: 9 November 1974

Orbital parameters
- Reference system: Selenocentric
- Eccentricity: 0.00272
- Periselene altitude: 94 km (58 mi)
- Aposelene altitude: 104 km (65 mi)
- Inclination: 138 degrees
- Period: 119 minutes
- Epoch: 2 November 1974

Lunar orbiter
- Orbital insertion: 2 November 1974
- Orbits: ~48

Lunar lander
- Landing date: 6 November 1974
- Landing site: 12.6669°N 62.1511°E

Instruments
- Stereo photographic imaging system Improved Drill/Remote arm for sample collection Radiation detector Radio-altimeter

Luna 23 was an uncrewed space mission of the Luna program developed by the Soviet Union.

== Overview ==
Luna 23 was a Soviet Moon lander mission which was intended to return a lunar sample to Earth. Launched to the Moon by a Proton-K/D, the spacecraft tipped over on its side and was damaged upon landing in Mare Crisium. The sample collecting apparatus could not operate and no samples were returned. The lander continued transmissions for three days after landing. In 1976, Luna 24 landed several hundred meters away and successfully returned samples. The asteroid-like object 2010 KQ is believed to be a rocket that parted the Luna 23 module after launch.

Luna 23 was the first modified lunar sample return spacecraft, designed to return a deep core sample of the Moon's surface (hence the change in index from Ye-8-5 to Ye-8-5M). While Luna 16 and Luna 20 had returned samples from a depth of 0.3 meters, the new spacecraft was designed to dig to 2.5 meters. After a midcourse correction on 31 October, Luna 23 entered orbit around the Moon on 2 November 1974. Parameters were 104 × 94 kilometers at 138° inclination. Following several more changes to the orbit, the spacecraft descended to the lunar surface on 6 November and landed in the southernmost portion of Mare Crisium. Landing coordinates were 13° north latitude and 62° east longitude. During landing in "unfavorable" terrain, the lander's drilling device was evidently damaged, preventing fulfillment of the primary mission, the return of lunar soil to Earth. Scientists devised a makeshift plan to conduct a limited science exploration program with the stationary lander. Controllers maintained contact with the spacecraft until 9 November 1974.

High resolution orbital photographs taken by the NASA Lunar Reconnaissance Orbiter and released in March 2012 showed the Luna 23 spacecraft lying on its side on the lunar surface. The spacecraft evidently tipped over upon landing, perhaps due to higher than nominal vertical and/or horizontal velocities at touchdown.

== In culture ==
In the 2007 BioWare video game Mass Effect, derelict remains of this spacecraft can be found in the accessible parts of Earth's Moon and can be salvaged for random materials.

== See also ==
- Timeline of artificial satellites and space probes
- List of artificial objects on the Moon
- List of missions to the Moon
