= C/2024 E1 (Wierzchoś) =

Oort cloud comet

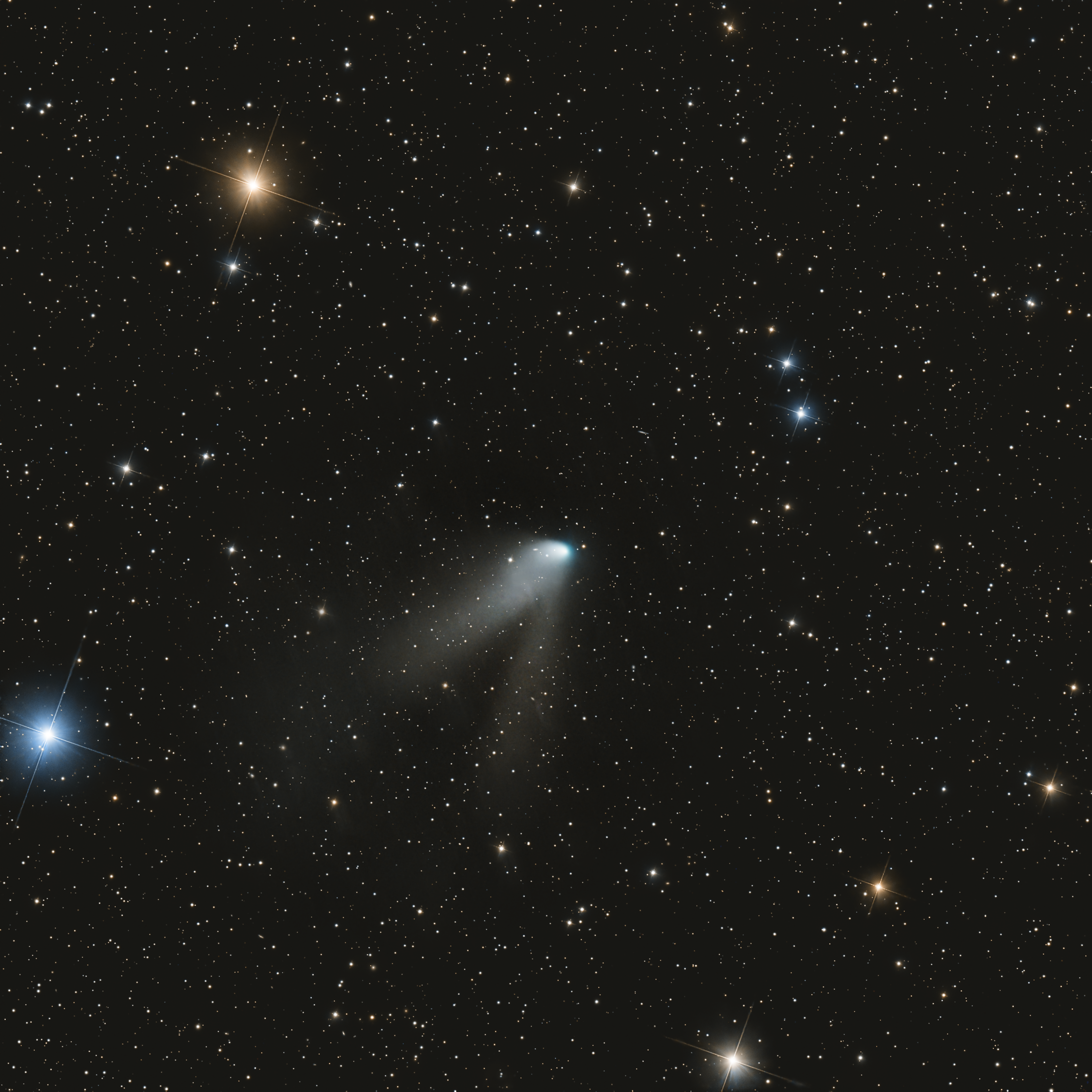
- Comet Wierzchoś with a split tail as it exits the inner solar system on 13 March 2026

Discovery
- Discovered by: Kacper W. Wierzchoś
- Discovery site: Mount Lemmon Obs.
- Discovery date: 3 March 2024

Designations
- Alternative designations: CK24E010

Orbital characteristics
- Epoch: 12 May 2025 (JD 2460807.5)
- Observation arc: 2.16 years (Note: Observation arc from the Minor Planet Center database covering dates from 15 February 2024 until 16 April 2026.)
- Earliest precovery date: 15 February 2024
- Number of observations: 3,705 (Note: For the orbital calculations of this comet, only 2,233 observations were used.)
- Aphelion: ≈43000 AU (inbound)
- Perihelion: 0.5661 AU (85 million km)
- Semi-major axis: ≈22000 AU (inbound)
- Eccentricity: 0.99997 (inbound); 0.9999999 (outbound)
- Orbital period: ≈3 million years (inbound) ejection (outbound) (Note: There is a very small difference in energy between a near-parabolic orbit of 200000 years and an ejection trajectory. Orbital periods of billions of years are basically ejection trajectories. At the epoch of 2200, the comet will have a near parabolic eccentricity of 0.9999999 with an unrealistic aphelion of 11,000,000 AU (170 ly).)
- Max. orbital speed: 56 km/s (Note: Mercury has an orbital speed of 48 km/s.)
- Inclination: 75.239°
- Longitude of ascending node: 108.08°
- Argument of periapsis: 243.64°
- Mean anomaly: -0.00025°
- Last perihelion: 20 January 2026
- T_{Jupiter}: 0.238
- Earth MOID: 0.1990 AU
- Jupiter MOID: 1.90 AU

Physical characteristics
- Mean radius: 2–10 km (1.2–6.2 mi)
- Comet total magnitude (M1): 11.7±0.7
- Comet nuclear magnitude (M2): 11.9±0.3
- Apparent magnitude: 13 (26 March 2026)

C/2024 E1 (Wierzchoś) is a hyperbolic Oort cloud comet, discovered on 3 March 2024 by Polish astronomer Kacper Wierzchoś. It reached perihelion on 20 January 2026, with an apparent magnitude of around +6.5, visible in larger binoculars. It has a highly eccentric orbit, with an inbound orbital period of millions of years and an outbound ejection trajectory. Cometary emission activity for C/2024 E1 has been driven by carbon dioxide (CO_{2}).

== Observational history ==
=== Discovery ===
During a routine Mt. Lemmon survey (G96) search on 3 March 2024, one of the scientists participating in the project, Kacper Wierzchoś, spotted a moving object in four 30-second–exposure images taken using an f/1.6 1.5 m (59 in) Cassegrain telescope, equipped with a 111.5 megapixel (10,560 x 10,560 pixel) CCD. It appeared as a 20th-magnitude object in the constellation Draco, (Note: Reported initial position upon discovery was: α = 17^{h} 19^{m} 12.26^{s}, δ = 55° 07′ 02.0″) about 2 degrees north of the star ν Dra. After the discovery announcement, the Zwicky Transient Facility reported that they obtained precovery images of the comet between 15 and 29 February 2024. The comet was reported to have a condensed coma about 4 arcseconds in diameter and a tail about 6 arcseconds long. It is the fifth comet discovered by Kacper Wierzchoś. (Note: As of 2025, Wierzchoś discovered six other comets. These were; C/2020 H3, P/2021 R4, P/2021 U1, P/2022 B1, C/2024 G1 and C/2024 J2.)

=== Follow-up observations ===
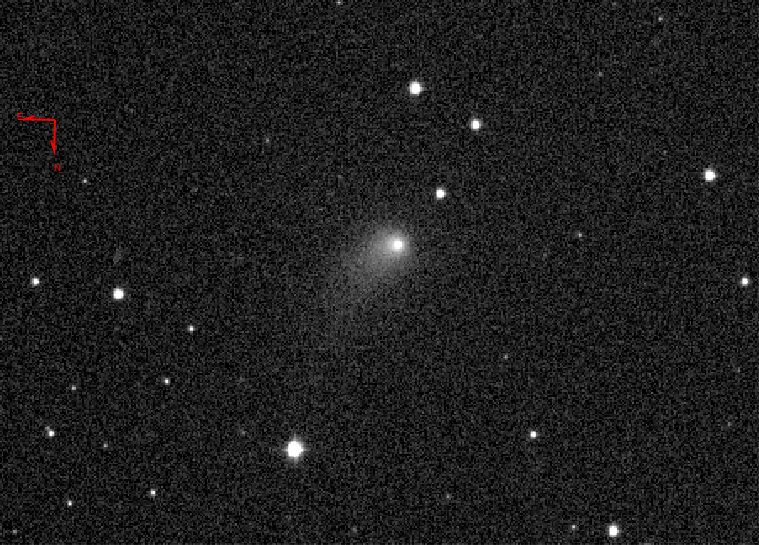
Comet Wierzchoś photographed from the Zwicky Transient Facility on 14 September 2025

C/2024 E1 (Wierzchoś) was observed by the James Webb Space Telescope at a distance of 7.0 AU (1.05 billion km) from the Sun in early 2025, measuring its spectra and dust production rates in infrared light. There were no emission features for carbon monoxide (CO) as the comet may have lost its near-surface CO early in its evolution before being ejected to the Oort Cloud. The activity was driven by carbon dioxide (CO_{2}).

When first discovered the comet was expected to brighten to apparent magnitude 5, near the naked-eye limit, but later calculations predicted the brightest apparent magnitude to reach only 8.5, 25 times fainter than original expectations. By 25 August 2025, the comet was 2.64 AU (395 million km) from both the Sun and Earth. It crossed the celestial equator on 17 November 2025. The comet passed about 2.3 degrees southwest near the globular cluster Messier 14 as seen from the night sky by 26 November 2025.

=== Around perihelion ===
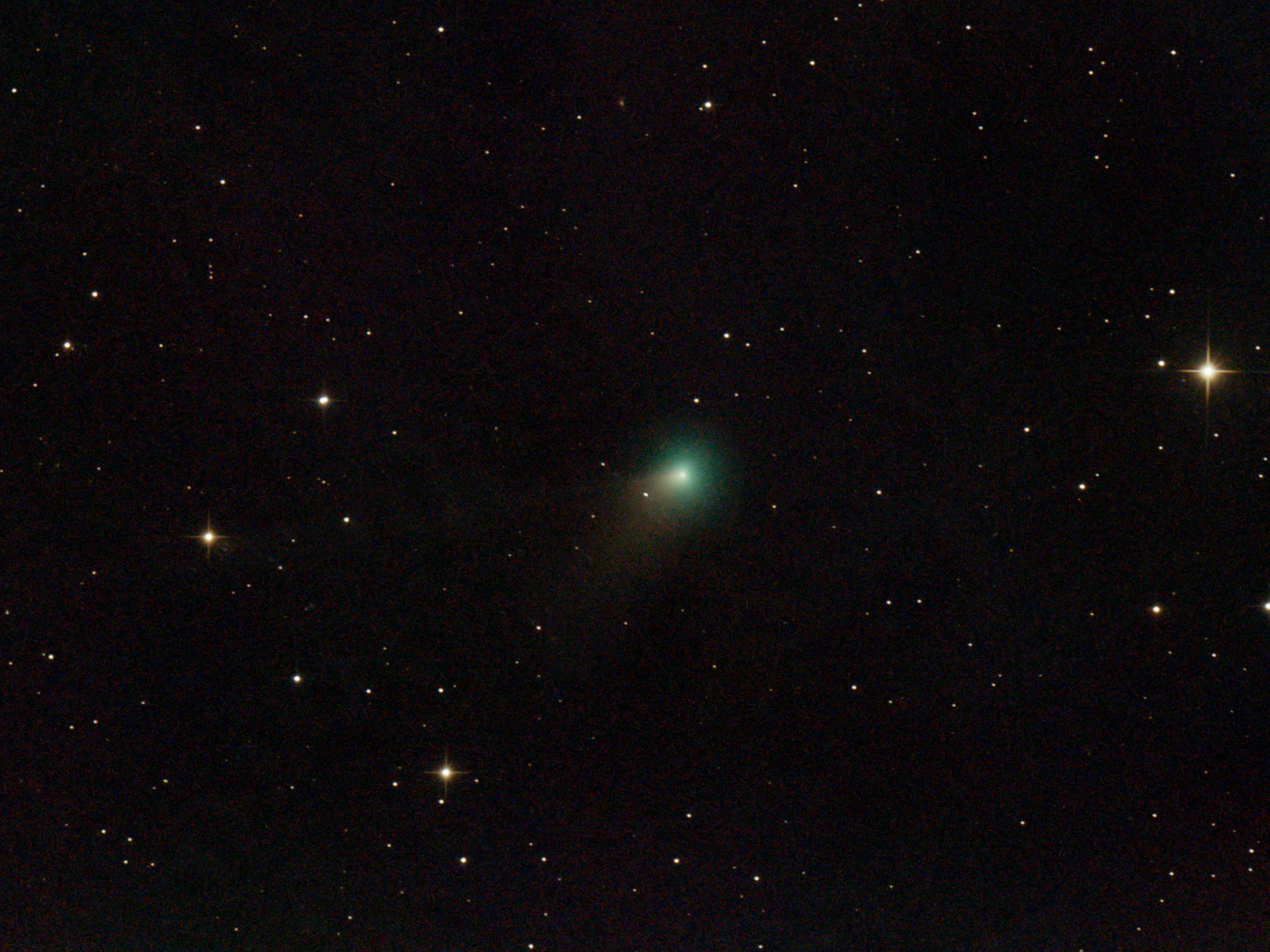
The comet on 24 February 2026

The comet came to perihelion on 20 January 2026 around 18:27 UT at 0.566 AU (85 million km) from the Sun. It was about 22 degrees from the Sun and was visible from the Southern Hemisphere. Peak brightness was estimated to be around 8.5 magnitude, meaning it could be visible through larger binoculars or a modest telescope. It was about 1.352 AU (202.3 million km; 125.7 million mi) from Earth during perihelion.

It passed 0.191 AU (29 million km; 18 million mi) from Venus on 1 January 2026 and passed 1.0 AU from Earth on 17 February 2026. After its perihelion and solar conjunction, the comet was observed on 23 January 2026 having an estimated apparent magnitude of 6.8. On January 26, its coma had an estimated diameter of 3 arcminutes and its tail was one degree long. In mid February the comet featured a thin ion tail 3 degrees long and three distinct dust tails spanning near 90 degrees.

=== Disintegration ===
The comet brightened slightly between February 28 and March 6 and afterwards its magnitude declined quickly, by 0.2 to 0.3 magnitudes per day, and in images obtained on March 12 by Lowell Discovery Telescope it lacked a central condensation when 1.2 AU (180 million km) from the Sun.

The orbital eccentricity is slightly greater than 1 at the JPL SBDB epoch 2025 solution as the comet is inside of the planetary region of the Solar System and subject to ongoing planetary perturbations. With a future orbital eccentricity of 1.000004, the comet may have just enough energy to leave the Solar System.

== Physical characteristics ==
Initial estimates of the radius of its nucleus in September 2025 determined an upper limit of approximately 13.7 km (8.5 mi). Follow-up studies in October 2025 based on its CO_{2} production rate revised the estimate to around 2–10 km (1.2–6.2 mi), most likely indicating that it is much smaller than previously thought.

Long-slit spectroscopy of the comet showed that C/2024 E1 is a dust-rich comet, where the mass loss observed is dominated by refractory components rather than volatiles.
