= 2020 CD3 =

Temporary satellite of Earth

2020 CD_{3}
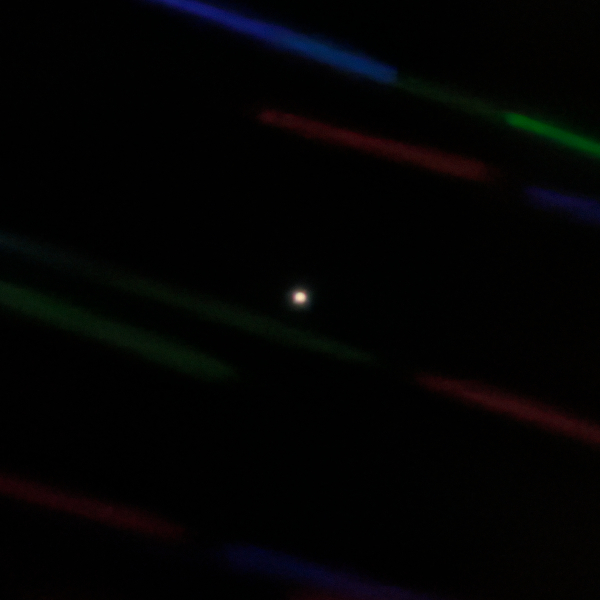
- 2020 CD_{3} imaged in colour by Gemini North

Discovery
- Discovered by: Mt. Lemmon Survey: Theodore A. Pruyne; Kacper W. Wierzchoś
- Discovery site: Mt. Lemmon Obs. (CSS)
- Discovery date: 15 February 2020

Designations
- Alternative designations: C26FED2
- Minor planet category: NEO · Arjuna · Apollo temporarily captured · co-orbital

Orbital characteristics
- Epoch 2022-Aug-09 (JD 2459800.5)
- Uncertainty parameter 0
- Observation arc: 2.03 yr (742 days)
- Earliest precovery date: 9 May 2018
- Aphelion: 1.0418 AU
- Perihelion: 1.0162 AU
- Semi-major axis: 1.029 AU
- Eccentricity: 0.01245 (Geocentric hyperbolic e=58901)
- Orbital period (sidereal): 1.04 yr (381.25 d)
- Mean anomaly: 151.09°
- Mean motion: 0° 56^{m} 40.373^{s} / day
- Inclination: 0.63407°
- Longitude of ascending node: 82.211°
- Argument of perihelion: 49.972°
- Earth MOID: 0.0212 AU (3.17 million km; 8.3 LD)

Physical characteristics
- Mean diameter: 0.9±0.1 m (albedo of 0.35); 1.2±0.1 m (albedo of 0.23)
- Mass: ~4,900 kg (est.)
- Mean density: 2.1±0.7 g/cm^{3}
- Synodic rotation period: 1,146.8 s or 19.114 min (double-peaked solution); 573.4 s (single-peaked solution)
- Geometric albedo: 0.35 (assumed V-type); 0.23 (assumed from main belt)
- Spectral type: V B–V=0.90±0.07; V–R=0.46±0.08; R–I=0.44±0.06
- Apparent magnitude: >30 (current); 20 (at discovery)
- Absolute magnitude (H): 31.80±0.34; 31.8

2020 CD_{3}, or CD3 for short, is a tiny near-Earth asteroid (or minimoon) that ordinarily orbits the Sun and makes close approaches to the Earth–Moon system, in which it can temporarily enter Earth orbit through temporary satellite capture (TSC). It was discovered at the Mount Lemmon Observatory by astronomers Theodore Pruyne and Kacper Wierzchoś on 15 February 2020, as part of the Mount Lemmon Survey or Catalina Sky Survey. The asteroid's discovery was announced by the Minor Planet Center on 25 February 2020, after subsequent observations confirmed that it was orbiting Earth.

It is the second temporary satellite of Earth discovered in situ, after 2006 RH120, which was discovered in 2006. Based on its nominal trajectory, 2020 CD_{3} was captured by Earth around 2016–2017, and escaped Earth's gravitational sphere of influence around 7 May 2020. 2020 CD_{3} will make another close pass to Earth in March 2044, though it will most likely not be captured by Earth due to the greater approach distance.

2020 CD_{3} has an absolute magnitude around 32, indicating that it is very small in size. Assuming that 2020 CD_{3} has a low albedo characteristic of dark, carbonaceous C-type asteroids, its diameter is probably around 1.9–3.5 metres (6–11 ft). 2020 CD_{3} is classified as an Arjuna asteroid, a subtype of small Earth-crossing Apollo asteroids that have Earth-like orbits.

== Discovery ==
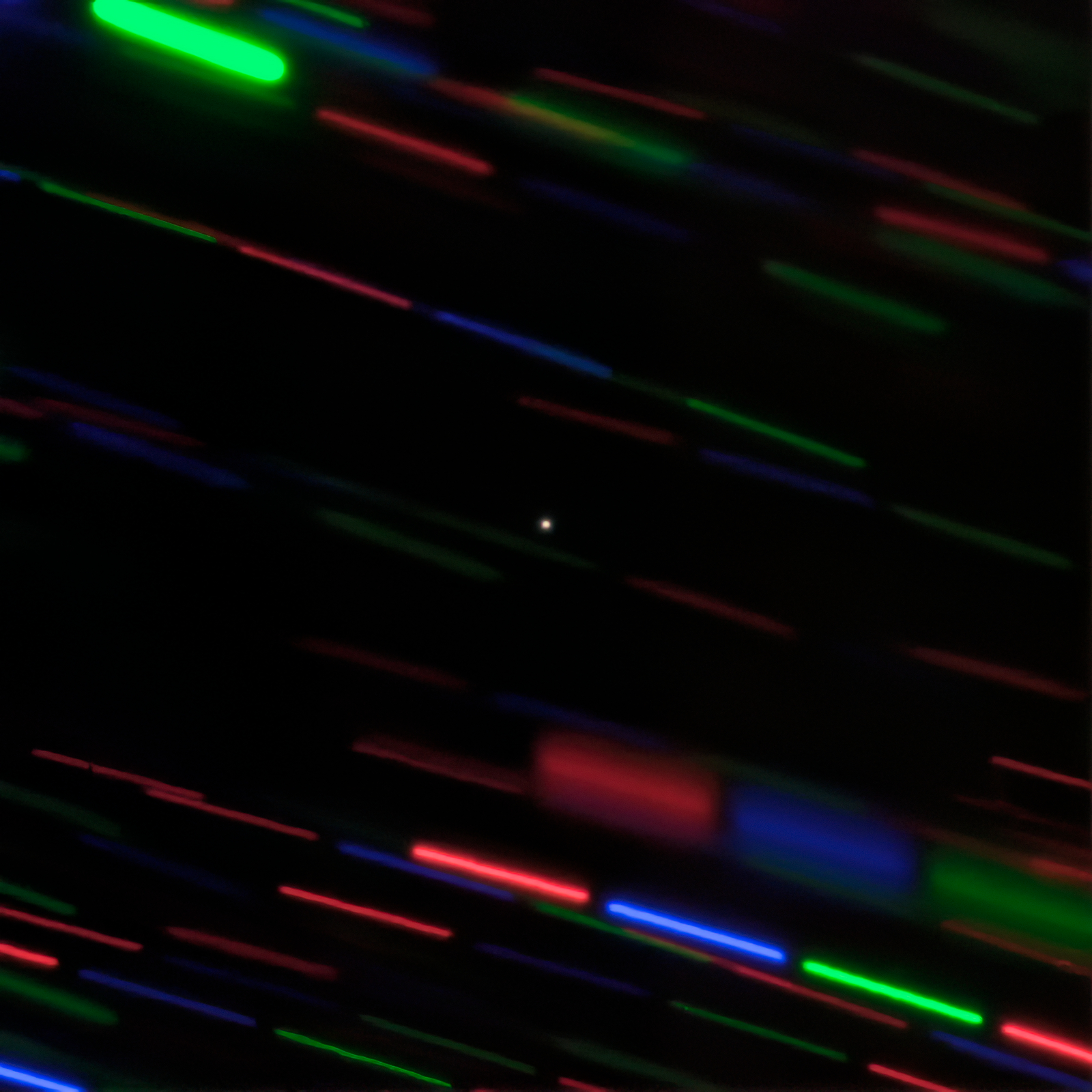
Colour composite image of 2020 CD_{3} obtained by the Gemini Observatory on 24 February 2020

2020 CD_{3} was discovered on 15 February 2020, by astronomers Theodore Pruyne and Kacper Wierzchoś at the Mount Lemmon Observatory. The discovery formed part of the Mount Lemmon Survey designed for discovering near-Earth objects, which is also part of the Catalina Sky Survey conducted at Tucson, Arizona. 2020 CD_{3} was found as a faint, 20th magnitude object in the constellation of Virgo, located about 0.0019 AU (280,000 km; 180,000 mi) from Earth at the time. (Note: The celestial coordinates of 2020 CD_{3} at the time of discovery were 13^{h} 03^{m} 33.11^{s} +09° 10′ 43.1″. See Virgo for constellation coordinates.) The observed orbital motion of the object suggested that it may be gravitationally bound to Earth, which prompted further observations to secure and determine its motion.

The object's discovery was reported to the Minor Planet Center's Near-Earth Object Confirmation Page (NEOCP), where a preliminary orbit was calculated from additional observations conducted at several observatories. Follow-up observations of 2020 CD_{3} spanned six days since its discovery, and the object was formally announced in a Minor Planet Electronic Circular notice issued by the Minor Planet Center on 25 February 2020. No indication of perturbations by solar radiation pressure was observed, and 2020 CD_{3} could not be linked to any known artificial object. Although the evidence implied that 2020 CD_{3} is most likely a dense, rocky asteroid, the possibility of the object being an artificial object, such as a dead satellite or rocket booster, had not yet been fully ruled out.

Precovery images of 2020 CD_{3} have been identified back to May 2018.

== Nomenclature ==
Upon discovery, the asteroid was given the temporary internal designation C26FED2. After follow up observations confirming the object, it was then given the provisional designation 2020 CD_{3} by the Minor Planet Center on 25 February 2020. The provisional designation signifies the object's discovery date and year. The object has not yet been issued a permanent minor planet number by the Minor Planet Center due to its modest observation arc of a couple years and that it has not been observed at enough oppositions.

== Orbit ==
Animation of 2020 CD_{3}'s orbit around Earth 2020 CD_{3} · Moon · Earth

Prior to the temporary capture of 2020 CD_{3}, its heliocentric orbit was probably Earth-crossing, either falling into the categories of an Aten-type orbit (a < 1 AU) or an Apollo-type orbit (a > 1 AU), with the former considered to be more likely.

=== Temporary capture ===
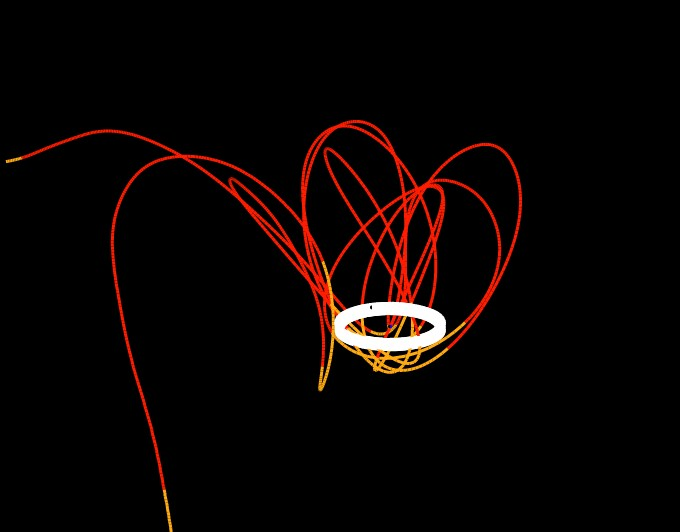
The orbit of 2020 CD_{3} around the Earth. The white band is the orbit of the Moon.

Trajectory and orbits of 2020 CD_{3} around Earth, from 2015 to 2020 (Note: JPL Horizons 28 Feb 2020 solution)

Because 2020 CD_{3} has an Earth-like heliocentric orbit, its motion relative to Earth is low, allowing for it to slowly approach the planet and be captured. Nominal orbit solutions for 2020 CD_{3} suggest that it was captured by Earth between 2016 and 2017, and left geocentric orbit by May 2020 according to simulations of its orbit. The geocentric orbit of 2020 CD_{3} is chaotic due to the combined effects of tidal forces from the Sun and Earth as well as repeated close encounters with the Moon. The Moon gravitationally perturbs 2020 CD_{3}'s geocentric orbit, causing it to be unstable. Over the course of 2020 CD_{3}'s orbit around Earth, repeated close encounters with the Moon leads to ejection from its geocentric orbit as the Moon's perturbations can transfer enough momentum for 2020 CD_{3} to escape Earth's gravitational influence.

2020 CD_{3}'s orbit around Earth is highly variable and eccentric, hence predictions of its past trajectory before mid-2017 are uncertain. Due to the Yarkovsky effect on small asteroids, the first precovery image being from 2018, and numerous approaches to the Earth and Moon, it is unknown if the asteroid was closer than the Moon on Christmas Day 2015.

Earth approach Christmas Day 2015?
Date	JPL Horizons nominal geocentric distance (AU)	NEODyS nominal geocentric distance (AU)	Find_Orb nominal geocentric distance (AU)	ESA NEOCC nominal geocentric distance (AU)	MPC nominal geocentric distance (AU)
2015-Dec-25	0.0006 AU (90 thousand km)	0.0162 AU (2.42 million km)	0.288 AU (43.1 million km)	0.345 AU (51.6 million km)	0.834 AU (124.8 million km)

Between September 2017 and February 2020 it made 12 close approaches to Earth, during which time it was never more than 0.0112 AU (1.68 million km) from Earth. According to the JPL Small-Body Database, on 15 September 2017 it passed 12,000 km (7,500 mi) from the Moon. The closest approach to Earth occurred on 4 April 2019, when it approached to a distance of 13,104 km (8,142 mi). (Note: 13104 km – Earth radius of 6371 km is 6733 km from the surface of Earth.) The final close approach in 2020 occurred on 13 February 2020 at a distance of about 41,000 km (25,000 mi) from Earth's surface. The orbital period of 2020 CD_{3} around Earth ranged from 70 to 90 days. 2020 CD_{3} escaped Earth's Hill sphere at roughly 0.01 AU (1.5 million km) in March 2020 and returned to solar orbit on 7 May 2020.

Escaping geocentric orbit 7 May 2020 (Note: Already outside of the Earth's Hill sphere which has a radius of roughly 0.01 AU (1.5 million km).) (assuming the Earth+asteroid are the only objects in the Solar System)
Epoch	Earth distance	Geocentric eccentricity	Apogee	Orbital period
2020-May-07	0.0189 AU (2.83 million km)	0.9901	2.25 AU (337 million km)	693.61 years (253,341 d)
2020-May-08	0.0191 AU (2.86 million km)	1.0347	$\infty$	$\infty$

Being captured into a temporary orbit around Earth, 2020 CD_{3} is a temporarily captured object or a temporary satellite of Earth. 2020 CD_{3} has also been widely referred to in the media as a "mini-moon" of Earth, due to its small size. 2020 CD_{3} is the second known temporary captured object discovered in situ around Earth, with the first being 2006 RH120 discovered in 2006. Other objects have also been suspected to have once been temporarily captured, including the small near-Earth asteroid 1991 VG and the bolide DN160822 03. Objects that get temporarily captured by Earth are thought to be common, though larger objects over 0.6 m (2 ft) in diameter are believed to be less likely to be captured by Earth and detected by modern telescopes.

=== Future approaches ===
2020 CD_{3} will continue orbiting the Sun and will approach Earth on 20 March 2044, from a distance of 0.0245 AU (3.67 million km; 2.28 million mi). It is unlikely that 2020 CD_{3} will be captured by Earth in the March 2044 encounter, as the approach distance is too large for capture and outside of Earth's Hill sphere. The next encounter will be August 2061, when it is expected to approach Earth from a nominal distance of 0.034 AU (5.1 million km; 3.2 million mi). After the 2061 encounter the uncertainties in future encounters become much greater. By 2082 close approaches have a 3-sigma uncertainty of ±7 days.

The possibility of 2020 CD_{3} impacting Earth has been considered by the Jet Propulsion Laboratory's Sentry risk table. JPL's solution accounts for non-gravitational forces as the multi-decade motion of a very small object is greatly affected by solar heating. Being only a few meters in size, an impact by 2020 CD_{3} would pose no threat to Earth as it would most likely fragment and disintegrate upon atmospheric entry. With a cumulative impact probability of 2.5%, it is listed as the most likely object to impact Earth, but because of the harmless size of 2020 CD_{3}, it is given a Torino Scale rating of 0 and a cumulative Palermo Scale rating of –5.20 Within the next 100 years, the date with the highest probability of impact is 9 September 2082, which is estimated to have an impact probability of 0.85% and a negligible Palermo Scale rating of –5.66. JPL Horizon's nominal orbit has the asteroid passing 0.00251 AU (375 thousand km) from Earth on 8 October 2082 (29 days after the virtual impactor).

== Physical characteristics ==
2020 CD_{3} is estimated to have an absolute magnitude (H) around 31.7, indicating that it is very small in size. Studies reported in November 2020 have determined that the asteroid is about 1–2 m (3.3–6.6 ft) in diameter. The rotation period and albedo of 2020 CD_{3} have not been measured due to the limited number of observations. Assuming that the albedo of 2020 CD_{3} is similar to those of dark, carbonaceous C-type asteroids, the diameter of 2020 CD_{3} is around 1.9–3.5 m (6–11 ft), comparable to in size to that of a small car. The JPL Sentry risk table estimates 2020 CD_{3} to have a mass of 4,900 kg (10,800 lb), based on the assumption that the asteroid has a diameter of 2 m (6.6 ft).

== See also ==
- 1991 VG – near-Earth asteroid temporarily captured by Earth after its discovery in 1991
- 2006 RH120 – the first temporary Earth satellite discovered in situ 2006
- 2022 NX1 another temporary Earth satellite discovered in 2022
- 2023 FY3 – another temporary Earth satellite discovered in 2023
- Claimed moons of Earth
- Quasi-satellite
