= 2021 GM1 =

Small near-Earth asteroid

2021 GM_{1} is a near-Earth asteroid which at absolute magnitude 30.4, which, depending on the actual albedo of the object, corresponds to a diameter of 2.2–4.9 metres (7.2–16.1 ft), is the smallest Solar System body observed over multiple years.

After it was discovered during its close approach to Earth in April 2021, a precovery position was found for its previous, May 2020 close approach, which constrains the orbit significantly. Its next close approach to Earth is in 2049.
