= DN160822 03 =

Former quasi-satellite of Earth

DN160822_03
Discovery
- Discovery site: Desert Fireball Network
- Discovery date: 22 August 2016

Physical characteristics
- Mean diameter: 2–3 m

DN160822_03 was a quasi-satellite of Earth that entered the atmosphere and exploded over eastern South Australia as a fireball (bolide) on 22 August 2016. The size of the object was thought to be two to three metres in diameter. The fireball was detected by the cameras of Desert Fireball Network of Australia, an automated network of cameras which watches for fireballs over the continent.

== History ==
The Russian website Russia Pulse reported in Russian as follows, translated into English:

Scientists of Curtin University in Australia have found out that on 22 August 2016, the atmosphere of the Earth above Australia included a natural Earth satellite. The small meteorite grasped by an attraction of a planet and for a while become its moon, [it has been learnt by] Science Alert. Researchers have defined, that speed of the object designated as DN160822_03, at falling was [remarkably] low and made 11 kilometers a second, and its trajectory was [somewhat] steep. Low speed specifies that the object rotated around of the Earth, and the angle of falling excludes space garbage, including idle space vehicles and their fragments. With 95 percent reliability the meteorite was a temporary Earth satellite.

DN160822_03 is one of several quasi-satellites or temporary natural satellites of Earth. Two of them were destroyed as noted in the 9 February 1913 Great Meteor Procession. These could be the last remnants of a ring around the Earth composed of ejecta of a lunar volcano. The near-Earth asteroid 3753 Cruithne is a co-orbital object in a Horseshoe orbit, as are a number of other quasi-satellites of Earth.

== See also ==
- WT1190F – space debris and temporary satellite of Earth that impacted in 2015
- 2020 CD3 – temporary satellite of Earth discovered in 2020
