= 1991 VG =

Near-Earth object

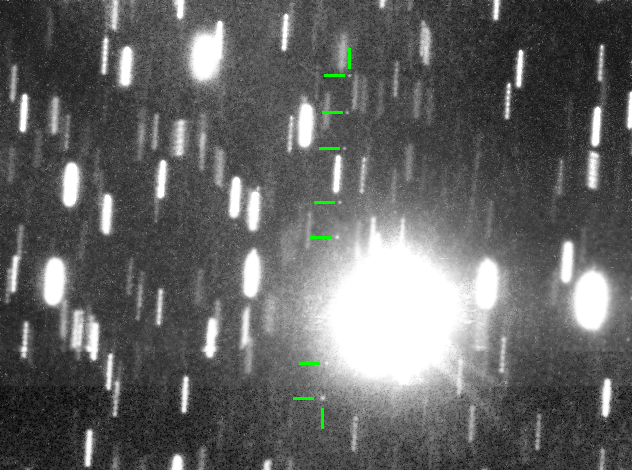
- Recovery of 1991 VG with the VLT, on 30 May 2017. The asteroid is marked with green lines, and appears several times on this time-lapse composite.

Discovery
- Discovered by: Spacewatch
- Discovery site: Kitt Peak Obs.
- Discovery date: 6 November 1991 (first observed only)

Designations
- Minor planet category: NEO · Apollo

Orbital characteristics
- Epoch 21 November 2025 (JD 2461000.5)
- Uncertainty parameter 0
- Observation arc: 25.57 yr (9 339 d)
- Aphelion: 1.0865 AU
- Perihelion: 0.9782 AU
- Semi-major axis: 1.0323 AU
- Eccentricity: 0.05244
- Orbital period (sidereal): 1.049 yr (383.12 d)
- Mean anomaly: 186.099°
- Mean motion: 0° 56^{m} 22.92^{s} / day
- Inclination: 1.4297°
- Longitude of ascending node: 71.270°
- Argument of perihelion: 26.928°
- Earth MOID: 0.002 AU (0.778 LD)
- Jupiter MOID: 3.925 AU

Physical characteristics
- Mean diameter: 5–12 m
- Absolute magnitude (H): 28.3

1991 VG is a very small near-Earth object of the Apollo group, approximately 5–12 meters (16–39 feet) in diameter. It was first observed by American astronomer James Scotti on 6 November 1991, using the Spacewatch telescope on Kitt Peak National Observatory near Tucson, Arizona, in the United States. On 6 December 1991 it passed about 369635 km from the Moon. The asteroid then went unobserved from April 1992 until it was recovered by Paranal Observatory in May 2017. It was removed from the Sentry Risk Table on 1 June 2017.

== Discovery and observations ==
On 6 November 1991, Scotti discovered a faint object which was designated 1991 VG soon after discovery.

=== Recovery ===
1991 VG was not observed between 1992 and 2017. After 26 years, 1991 VG had returned to the vicinity of Earth. As part of a program by ESA and ESO to secure the orbit of faint but potentially threatening Near-Earth Objects, 1991 VG was recovered by the ESO VLT on 30 May 2017, at magnitude 25. With this recovery, the orbit of 1991 VG is now determined with a high precision. It was removed from the Sentry Risk Table on 1 June 2017.

== Orbit ==
Soon after 1991 VG's discovery, its heliocentric orbit was found to be very similar to Earth's orbit and it was calculated that it would make a close approach to Earth in the month after discovery at 1.2 lunar distances or 0.003 AU (450,000 km; 280,000 mi) on 5 December 1991. 1991 VG also passed 0.0568 AU from Earth on 7 August 2017 and 0.0472 AU on 11 February 2018. Given such an Earth-like orbit, the dynamical lifetime of such an object is relatively short with the object quickly either impacting Earth or being perturbed by Earth onto a different orbit. The similarity of its orbit with Earth was also very difficult to explain from natural sources, with ejecta from a recent Lunar impact or non-gravitational perturbations such as the Yarkovsky effect having been suggested. The first Earth Trojan asteroid, 2010 TK_{7}, was later identified and such objects could well be a source for objects like 1991 VG.

1991 VG has been a transient co-orbital of the horseshoe type in the past (for example between AD 1382 and 1667) and it will return to such in the future. In 1991–1992 it looped around the Earth in a retrograde manner (east to west) with closest approach at 0.00306 AU on 5 December 1991. It had an eccentricity of less than 1 with respect to the Earth from 23 February to 21 March 1992, but was outside of Earth's Hill sphere. (Note: On 18 March 1992, 1991 VG was 0.0426 AU (6,370,000 km; 3,960,000 mi) from Earth moving at a relative speed of 0.26 km/s (580 mph) and had an eccentricity of 0.55 with respect to Earth. It was not orbiting Earth because it was outside of the Earth's Hill sphere which has a radius of roughly 0.01 AU (1.5 million km).) This temporary capture has taken place multiple times in the past and it is expected to repeat again in the future.

Currently, it is falling behind Earth as it orbits the Sun along with Earth. The two will again be on the same side of the Sun in November 2038.

Simulation has been performed for 5000 years into the future without detecting an impact on Earth. Around 400 BC there was an approach to a distance of around 0.001 AU, closer than the Moon (see Figure 1 in the paper by Carlos and Raúl de la Fuente Marcos).

== Possible monolithic structure ==
Since the discovery of 1991 VG, about 80% of small asteroids with absolute magnitudes fainter than 22.0 (corresponding to sizes smaller than about 200 meters) which have had their lightcurve measured have rotation periods under 2 hours. The so-called fast rotators are typically monolithic bodies or, alternatively, welded conglomerates with a sufficient intrinsic strength to counteract centrifugal forces. More slowly rotating asteroids are sometimes gravitationally bound aggregates or rubble piles.

== Possible artificial origin ==
The uncertainty of the object's origin, combined with rapid variation in the object's brightness in images obtained during its close passage with Earth in early December 1991, led to some speculation that 1991 VG might be a spent rocket fuel tank. There was speculation that it could be a rocket body from a satellite launched in the early 1970s, or from the Apollo 12 mission. A detailed analysis of the available evidence confirms that there is no compelling reason to believe that 1991 VG is not natural. The natural versus artificial issue also emerged in the case of the temporary capture episode experienced by near-Earth asteroid 2022 NX1.

== Exploration ==
The Near-Earth Asteroid Scout is a low-cost CubeSat solar sail spacecraft by NASA capable of encountering near-Earth asteroids and taking high resolution images and 1991 VG was the planned target before 2020 GE became the new target. The spacecraft was successfully launched into heliocentric orbit on 16 November 2022, however contact with the spacecraft was not successfully established and it is considered lost.

== See also ==
- 2024 PT5 – another temporary Earth satellite discovered in 2024
- 2023 FY3 – another temporary Earth satellite discovered in 2023
- 2022 NX1 – near-Earth asteroid temporarily captured by Earth in 2022
- 2020 CD3 – another temporary Earth satellite discovered in 2020
- 2006 RH120 – the first temporary Earth satellite discovered in situ 2006
