= 2020 SO =

Space junk

- The orbit of 2020 SO around Earth and Sun from Nov. 2020 to Mar. 2021

Discovery
- Discovered by: Pan-STARRS 1
- Discovery site: Haleakalā Obs.
- Discovery date: 17 September 2020

Designations
- Alternative designations: P116rK2
- Minor planet category: NEO · Apollo (May 2020); Atira (Dec 2020)

Orbital characteristics
- Epoch 17 December 2020 (JD 2459200.5)
- Uncertainty parameter 2
- Observation arc: 167 days
- Earliest precovery date: 19 August 2020
- Aphelion: 0.988 AU
- Perihelion: 0.985 AU
- Semi-major axis: 0.986 AU
- Eccentricity: 0.00181
- Orbital period (sidereal): 0.98 yr (357.9 d)
- Mean anomaly: 276.388°
- Mean motion: 1° 0^{m} 21.877^{s} / day
- Inclination: 0.1389°
- Longitude of ascending node: 216.656°
- Argument of perihelion: 311.989°
- Earth MOID: 0.01628 AU (May 2020); 0.00106 AU (Dec 2020)

Physical characteristics
- Mean diameter: 6–12 m (assumed)
- Synodic rotation period: 0.0026080±0.0000001 h or 9.39 s
- Apparent magnitude: 22.4 (at discovery); 14.1 (1 Dec 2020)
- Absolute magnitude (H): 27.66±0.34; 28.43

2020 SO is a near-Earth object identified to be the Centaur upper stage used on 20 September 1966 to launch the Surveyor 2 spacecraft. The object was discovered by the Pan-STARRS 1 survey at the Haleakala Observatory on 17 September 2020. It was initially suspected to be an artificial object due to its low velocity relative to Earth and later on the noticeable effects of solar radiation pressure on its orbit. Spectroscopic observations by NASA's Infrared Telescope Facility in December 2020 found that the object's spectrum is similar to that of stainless steel, confirming the object's artificial nature. Following the object's confirmation as space debris, the object was removed from the Minor Planet Center's database on 19 February 2021.

== Overview ==
As it approached Earth, the trajectory indicated the geocentric orbital eccentricity was less than 1 by 15 October 2020, (Note: The JPL Horizons On-Line Ephemeris System shows the geocentric orbital eccentricity dropping below 1 by 15 October 2020. But a second condition for capture is that the object is within Earth's Hill sphere which has a radius of roughly 0.01 AU (1.5 million km). Meeting both conditions is when the object is in a temporary satellite capture around Earth.) and the object became temporarily captured on 8 November when it entered Earth's Hill sphere. It entered via the outer Lagrange point L_{2} and will exit via Lagrange point L_{1}. During its geocentric orbit around Earth, 2020 SO made a close approach to Earth on 1 December 2020 at a perigee distance of approximately 0.13 lunar distances (50,000 km; 31,000 mi). It also made another close approach on 2 February 2021, at a perigee distance of approximately 0.58 LD (220,000 km; 140,000 mi). Since discovery the time of uncertainty for February 2021 closest approach to Earth was reduced from ±3 days to less than 1 minute. It left Earth's Hill sphere at around 8 March 2021.

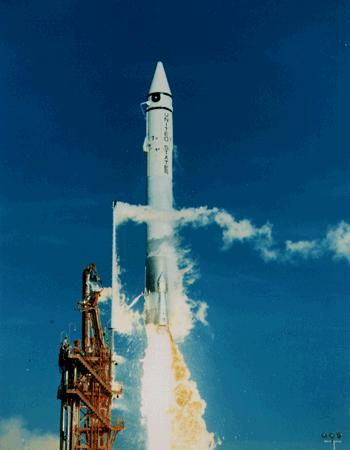
Photograph of the Surveyor 2 Atlas-Centaur rocket booster at launch in 1966

Paul Chodas of the Jet Propulsion Laboratory suspects 2020 SO of being the Surveyor 2 Centaur rocket booster, launched on 20 September 1966. The Earth-like orbit and low relative velocity suggest a possible artificial object. Spectroscopy may help determine if it is covered in white titanium dioxide paint. Goldstone radar produced bistatic observations on 30 November 2020 transmitting from the 70-meter DSS-14 and receiving at the 34-meter DSS-13. As a result of the bistatic DSS-14/RT-32 radar observations, a rotation period of about 9.5 seconds was obtained, which corresponds to the photometric observations. Obtained range-Doppler radar images confirm that the object has an elongated shape with a length of about 10 meters and a width of about 3 meters.

Around the time of closest approach on 1 December 2020, the object was only brightened to about apparent magnitude 14.1, and required a telescope with roughly a 150mm (6") objective lens to be seen visually. It displays a large light curve amplitude of 2.5 magnitudes, signifying a highly elongated shape or albedo variations on its surface. It has a rotation period of approximately 9 seconds.

At the time of its discovery, 2020 SO had unremarkable motion typical of a main-belt asteroid. However, the four observations that Pan-STARRS obtained over the course of 1.4 hours showed non-linear motion due to the rotation of the observer around Earth's axis, which is a signature of a nearby object.

Orbital Elements for May and December 2020
Parameter	Epoch	Orbit type	Period (p)	Aphelion (Q)	Perihelion (q)	Semi-major axis (a)	Inclination (i)	Heliocentric eccentricity (e)	Geocentric eccentricity (e) (Note: Orbital eccentricity must be below 1 to be orbiting the central body.)
Units			(years)	AU			(°)		
	2020-May-31	Apollo	1.056	1.0722	1.0020	1.0371	0.14061°	0.03389	737
	2020-Dec-17	Atira	0.980	0.9882	0.9847	0.9865	0.13842°	0.00180	0.89934

Animation of 2020 SO's orbit

Around the Sun

Around the Earth

Sun · Earth · 2020 SO · Moon

In January and February 2036, it will again approach Earth with a geocentric eccentricity less than 1 since the relative velocities will be small, but will not be within Earth's Hill sphere of 0.01 AU (1.5 million km). (Note: An object needs to be within Earth's Hill sphere to truly be in orbit. An object 1AU from Earth could have a geocentric e<1 if the relative velocities are small, but we would not say it is orbiting Earth.)

== See also ==
- J002E3 – a near-Earth object discovered in 2002 that was identified as the S-IVB third stage of the Apollo 12 Saturn V rocket
- WT1190F – temporarily orbiting space debris that entered Earth's atmosphere in 2015
- 2018 AV2 – an artificial object discovered in a temporary orbit around Earth in 2018, now suspected to be the Snoopy module from Apollo 10
- 6Q0B44E – another artificial object discovered in orbit around Earth in 2018
- Space debris
- Temporary satellite
