= 6Q0B44E =

Object in high Earth orbit

- Animation of 6Q0B44E's calculated orbit around Earth and the Moon from 2004-09; 6Q0B44E · Earth · Moon

Discovery
- Discovered by: Catalina Sky Survey (703); Siding Spring Survey (E12); Mount Lemmon Survey (G96)
- Discovery date: 28 August 2006

Designations
- Alternative names: XL8D89E?

Orbital characteristics
- Epoch 2007 Jan 1.0 (JD 2454101.5)
- Periapsis: 557,765 km (346,579 mi) (1.451 LD, 87.45 ER)
- Apoapsis: 862,590 km (535,990 mi) (2.244 LD, 135.24 ER)
- Semi-major axis: 710,177 km (441,284 mi) (1.847 LD, 111.35 ER)
- Eccentricity: 0.214612
- Orbital period (sidereal): 68.93 days
- Mean anomaly: 308.134°
- Inclination: 43.273°
- Longitude of ascending node: 130.039°
- Time of perihelion: 2007/01/10 22:21:48
- Argument of perihelion: 140.596°
- Satellite of: Earth

Physical characteristics
- Absolute magnitude (H): 30.2

6Q0B44E, sometimes abbreviated to B44E, is a small object that was discovered orbiting Earth outside the orbit of the Moon in August 2006. It was observed until March 2007, at which point it was lost. It is likely, though unproven, that the same object was re-discovered as XL8D89E, which was observed between 2015 and 2018.

The properties of 6Q0B44E indicate it is probably an artificial item of space debris, just a few metres across. Orbit calculations show it experiences non-gravitational accelerations (such as a slow gas leak) that gradually shift its position, making it difficult to track.

== Discovery ==
6Q0B44E was first observed by Catalina Sky Survey researchers at the Lunar and Planetary Laboratory of the University of Arizona on 28 August 2006. The sighting was confirmed the next day by observations at the Siding Spring Survey and Table Mountain Observatory.

== Observations ==
6Q0B44E was spotted at what was later calculated to be the brightest part of its orbit, at 19th magnitude. As the object moved away from Earth, its brightness dropped on an approximately six-month cycle down to 28th magnitude, severely limiting study.

The object was observed 56 times in the seven months after its discovery, but was lost in March 2007. Another unidentified satellite of Earth, XL8D89E, was discovered in June 2016 on a similar – but not identical – orbit. It is likely, though unproven, that both 6Q0B44E and XL8D89E are the same object, with the orbit shifted in the intervening decade by non-gravitational accelerations (such as slow escape of gas). XL8D89E was observed regularly until May 2017, then again in November 2018, before being lost.

== Properties ==
The object is just a few metres across and was classified as probably artificial. 6Q0B44E (and XL8D89E) orbits Earth between 585,000 and 983,000 km, which is 2 to 3 times the distance of the Moon's orbit, over a period of 80 days. Its density was estimated at around 15 kg/m^{3}, too low for natural rock but similar to an empty fuel tank.

Ephemerides calculated from the observations suggest that 6Q0B44E probably entered the Earth–Moon system between 2001 and 2003, although it may have arrived up to a decade earlier. Similarities between the discoveries of 6Q0B44E and J002E3, thought to be part of the Apollo 12 rocket, led some astronomers to speculate that 6Q0B44E may be another relic of human space exploration which has returned to Earth orbit. However, no space mission has been identified as the source of 6Q0B44E.

== See also ==
- 2006 RH120 – An object making close approaches to the Earth–Moon system around every twenty years
- 3753 Cruithne – An asteroid in an Earth horseshoe orbit
- 2002 AA29 – Another asteroid in an Earth horseshoe orbit
- Natural satellite
