= Surveyor 2 =

Failed lunar lander launched in 1966

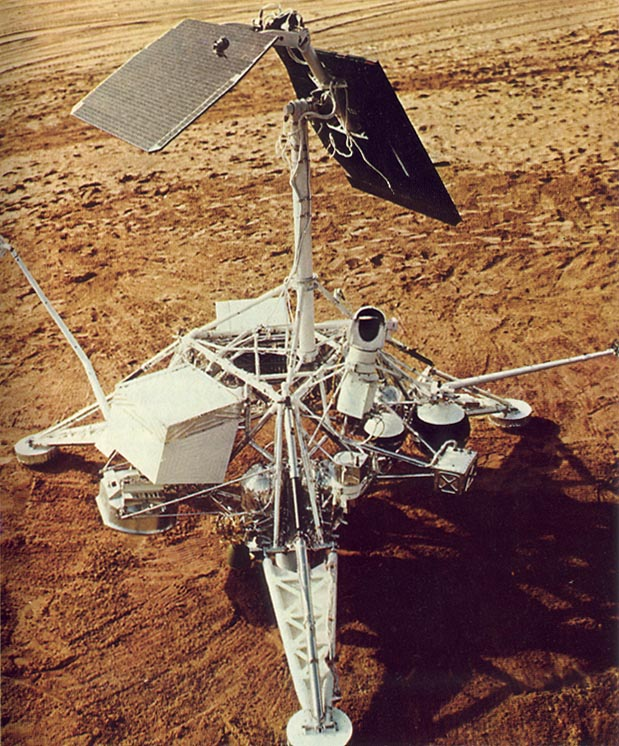
- Surveyor model on Earth
- Mission type: Lunar lander
- Operator: NASA
- COSPAR ID: 1966-084A
- SATCAT no.: 02425
- Mission duration: 45 hours 3 min. to last contact; 62 hours 46 min. to failed soft landing

Spacecraft properties
- Manufacturer: Hughes Aircraft
- Launch mass: 995.2 kilograms (2,194 lb)
- Dry mass: 292 kilograms (644 lb)

Start of mission
- Launch date: September 20, 1966, 12:32:00 UTC
- Rocket: Atlas LV-3C Centaur-D AC-7
- Launch site: Cape Canaveral LC-36A

Lunar impact (failed landing)
- Impact date: September 23, 1966, 03:18:00 UTC
- Impact site: 04.0°S 11.0°W

Surveyor 2 was to be the second lunar lander in the uncrewed American Surveyor program to explore the Moon. After launch on September 20, 1966, a mid-course correction failure resulted in the spacecraft losing control. Contact was lost with the spacecraft at 9:35 UTC, September 22.

== Background ==
On February 3, 1966, the Luna 9 spacecraft was the first spacecraft to achieve a lunar soft landing and to transmit photographic data to Earth. On May 30, Surveyor 1 launched, landing on Oceanus Procellarum on June 2. This craft also transmitted photographic data back to Earth.

This spacecraft was the second of a series designed to achieve a soft landing on the Moon and to return lunar surface photography for determining characteristics of the lunar terrain for Apollo program lunar landing missions. Besides transmitting photos, Surveyor 2 was planned to perform a 'bounce', to photograph underneath its own landing site. It was also equipped to return data on radar reflectivity of the lunar surface, bearing strength of the lunar surface, and spacecraft temperatures for use in the analysis of lunar surface temperatures.

== Launch ==
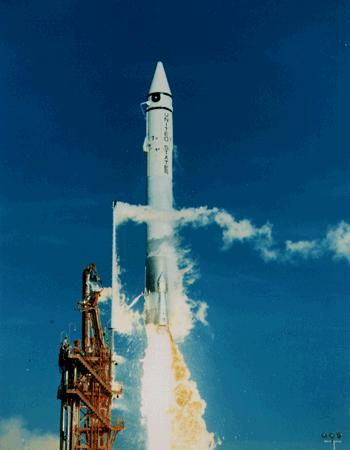
Launch of Surveyor 2 on an Atlas-Centaur (AC-7)

The launch took place from Space Launch Complex 36A at Cape Kennedy, Florida aboard an Atlas-Centaur rocket. Liftoff was at 12:32 UTC on 20 September 1966.

== Failure ==
The target area proposed was within Sinus Medii. The Atlas-Centaur had placed Surveyor 2 on a path to the Moon that was only 130 km from its aim point. During the midcourse correction maneuver one vernier thruster failed to ignite, resulting in unbalanced thrust that caused the spacecraft to tumble for its remaining 54 hours. Attempts to salvage the mission failed. Contact was lost with the spacecraft at 9:35 UTC, September 22. The spacecraft was targeted at Sinus Medii, but crashed near Copernicus crater. The spacecraft was calculated to have impacted the lunar surface at 03:18 UTC, September 23, 1966. Its weight on impact was 644 lb (292 kg), and speed was about 6000 miles an hour (2.6 km/s = 5840 mph), slightly over lunar escape velocity (2.4 km/s) and similar to the impact velocities of the Ranger program spacecraft.

== Aftermath ==
Lunar exploration continued to be challenging. The next Soviet mission, Cosmos 111, was launched on March 1, 1966, but failed to reach a proper lunar trajectory, re-entering Earth's atmosphere two days later. Surveyor 3 soft-landed on April 20, 1967, at the Mare Cognitum portion of the Oceanus Procellarum. It transmitted a total of 6,315 television images to the Earth.

There were seven Surveyor missions; five were successful. Surveyors 2 and 4 failed. Each consisted of a single uncrewed spacecraft designed and built by Hughes Aircraft Company. The precise location of the Surveyor 2 crash site is unknown.

== Centaur upper stage ==
Animation of 2020 SO around Earth

The Centaur upper stage of the rocket used to launch Surveyor continued on its original trajectory past the Moon, placing it into a solar orbit similar to that of the Earth. The Centaur was untracked from that point forward. In August 2020, NASA announced the sighting of an object in a solar orbit which could shortly make a close pass with the Earth. On September 23, 2020, NASA announced that this was likely the lost Centaur booster, and likely to be re-captured into Earth orbit. This would be the second time that a rocket upper stage has done so, after the upper stage of a Saturn V rocket from the Apollo 12 launch re-entered Earth orbit in 2002. In December 2020, NASA confirmed that it was the lost Centaur stage.

== See also ==
- List of artificial objects on the Moon
- List of missions to the Moon
