= List of missions to minor planets =

List of missions to minor planets is a listing of spaceflight missions to minor planets, which are category of astronomical body that excludes planets, moons and comets, but orbit the Sun. Most missions to minor planets have been to asteroids or dwarf planets.

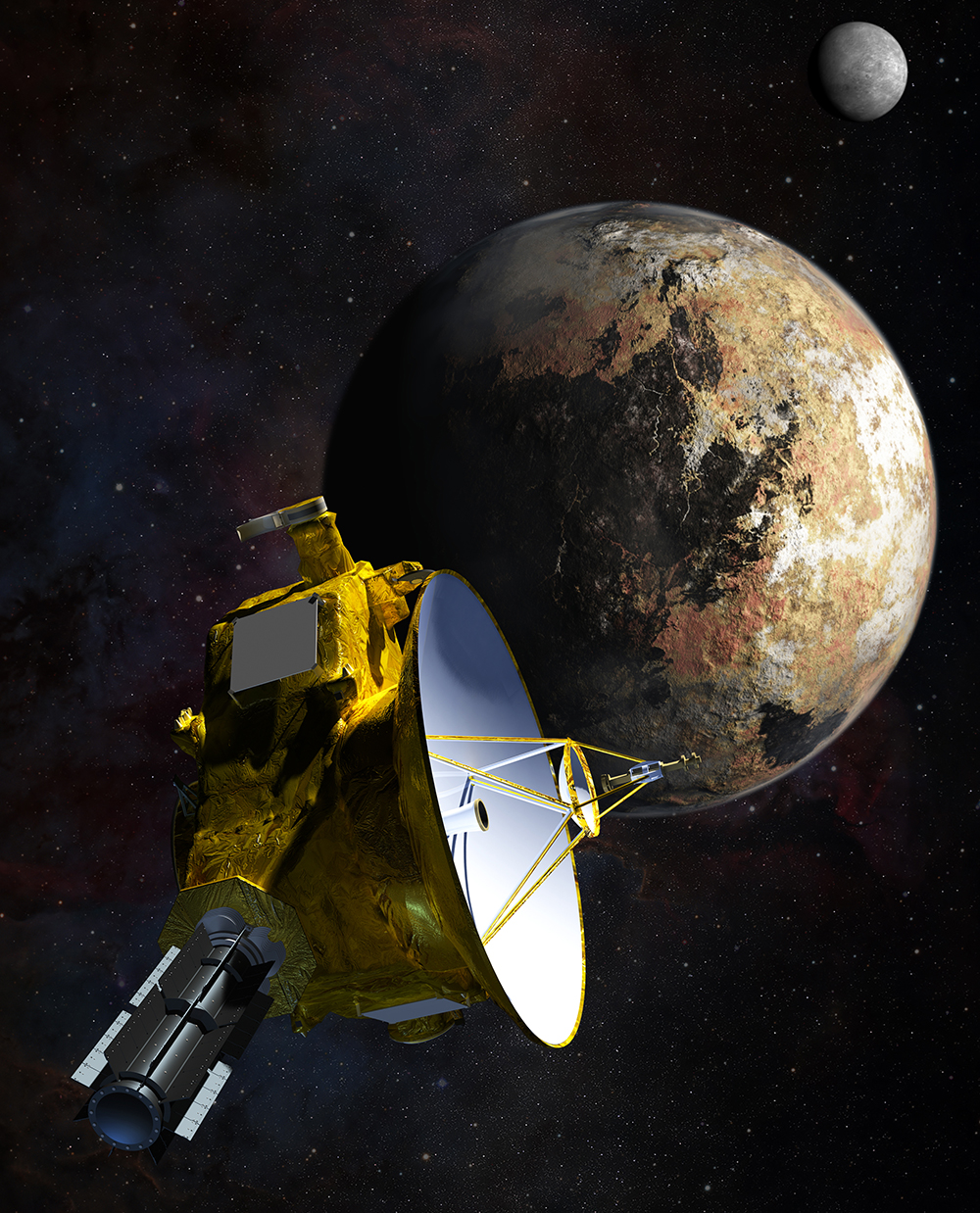
An artist's impression of New Horizons' close encounter with the Plutonian system

Spacecraft visits to minor planets have mostly been flybys, and have ranged from dedicated missions to incidental flybys and targets of opportunity for spacecraft that have already completed their missions. The first spacecraft to visit an asteroid was Pioneer 10, which flew past an unnamed asteroid on 2 August 1972; a distant incidental encounter while the probe was en route to Jupiter. The first dedicated mission was NEAR Shoemaker, which was launched in February 1996, and entered orbit around 433 Eros in February 2000, having first flown past 253 Mathilde. NEAR was also the first spacecraft to land on an asteroid, surviving what was intended to be an impact with Eros at 20:01 on 12 February 2001 at the planned end of its mission. As a result of its unexpected survival, the spacecraft's mission was extended until 1 March to allow data to be collected from the surface.

== Missions ==
There have been thirty-three overall missions towards minor planets, with four of them being flyby missions that were not intended to explore minor planets, marked in grey background.

Many minor planets are in two domains:

- Asteroid belt, between 2–3 AU (0.30–0.45 billion km)
- Kuiper belt, between 30–60 AU (4.5–9.0 billion km)

Mission		Spacecraft	Launch date	Carrier rocket	Operator	Destination	Mission type	Outcome
–	Pioneer 10	Pioneer 10	2 March 1972	Atlas SLV-3C Centaur-D Star-37E	(United States) NASA	Unnamed asteroid	Flyby	—N/a
–	Pioneer 10	Pioneer 10	2 March 1972	Atlas SLV-3C Centaur-D Star-37E	(United States) NASA	307 Nike	Flyby	—N/a
–	Pioneer 10	Distant incidental flybys en route to Jupiter; closest approaches occurred on 2 August 1972 and 2 December 1972, respectively, with a distance of 8.8 million km (5.5 million mi).						
–	Galileo project	Galileo	18 October 1989	Space Shuttle Atlantis; STS-34 / IUS	(United States) NASA	951 Gaspra	Flyby	Successful
–	Galileo project	Galileo	18 October 1989	Space Shuttle Atlantis; STS-34 / IUS	(United States) NASA	243 Ida	Flyby	Successful
–	Galileo project	Incidental flybys en route to Jupiter; flyby of 951 Gaspra occurred on 29 October 1991 with closest approach of 1,604 kilometres (997 mi) at 22:37 UTC; flyby of 243 Ida occurred on 28 August 1993 with closest approach of 2,410 kilometres (1,500 mi) at 16:51:59 UTC; discovered Dactyl						
1	DSPSE	Clementine	25 January 1994	Titan II(23)G	(United States) NASA	1620 Geographos	Flyby	Spacecraft failure
1	DSPSE	Attitude control failure; failed to leave geocentric orbit after first phase of mission exploring the Moon. Flyby had been planned for August 1994						
2	Discovery 1	NEAR Shoemaker	17 February 1996	Delta II 7925	(United States) NASA	253 Mathilde	Flyby	Successful
2	Discovery 1	NEAR Shoemaker	17 February 1996	Delta II 7925	(United States) NASA	433 Eros	Orbiter	Mostly successful
2	Discovery 1	Closest approach to Mathilde was 1,212 kilometres (753 mi) at 12:56 UTC on 27 June 1997. Three days before arrival at Eros the orbiter aborted a burn resulting in failure to enter orbit, instead flew past at 3,827 kilometres (2,378 mi) at 18:41:23 on 23 December 1998. Insertion reattempted successfully on 14 February 2000. Impacted asteroid at 20:01 on 12 February 2001 at end of mission, but survived impact and continued to operate on surface until 1 March.						
–	Cassini-Huygens	Cassini	15 October 1997	Titan IV(401)B Centaur-T	(United States) NASA	2685 Masursky	Flyby	—N/a
–	Cassini-Huygens	Distant incidental flyby en route to Saturn; closest approach 1.5 million kilometres (0.9 million miles) at 09:58 UTC on 23 January 2000						
3	New Millennium 1	Deep Space 1	24 October 1998	Delta II 7326	(United States) NASA	4015 Wilson–Harrington	Flyby	Spacecraft failure
3	New Millennium 1	Deep Space 1	24 October 1998	Delta II 7326	(United States) NASA	9969 Braille	Flyby	Partial failure
3	New Millennium 1	Spacecraft was unable to reach Wilson–Harrington due to ion engine operation being suspended while a problem with the probe's star tracker was investigated. Braille flyby added to mission following loss of ability to reach Wilson–Harrington. Closest approach 28.3 kilometres (17.6 mi) at 04:46 UTC on 29 July 1999. Intended to pass within 14 kilometres (8.7 mi) but this was not achieved due to a computer failure; poor-quality images returned as a result.						
4	Discovery 4	Stardust	7 February 1999	Delta II 7426	(United States) NASA	5535 Annefrank	Flyby	Successful
4	Discovery 4	Closest approach of 3,079 kilometres (1,913 mi) at 04:50:20 UTC on 2 November 2002.						
5	Hayabusa (formerly: MUSES-C)	Hayabusa	9 May 2003	M-V	(Japan) JAXA	25143 Itokawa	Orbiter/Lander/Sample returner	Successful
5	Hayabusa (formerly: MUSES-C)	MINERVA	9 May 2003	M-V	(Japan) JAXA	25143 Itokawa	Lander	Failure
5	Hayabusa (formerly: MUSES-C)	First asteroid sample return mission. Reached Itokawa on 12 September 2005, landed briefly on 19 and 25 November, collected samples, missed return window due to communications outage, finally returned to Earth on 13 June 2010. MINERVA deployable lander was deployed from Hayabusa on 12 November 2005 but was accidentally released while Hayabusa was moving away from Itokawa; reached escape velocity and drifted off into heliocentric orbit						
6	Cornerstone 3	Rosetta	2 March 2004	Ariane 5G+	ESA	2867 Šteins	Flyby	Successful
6	Cornerstone 3	Rosetta	2 March 2004	Ariane 5G+	ESA	21 Lutetia	Flyby	Successful
6	Cornerstone 3	Closest approach of Šteins at 800 kilometres (500 mi) on 5 September 2008. Closest approach of Lutetia at 3,162 kilometres (1,965 mi) on 10 July 2010. The spacecraft also carried the Philae lander, which was to land on 67P/Churyumov–Gerasimenko in 2014.						
7	Discovery 7	Deep Impact	12 January 2005	Delta II 7426	(United States) NASA	(163249) 2002 GT	Flyby	Spacecraft failure (Extended mission)
7	Discovery 7	Extended mission (EPOXI), flyby was expected in 2020, but communication with the spacecraft was lost in August 2013.						
8	New Frontiers 1	New Horizons	19 January 2006	Atlas V 551	(United States) NASA	132524 APL	Incidental flyby	—N/a
8	New Frontiers 1	New Horizons	19 January 2006	Atlas V 551	(United States) NASA	134340 Pluto and its five moons.	Flyby	Successful
8	New Frontiers 1	New Horizons	19 January 2006	Atlas V 551	(United States) NASA	486958 Arrokoth	Flyby	Successful
8	New Frontiers 1	Closest approach of APL at 101,867 kilometres (63,297 mi) at 04:05 UTC on 13 June 2006. First probe to flyby Pluto, on 14 July 2015. Flyby of Arrokoth occurred on 1 January 2019.						
9	Discovery 9	Dawn	27 September 2007	Delta II 7925H	(United States) NASA	4 Vesta	Orbiter	Successful
9	Discovery 9	Dawn	27 September 2007	Delta II 7925H	(United States) NASA	1 Ceres	Orbiter	Successful
9	Discovery 9	Orbited Vesta from 16 July 2011 to 5 September 2012, before departing for Ceres. Arrived at Ceres in 2015.						
10	Chang'e 2	Chang'e 2	1 October 2010	Long March 3C	(China) CNSA	4179 Toutatis	Flyby	Successful
10	Chang'e 2	Flyby on 13 December 2012, closest approach 3.2 kilometres (2.0 mi).						
11	Hayabusa2	Hayabusa2	3 December 2014	H-IIA 202	(Japan) JAXA	162173 Ryugu	Orbiter/Lander/Sample Returner	Successful
11	Hayabusa2	DCAM-3	3 December 2014	H-IIA 202	(Japan) JAXA	162173 Ryugu	Orbiter	Successful
11	Hayabusa2	SCI impactor	3 December 2014	H-IIA 202	(Japan) JAXA	162173 Ryugu	Impactor	Successful
11	Hayabusa2	HIBOU	3 December 2014	H-IIA 202	(Japan) JAXA	162173 Ryugu	Lander	Successful
11	Hayabusa2	OWL	3 December 2014	H-IIA 202	(Japan) JAXA	162173 Ryugu	Lander	Successful
11	Hayabusa2	MINERVA II-2	3 December 2014	H-IIA 202	(Japan) JAXA	162173 Ryugu	Lander	Spacecraft failure
11	Hayabusa2	MASCOT	3 December 2014	H-IIA 202	(Japan) JAXA	162173 Ryugu	Lander	Successful
11	Hayabusa2	Hayabusa2♯ (Note: For the extended mission, the Hayabusa2 mission was renamed Hayabusa2♯.)	3 December 2014	H-IIA 202	(Japan) JAXA	98943 Torifune	Flyby	Successful
11	Hayabusa2	Hayabusa2♯	3 December 2014	H-IIA 202	(Japan) JAXA	1998 KY26	Orbiter/Lander	en route
11	Hayabusa2	PROCYON	3 December 2014	H-IIA 202	(Japan) JAXA	(185851) 2000 DP107	Flyby	Spacecraft failure
11	Hayabusa2	Hayabusa-2 arrived in 2018, landed in February and July 2019; sample returned to Earth on 5 December 2020 UTC. HIBOU and OWL were both deployed on 21 September 2018. MINERVA-II was deployed on 2 October 2019; it had failed prior to deployment but was deployed anyway to observe the effects of gravity on it as it descended to the surface. MASCOT was deployed on 3 October 2018; operated for 17 hours. DCAM-3 and SCI Impactor were deployed on 5 April 2019; DCAM-3 observed SCI impact. PROCYON flyby of 2000 DP107 had been planned for 2016; cancelled due to ion engine failure in heliocentric orbit.						
12	New Frontiers 3	OSIRIS-REx / OSIRIS-APEX (Note: The same spacecraft used for Bennu mission will be used in studying Apophis. While the spacecraft remained same, only the mission was renamed as OSIRIS-APEX.)	8 September 2016	Atlas V 411	(United States) NASA	101955 Bennu	Orbiter/Sample Returner	Successful
12	New Frontiers 3	OSIRIS-REx / OSIRIS-APEX	8 September 2016	Atlas V 411	(United States) NASA	99942 Apophis	Orbiter/Lander	en route
12	New Frontiers 3	Successfully collected sample of Bennu on 20 October 2020 and returned the sample to Earth on 24 September 2023. For its extended mission called OSIRIS-APEX, the spacecraft is now en route to encounter Apophis on 8 April 2029.						
13	Discovery 13	Lucy	16 October 2021	Atlas V 401	(United States) NASA	152830 Dinkinesh	Flyby	Successful
13	Discovery 13	Lucy	16 October 2021	Atlas V 401	(United States) NASA	52246 Donaldjohanson	Flyby	Successful
13	Discovery 13	Lucy	16 October 2021	Atlas V 401	(United States) NASA	3548 Eurybates	Flyby	en route
13	Discovery 13	Lucy	16 October 2021	Atlas V 401	(United States) NASA	15094 Polymele	Flyby	planned
13	Discovery 13	Lucy	16 October 2021	Atlas V 401	(United States) NASA	11351 Leucus	Flyby	planned
13	Discovery 13	Lucy	16 October 2021	Atlas V 401	(United States) NASA	21900 Orus	Flyby	planned
13	Discovery 13	Lucy	16 October 2021	Atlas V 401	(United States) NASA	617 Patroclus	Flyby	planned
13	Discovery 13	Closest approach of Dinkinesh at 425 km (264 mi) at 16:54 UTC on 1 November 2023. Flyby of Donaldjohanson on 20 April 2025, Eurybates on 12 August 2027, Polymele on 15 September 2027, Leucus on 18 April 2028, Orus on 11 November 2028 and Patroclus on 2 March 2033.						
14	SSE 1	DART	24 November 2021	Falcon 9	(United States) NASA	Dimorphos	Impactor	Successful
14	SSE 1	LICIACube	24 November 2021	Falcon 9	(Italy) ASI	65803 Didymos system	Flyby	Successful
14	SSE 1	The U.S. component of AIDA. DART impacted 23:14 UTC 26 September 2022. LICIACube separated from DART on 11 September 2022 and on flew by about 3 minutes after DART's impact.						
15	NEA Scout	NEA Scout	16 November 2022	SLS Block 1	(United States) NASA	2020 GE	Flyby	Spacecraft failure
15	NEA Scout	Spacecraft was to perform a series of lunar flybys before targeting asteroid in September 2023, but after launch contact was lost and later the mission was declared as a failure.						
16	Discovery 14	Psyche	13 October 2023	Falcon Heavy	(United States) NASA	16 Psyche	Orbiter	en route
16	Discovery 14	Arrives in August 2029.						
17	Hera	Hera	7 October 2024	Falcon 9	ESA	65803 Didymos system	Orbiter	en route
17	Hera	Milani	7 October 2024	Falcon 9	ESA	65803 Didymos system	Orbiter	en route
17	Hera	Juventas	7 October 2024	Falcon 9	ESA	65803 Didymos system	Orbiter	en route
17	Hera	The European component of AIDA. Arrives in December 2026 according to current plans.						
18	Brokkr-2	Odin	February 26, 2025	Falcon 9 Block 5	(United States) AstroForge	2022 OB5	Flyby	Spacecraft failure
18	Brokkr-2	was expected to reach 2022 OB5, a suspected M-type near-Earth object, in December 2025, but failed after launch.						
19	Tianwen-2	Tianwen-2	May 29, 2025	Long March 3B	(China) CNSA	469219 Kamoʻoalewa	Sample return	Operational
19	Tianwen-2	Exploring the co-orbital near-Earth asteroid 469219 Kamoʻoalewa and collecting samples of its regolith.						

== Statistics ==
=== Major milestones ===
Legend

Milestone achieved
Milestone not achieved
† First to achieve

Asteroid belt
Country/Agency	Flyby	Orbit	Impact	Touchdown	Lander	Hopper	Rover	Sample return
United States	Galileo, (Gaspra) 1991 †	NEAR Shoemaker, (Eros) 2000 †	NEAR Shoemaker, (Eros) 2001 †	OSIRIS-REx, 2020	—	—	—	OSIRIS-REx, 2023
Japan	—	—	SCI, (Ryugu) 2014	Hayabusa, (Itokawa) 2005 †	—	HIBOU and OWL, (Ryugu) 2018 †	—	Hayabusa, (Itokawa) 2010 †
ESA	Rosetta, (Šteins) 2008	Rosetta, (Churyumov–Gerasimenko) 2014	—	—	Philae, (Churyumov–Gerasimenko) 2014 †	—	—	—
China	Chang'e 2, (Toutatis) 2012	—	—	—	—	—	—	—
Italy	LICIACube, (Didymos system) 2022	—	—	—	—	—	—	—

Kuiper belt
Country/Agency	Flyby	Orbit
United States	New Horizons, (Pluto) 2015 †	—

== Future missions ==
Mission	Spacecraft	Launch date	Carrier rocket	Operator	Destination	Mission type
DESTINY+	DESTINY+	2028	H3	(Japan) JAXA	3200 Phaethon	Flyby
DESTINY+	Planned arrival in 2030.					
Ramses	Ramses	2028	H3	ESA (Japan) JAXA	99942 Apophis	Flyby
Ramses	Don Quijote	2028	H3	ESA (Japan) JAXA	99942 Apophis	Flyby
Ramses	Farinella	2028	H3	ESA (Japan) JAXA	99942 Apophis	Flyby
Ramses	ESA Space Safety Programme mission.					
MBR Explorer	MBR Explorer	March 2028	H3	(United Arab Emirates) UAESA	10253 Westerwald	Flyby
MBR Explorer	MBR Explorer	March 2028	H3	(United Arab Emirates) UAESA	623 Chimaera	Flyby
MBR Explorer	MBR Explorer	March 2028	H3	(United Arab Emirates) UAESA	13294 Rockox	Flyby
MBR Explorer	MBR Explorer	March 2028	H3	(United Arab Emirates) UAESA	88055 Ghaf	Flyby
MBR Explorer	MBR Explorer	March 2028	H3	(United Arab Emirates) UAESA	23871 Ousha	Flyby
MBR Explorer	MBR Explorer	March 2028	H3	(United Arab Emirates) UAESA	59980 Moza	Flyby
MBR Explorer	MBR Lander	March 2028	H3	(United Arab Emirates) UAESA	269 Justitia	Orbiter/lander
MBR Explorer	Planned flybys of six asteroids between 2030 and 2033, then orbiting Justitia in October 2034 and landing there in May 2035.					

== See also ==
- List of minor planets and comets visited by spacecraft
- Timeline of Solar System exploration
  - List of missions to Venus
  - List of missions to the Moon
  - List of missions to Mars
  - List of missions to the outer planets
  - List of missions to comets
