= Don Quijote (spacecraft) =

Space probe concept

- Mission type: Orbiter, impactor, and lander
- Operator: European Space Agency
- Website: Don Quijote concept

Spacecraft properties
- Bus: Modified SMART-1
- Launch mass: Orbiter: 491 kg (1,082 lb); Lander: 1,694 kg (3,735 lb)
- Dry mass: Orbiter: 395 kg (871 lb); Lander: 532 kg (1,173 lb)
- Payload mass: Orbiter: 20.6 kg (45 lb); Lander: 9 kg (20 lb)

Start of mission
- Launch date: Studied for a 2015 launch

Orbital parameters
- Reference system: Heliocentric

2003 SM84 or 99942 Apophis orbiter
- Spacecraft component: Sancho
- Orbits: Months

2003 SM84 or 99942 Apophis impactor
- Spacecraft component: Hidalgo

2003 SM84 or 99942 Apophis lander
- Spacecraft component: Autonomous Surface Package

Don Quijote was a space mission concept that has been studied from 2005 until 2007 by the European Space Agency, and which would investigate the effects of crashing a spacecraft into an asteroid to test whether a spacecraft could successfully deflect an asteroid on a collision course with Earth. The orbiter was designed to last for seven years. The mission did not proceed beyond initial studies.

Nonetheless, this concept inspired the ESA which is currently working with its American counterpart, NASA, on the space cooperation called AIDA (for Asteroid Impact and Deflection Assessment). AIDA includes two consecutive but independent missions: DART and Hera.

== Overview ==
The mission would have consisted of two spacecraft that would execute a series of maneuvers around a small, 500-metre (1,600-foot) asteroid.

- The first spacecraft, Sancho, was intended to arrive at the asteroid and orbit it for several months, studying it. The orbiter would have used a single xenon ion engine.
- After a few months, the second spacecraft, Hidalgo, would have hurtled toward the asteroid on a collision course. Having "slept" for most of the trip, it would have then steered itself using optical sensors with an accuracy of 50 meters. Sancho would have retreated to a safe distance while Hidalgo hit the asteroid at around 10 km/s.
- Sancho would have then returned to its close orbit and observed how much the asteroid's shape, internal structure, orbit and rotation might have been affected by the impact.
- Sancho would then release the Autonomous Surface Package, a lander which would then free-fall toward the asteroid for two hours before landing. This package would have been directed towards the interior of the impact crater where it would investigate properties of the surface.

Don Quijote was one of six Near Earth Object precursor studies funded by ESA's General Studies Programme, other missions being: EUNEOS (European NEO Survey), Earthguard-I, NERO (NEO Remote Observations), SIMONE (Smallsat Intercept Missions to Objects Near Earth) and ISHTAR (Internal Structure High-resolution Tomography by Asteroid Rendezvous).

== Propulsion ==
The craft would have been launched by a Vega launcher and a Star 48 upper stage. The ESA considered two design options: the "Cheap Option" using a chemical propulsion system, and the "Flexible Option" using an electric propulsion system. The former would have been targeted to the Amor asteroid 2003 SM84, the latter to the asteroid 99942 Apophis.

== Instrumentation ==
=== Sancho (orbiter) ===
The instruments on the orbiter were classified into those essential to the success of the mission and those for the completion of extended mission objectives. The primary instruments were the Radio Science Experiment, Orbiter Camera, Imaging Laser Altimeter, and a LIDAR instrument. For the extended mission objectives, the orbiter would have carried an IR Spectrometer, a Thermal IR Imager, an X-Ray Spectrometer, a Radiation Monitor and the Autonomous Surface Package (ASP).

=== Hidalgo (impactor) ===
Unlike many other spacecraft, the goal of the Hidalgo impactor was to be as massive as possible upon reaching the target asteroid; because of this goal, the propulsion module would not have been jettisoned after use. The impactor was to carry few subsystems to make it as low-cost and maneuverable as possible. It would have had no moving appendages (solar panels, etc.) to complicate orientation, using only its RCS thrusters for course corrections, and it was to have a high-resolution targeting camera for ~50 m targeting accuracy on impact. The LISA Pathfinder design was considered an initial design reference.

== Target ==
Originally, the ESA identified two near-Earth asteroids as possible targets: 2002 AT4 and (10302) 1989 ML. Neither asteroid represents a threat to Earth. In a subsequent study, two different possibilities were selected: the Amor asteroid (612600) 2003 SM_{84} and 99942 Apophis; the latter is of particular significance to Earth as it will make a close approach in 2029 and 2036.

In 2005, the proposed mission was combined with AIDA, with the target selected as a binary asteroid, so that the effect of the deflection would be seen even from Earth by observing the period of the binary. The targets were 2002 AT_{4} and (10302) 1989 ML. The current target for AIDA is the binary asteroid 65803 Didymos.

== Names ==
The mission was named after the fictional Spanish knight from Miguel de Cervantes' renowned novel, Don Quixote, who charged against a windmill, thinking it to be a giant. Like Quixote, the Hidalgo spacecraft was to 'attack' an object much larger than itself, hopefully making impressive results. 'Sancho' was named after Sancho Panza, the Quixote's squire, who preferred to stay back and watch from a safe distance, which was the role assigned to that probe. Finally, the name Hidalgo was a minor Spanish title (roughly equivalent to a Baronet), now obsolete. In the novel, it was the title Alonso Quijano had even before becoming Don Quijote.

== See also ==
- List of asteroids visited by spacecraft
- Deep Impact – completed NASA comet impactor mission (2005).
- Hayabusa2 – JAXA asteroid probe carrying an impactor.
- SMART-1 – completed ESA lunar impact probe (2006).
