= 2002 AT4 =

Near-Earth asteroid

2002 AT_{4}
Discovery
- Discovered by: LINEAR
- Discovery site: Lincoln Lab's ETS
- Discovery date: 8 January 2002 (first observed only)

Designations
- Minor planet category: NEO · Amor · PHA

Orbital characteristics
- Epoch 21 November 2025 (JD 2461000.5)
- Uncertainty parameter 0
- Observation arc: 23.05 yr (8,420 d)
- Aphelion: 2.7001 AU
- Perihelion: 1.0328 AU
- Semi-major axis: 1.8665 AU
- Eccentricity: 0.4467
- Orbital period (sidereal): 2.55 yr (931 d)
- Mean anomaly: 107.876°
- Mean motion: 0° 23^{m} 11.4^{s} / day
- Inclination: 1.4981°
- Longitude of ascending node: 323.36°
- Argument of perihelion: 203.17°
- Earth MOID: 0.041 AU (16 LD)

Physical characteristics
- Mean diameter: 350 m (est. at 0.047)
- Spectral type: SMASS = D
- Absolute magnitude (H): 21.38

2002 AT_{4} is a near-Earth object and potentially hazardous asteroid of the Amor group, approximately 350 meters (1,100 feet) in diameter. It has an eccentric orbit that brings it sometimes close to Earth's orbit, and sometimes halfway between Mars and Jupiter. It is a dark D-type asteroid which means that it may be reddish in color.

Due to its relatively low transfer cost of ~5.5 km/s, 2002 AT_{4} was under consideration by the European Space Agency as a candidate target for the Don Quijote mission to study the effects of impacting a spacecraft into an asteroid; however, it is no longer under consideration.

2002 AT_{4} orbits the Sun at a distance of 1.0–2.7 AU once every 2 years and 7 months (932 days; semi-major axis of 1.87 AU). Its orbit has an eccentricity of 0.45 and an inclination of 1° with respect to the ecliptic.

T. M. Ribeiro et al. proposed a conceptual sample return mission named CARINA to 2002 AT_{4}. The goal of CARINA would be to return for the first time a sample from a D-type asteroid for an in-depth characterisation in Earth-based laboratories. Among other things, CARINA aims to: (i) explore the relationship between dark asteroids and comets; (ii) investigate the role of dark asteroids in the origin of life; (iii) improve our understanding of early Solar System evolution.
