= (612600) 2003 SM84 =

Near-Earth asteroid

(612600) 2003 SM_{84}
Discovery
- Discovered by: LINEAR
- Discovery site: Lincoln Laboratory ETS
- Discovery date: 20 September 2003 (first observed only)

Designations
- Minor planet category: NEO · Amor

Orbital characteristics
- Epoch 27 April 2019 (JD 2458600.5)
- Uncertainty parameter 1
- Observation arc: 18.24 yr (6,663 d)
- Aphelion: 1.2177 AU
- Perihelion: 1.0331 AU
- Semi-major axis: 1.1254 AU
- Eccentricity: 0.0820
- Orbital period (sidereal): 1.19 yr (436 d)
- Mean anomaly: 279.101°
- Mean motion: 0° 49^{m} 32.16^{s} / day
- Inclination: 2.7961°
- Longitude of ascending node: 186.633°
- Argument of perihelion: 87.375°
- Earth MOID: 0.0510 AU (19.8685 LD)

Physical characteristics
- Mean diameter: 75 m (est. at 0.20); 140 m (est. at 0.057)
- Absolute magnitude (H): 23.0

(612600) 2003 SM_{84} is a sub-kilometer asteroid, classified as near-Earth object of the Amor group orbiting between Earth and Mars. It was first observed by the Lincoln Near-Earth Asteroid Research (LINEAR) at the Lincoln Laboratory ETS on 20 September 2003. As of 2026, this minor planet has not been named.

2003 SM_{84} is an Amor asteroid – a subgroup of near-Earth asteroids that approach the orbit of Earth from beyond, but do not cross it. It orbits the Sun at a distance of 1.0–1.2 AU once every 14 months (436 days; semi-major axis of 1.22 AU). Its orbit has an eccentricity of 0.08 and an inclination of 3° with respect to the ecliptic. The body's observation arc begins with its first observation by LINEAR in 2003.

The object's spectral type remains unknown. Using a magnitude-to-diameter conversion, 2003 SM_{84} measures 75 and 140 meters in diameter, based on an absolute magnitude of 23.0 and an assumed albedo of 0.20 (S-type) and 0.057 (C-type), respectively. 2003 SM_{84} was being considered by the European Space Agency as a candidate target for the Don Quijote mission to study the effects of impacting a spacecraft into an asteroid.
