= 2022 OB5 =

Near-Earth asteroid

2022 OB_{5}
Discovery
- Discovery site: San Pedro de Atacama
- Discovery date: 30 July 2022

Designations
- Alternative designations: K22O05B
- Minor planet category: NEO · Apollo

Orbital characteristics
- Epoch 17 October 2024 (JD 2460600.5)
- Uncertainty parameter 4
- Observation arc: 9 days
- Earliest precovery date: 28 July 2022
- Aphelion: 1.068 AU
- Perihelion: 0.950 AU
- Semi-major axis: 1.009 AU
- Eccentricity: 0.05860
- Orbital period (sidereal): 1.013 yr (370 days)
- Mean anomaly: 334.06°
- Mean motion: 0° 58^{m} 21.752^{s} / day
- Inclination: 2.060°
- Longitude of ascending node: 302.69°
- Argument of perihelion: 105.71°
- Earth MOID: 0.00367 AU (549,000 km)

Physical characteristics
- Mean diameter: 3–13 m (9.8–42.7 ft)
- Synodic rotation period: 1.542±0.001 min
- Spectral type: M-type asteroid?
- Absolute magnitude (H): 28.92±0.423

2022 OB_{5} is a small near-Earth asteroid that passed within 0.00679 AU (1,016,000 km) from Earth on 5 August 2022. It was the primary target of AstroForge's Brokkr-2 (Odin) mission, which launched alongside IM-2 in February 2025, and was planned to reach the asteroid around December 2025. Communication issues ultimately prevented the mission from visiting the asteroid. It was selected for the mission as it is suspected to be a metallic M-type asteroid suitable for space mining in the future. However, its actual spectroscopic composition is not yet known. It was most recently observed on 6 February 2025.

== See also ==
- List of minor planets and comets visited by spacecraft
