= (185851) 2000 DP107 =

Near-Earth asteroid

(185851) 2000 DP_{107}
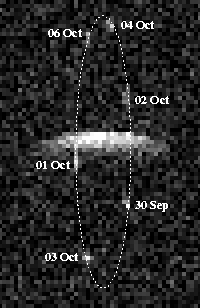
- Composite of radar images by the Arecibo Observatory from September to October 2000

Discovery
- Discovered by: LINEAR
- Discovery site: Lincoln Lab's ETS
- Discovery date: 29 February 2000

Designations
- Minor planet category: NEO · PHA · Apollo

Orbital characteristics
- Epoch 4 September 2017 (JD 2458000.5)
- Uncertainty parameter 0
- Observation arc: 16.82 yr (6,143 days)
- Aphelion: 1.8794 AU
- Perihelion: 0.8511 AU
- Semi-major axis: 1.3652 AU
- Eccentricity: 0.3766
- Orbital period (sidereal): 1.60 yr (583 days)
- Mean anomaly: 255.78°
- Mean motion: 0° 37^{m} 4.44^{s} / day
- Inclination: 8.6718°
- Longitude of ascending node: 358.70°
- Argument of perihelion: 289.74°
- Known satellites: 1
- Earth MOID: 0.0150 AU · 5.8 LD

Physical characteristics
- Dimensions: 0.860 km (taken); 0.863±0.043 km 1.0±0.1 km
- Synodic rotation period: 2.769±0.005 h 2.774±0.001 h 2.77447±0.00005 h 2.7745±0.0007 h 2.7754±0.0002 h 2.7754 h
- Geometric albedo: 0.111±0.036; 0.15 (derived)
- Spectral type: M · C
- Absolute magnitude (H): 18.0 · 18.0±0.2 (R) · 18.02±0.2 · 18.03±0.1 · 18.2

(185851) 2000 DP_{107} is a sub-kilometer sized asteroid, classified as a potentially hazardous asteroid and near-Earth object of the Apollo group that is notable because it provided evidence for binary asteroids in the near-Earth population. The PROCYON probe developed by JAXA and the University of Tokyo was intended to flyby this asteroid before its ion thruster failed and could not be restarted.

== Discovery ==
The asteroid was discovered on 29 February 2000, by the Lincoln Near-Earth Asteroid Research (LINEAR) program at Lincoln Laboratory's Experimental Test Site, near Socorro, New Mexico.

The binary nature of this asteroid was suggested from radar observations taken with the Goldstone radar antenna on 22 and 23 September 2000, based on an observing proposal by J.-L. Margot and observations by S. J. Ostro and colleagues. Confirming observations were obtained with the Arecibo telescope from 30 September to 7 October 2000.

== Orbit ==
2000 DP_{107} orbits the Sun at a distance of 0.9–1.9 AU once every 19 months (583 days). Its orbit has an eccentricity of 0.38 and an inclination of 9° with respect to the ecliptic. The body's observation arc begins with its official discovery observation, as no precoveries were taken, and no prior identifications were made.

== Binary system ==
The 800-meter-diameter primary and the 300-meter-diameter secondary orbit each other with a separation of 2.6 kilometers and a period of 1.76 days.

The primary is spheroidal and is spinning at a rate near the breakup point for strengthless bodies. These two features were observed in multiple binary systems, suggesting that near-Earth asteroid binaries form by a mechanism involving spin-up and mass shedding. Currently the most generally accepted spin-up mechanism is the YORP effect.

== Physical characteristics ==
The asteroid is characterized as both a carbonaceous C-type and metallic M-type asteroid.

The density of the primary was calculated using the orbital elements of the binary system, the primary-to-secondary mass ratio, and estimates of the primary size. The primary has a low density of 1.7 g/cm^{3}, which may indicate a "rubble pile" structure containing rocks and voids.

== Numbering and naming ==
This minor planet was numbered by the Minor Planet Center on 20 May 2008. As of 2018, it has not been named.

== See also ==
- List of minor planets and comets visited by spacecraft
