= AstroForge =

American aerospace company

- Type: Private
- Industry: Aerospace
- Founded: January 10, 2022
- Founder: Matt Gialich; Jose Acain
- Headquarters: Huntington Beach, California, United States
- Website: www.astroforge.com

AstroForge is an aerospace company based in Huntington Beach, California. The company is working on developing asteroid mining technologies, aiming to become the first commercial entity to do so. As of 2024, no commercial asteroid mining efforts have been successful, although several government-led missions have successfully returned asteroid samples.

== History ==
AstroForge was founded on January 10, 2022 by Matthew Gialich and Jose Acain, aiming to become the first asteroid mining company. AstroForge raised about $13 million in seed funding, and worked on developing technologies aimed to process asteroid materials. In 2023, the company had over twenty employees.

In April 2023, AstroForge launched its first mission via the SpaceX's Falcon 9 rocket on its Transporter-7 rideshare mission and built by the aerospace company OrbAstro, the AstroForge 6U cubesat called Brokkr-1 was sent into Low Earth Orbit to test asteroid material refinement technologies. The aim was to separate precious metals like platinum from general materials like iron. The mission failed because of communication problems. On October 18, 2023, AstroForge completed a successful test of the flight propulsion system for their next mission, Odin.

Odin launched on 27 February 2025 as a rideshare of the IM-2 lunar mission; it failed due to ground station and communication issues.

== Goals ==
AstroForge's goal is the extraction, refinement, and sale of platinum-group metals (PGMs) located within M-type asteroids near to Earth. These asteroids are generally quite small in comparison to main belt asteroids, being anywhere from around 20 to 300 meters in diameter. M-type asteroids are also believed to account for about 3-5% of all Near Earth Asteroids (NEAs). AstroForge considers five different asteroids that fit these qualifications as potential mining targets in future operations. Unlike other companies that were involved with space resources industries that had an interest in extracting water ice within asteroids and splitting it into hydrogen and oxygen to create interplanetary fuel depots, AstroForge is not interested in this concept due to the lack of a current market for interplanetary fuel depots.

Although there have been a number of robotic missions that have returned asteroid material to Earth (JAXA's Hayabusa and Hayabusa2 probes along with NASA's Osiris-REx probe), the process has yet to be commercialized, or completed on an M-type asteroid given that the past research targets of JAXA and NASA were C-type asteroids.

== Spacecraft ==
Spacecraft are named after figures in Norse mythology.

=== Brokkr-1 ===
Brokkr-1, built by the British satellite manufacturer, OrbAstro, was AstroForge's first orbital spacecraft consisting of a 6U cubesat. Its main purpose was to demonstrate technology to extract metals from asteroid materials. The payload was expected to vaporize “asteroid-like” material and sort out metals from other constituents.

The Brokkr-1 satellite, faced immediate challenges after its launch on April 15, 2023, aboard a SpaceX Transporter-7 rocket. The company struggled to identify its satellite among the 50 other spacecraft in the mission, a problem that was compounded by a malfunction during the deployment of the solar panel array. The magnetic field generated by the satellite's refining system interfered with its orientation system, making it difficult to align the antenna and fully deploy the solar panels.

AstroForge revealed that they had identified the magnetic field issue before the launch but chose to proceed with the mission despite the risk. They opted to avoid a nine-month delay and the associated launch costs, even though it meant the satellite could potentially end up in a wobble that might disrupt communication.

In searching for the lost Brokkr-1, AstroForge noted that in the following weeks they established connections with space companies that had ground assets that could "help in identifying our satellite." On May 5, 2023, the first positive signal was received, which confirmed through telemetry that the satellite was in good condition.

=== Odin (Brokkr-2) ===
AstroForge's second demonstration spacecraft, initially designated Brokkr-2 and later renamed Odin, was also built by OrbAstro but used a larger 100-kilogram satellite bus, and cost the company US$3.5 million. Odin's mission was to perform a flyby of a near-Earth asteroid and determine whether the asteroid is metallic. The spacecraft was launched into a heliocentric orbit as a rideshare payload of the IM-2 lunar mission, with a number of other payloads on 27 February 2025. Its spacecraft bus was completely rebuilt in-house, mostly from scratch, after the spacecraft failed vibration testing. On 29 January 2025, the company announced that Odin would be targeting near-Earth object 2022 OB5 for visitation, flying by the object 301 days after launch in December 2025. The asteroid was selected in part due to its suspected metallic composition, and its proximity to Earth during the spacecraft encounter. Following the launch, Odin encountered communication issues. On 6 March 2025, the company officially declared Odin lost despite sporadic communication with the spacecraft from an AMSAT amateur radio operator in Germany, primarily due to ground station failures.

=== DeepSpace-2 ===
The third demonstration spacecraft, DeepSpace-2, will return to the same targeted metallic asteroid and land/dock with it. It plans to be launched with Intuitive Machines’ IM-3 mission, which currently planned to launch in the second half of 2026.
