= AIDA (international space cooperation) =

Proposed asteroid space missions

- Mission type: Dual asteroid probes
- Operator: ESA / NASA
- Website: AIDA study

Start of mission
- Launch date: DART: 24 November 2021, 06:21:02 UTC; Hera: 7 October 2024, 14:52:11 UTC
- Rocket: DART: Falcon 9; Hera: Falcon 9

Dimorphos impactor
- Spacecraft component: DART
- Impact date: 26 September 2022

(65803) Didymos orbiter
- Spacecraft component: Hera, Milani, Juventas
- Orbital insertion: 14 December 2026

The Asteroid Impact and Deflection Assessment (AIDA) missions are a proposed pair of space probes which will study and demonstrate the kinetic effects of crashing an impactor spacecraft into an asteroid moon. The mission is intended to test and validate impact models of whether a spacecraft could successfully deflect an asteroid on a collision course with Earth.

The original plan called for a European spacecraft, the Asteroid Impact Mission (AIM), to operate in synergy with a large NASA impactor called Double Asteroid Redirection Test (DART) and observe the immediate effects of the impact. AIM was cancelled in 2016 when Germany was unable to fund its portion, and after some backlash within European Space Agency (ESA), AIM was replaced in 2018 with a smaller spacecraft called Hera that launched three years after DART to orbit and study the crater on the asteroid. Hera will also deploy two European CubeSats in deep space for close-up asteroid surveying: Juventas and Milani.

DART impacted Dimorphos, the asteroid moonlet of 65803 Didymos, on 26 September 2022. Hera will arrive at Didymos in December 2026, four years and three months after DART's impact.

== History ==
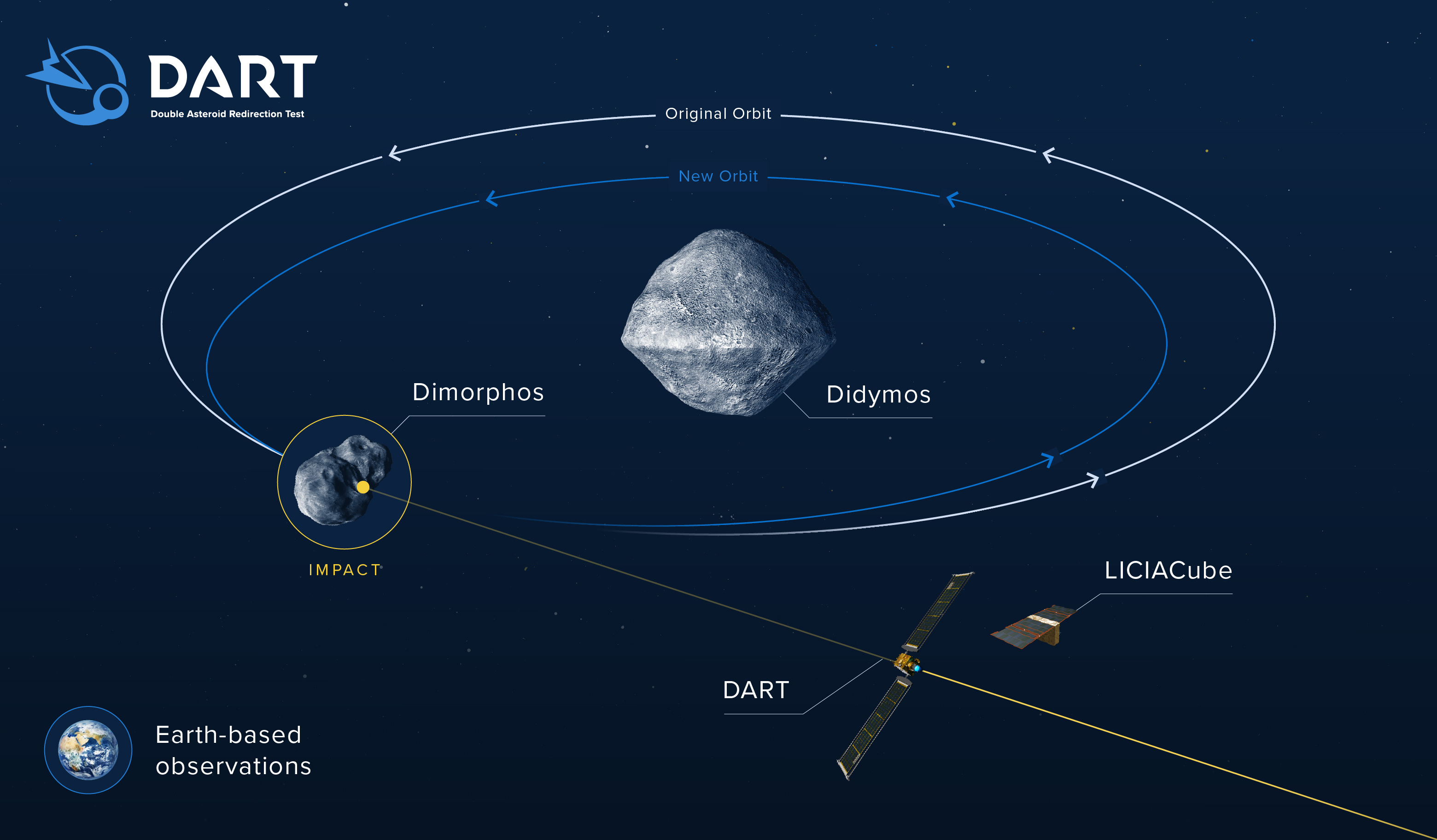
Infographic showing the effect of DART's impact on the orbit of Didymos B with deployment of LICIACube

Initially, Hera's role was to be realized by a much larger spacecraft called Asteroid Impact Mission (AIM), that would have observed the plume, the crater, and the freshly exposed material to provide unique information for asteroid deflection, science and mining communities. In December 2016, the European Space Agency (ESA) cancelled the development of the AIM spacecraft after Germany decided to fund the ExoMars project only. Germany offered to cover only 35 million of the 60 million needed for the AIM portion to continue, and this was not enough to continue development. Had AIM been developed, its notional requirements in 2012 were:

- an asteroid lander (based on the German MASCOT heritage) for in-situ measurements
- a thermal infrared imager to discriminate different surface properties like rocks or granular surfaces
- a monostatic high frequency radar to obtain information on the structure of the asteroid's surface
- a bistatic low frequency radar (on the orbiter and on the lander) to allow a view inside the asteroid and obtain data on its inner structure
- two interplanetary CubeSats
- deep-space optical communication.

Under the original proposal, AIM would have launched in October 2020, and DART in July 2021. AIM would have orbited the larger asteroid and studied the composition of it and its moon. DART would then impact the asteroid's moon in October 2022, during a close approach to Earth. AIM would have studied the asteroid's strength, surface physical properties and internal structure, as well as measured the effect on the asteroid moon's orbit around the larger asteroid.

Nevertheless, NASA has continued development of the DART mission to 65803 Didymos and plans to measure the effects of the impact from ground-based telescopes, and from an Italian CubeSat DART will bring along. Following AIM's cancellation, ESA director Jan Wörner stated his intentions to revive the European mission in some form. Etienne Schneider, Luxembourg's deputy prime minister, expressed regret at AIM's cancellation, and commented that his country would continue to advocate for the realization of the mission.

=== Status ===
By March 2018, Hera proposal was in Phase B1, where the preliminary design was being drawn up. On 7 January 2019, the Hera team announced the selection of two CubeSats to piggyback on the mission: APEX and Juventas. ESA officials approved Hera in November 2019 for a 2024 launch. In September 2020 ESA awarded a contract covering the detailed design, manufacturing, and testing of Hera. In this occasion the APEX CubeSat is also substituted by the Milani one, named after the late Andrea Milani, distinguished professor and leading asteroid scientist.

The Italian Space Agency (ASI) decided in 2018 to contribute to NASA a secondary spacecraft called LICIACube (Light Italian CubeSat for Imaging of Asteroids), a 6-unit CubeSat that piggybacked with DART and separated 15 days before impact on 11 September 2022 to acquire images of the ejecta as it drifts past the asteroid. LICIACube is equipped with two optical science cameras, dubbed LUKE and LEIA.

== Collaboration ==
The AIDA mission is a joint international collaboration of the European Space Agency (ESA), the German Aerospace Center (DLR), Côte d'Azur Observatory (OCA), NASA, and Johns Hopkins University Applied Physics Laboratory (JHU/APL).

The miniature lidar instrument on board Hera will be provided by a consortium of teams from Portugal, Poland, and Ireland. Two CubeSats will be deployed by Hera while at Didymos: The Milani CubeSat is being developed by Italy, Czech Republic, and Finland. The Juventas CubeSat is being developed by GomSpace and GMV's Romanian division.

Along with surveying DART's impact crater, Hera may also carry a Japanese impactor that would be a replica of the Small Carry-on Impactor (SCI), on board the Hayabusa2 asteroid sample return mission. NASA's DART brought a 6U flyby CubeSat along with it, called LICIACube, which was developed by the Italian Space Agency (ASI) to image the ejecta plume.

== DART and LICIACube ==
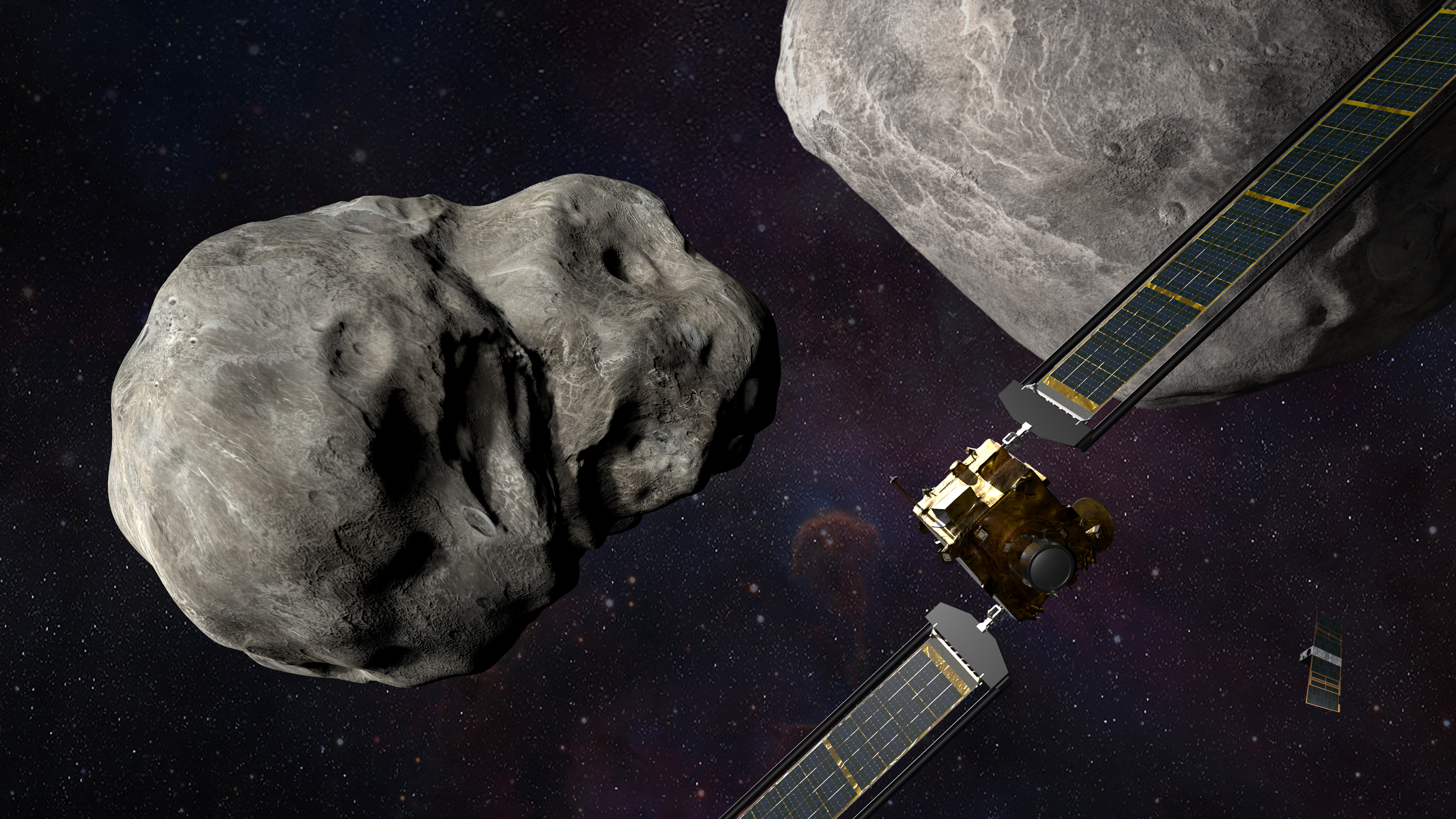
Illustration of the DART impactor spacecraft and LICIACube approaching Dimorphos.

DART or Double Asteroid Redirection Test was a 500 kg (1,100 lb) impactor that hosted a single camera, Didymos Reconnaissance and Asteroid Camera for Optical Navigation (DRACO), derived from LORRI camera aboard New Horizons, to support autonomous guiding to impact the center of the moon of Didymos B. It also carried an Italian-built cubesat called LICIACube that was released pre-impact on 11 September 2022 to image the event. It is estimated that the impact of the 500 kg (1,100 lb) DART at 6 km/s (3.7 mi/s) will produce a velocity change on the order of 0.4 mm/s, which leads to a small change in the orbit of Didymos B, but over time, a large change in the orbital position (or orbital phase). DART impacted Dimorphos on 26 September 2022.

DART Mission animated video from launch to impact along with separation of LICIACube

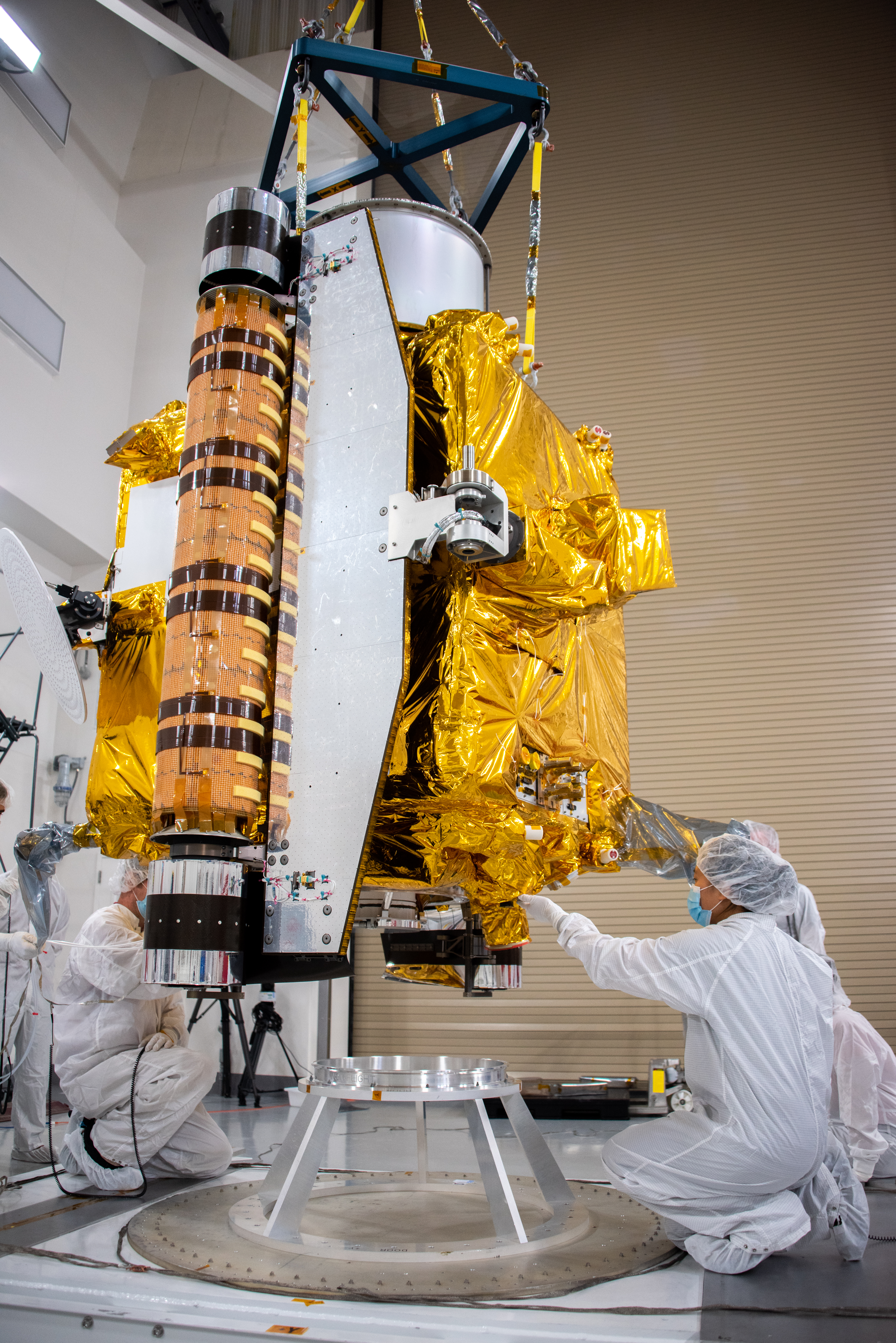
DART in launch configuration

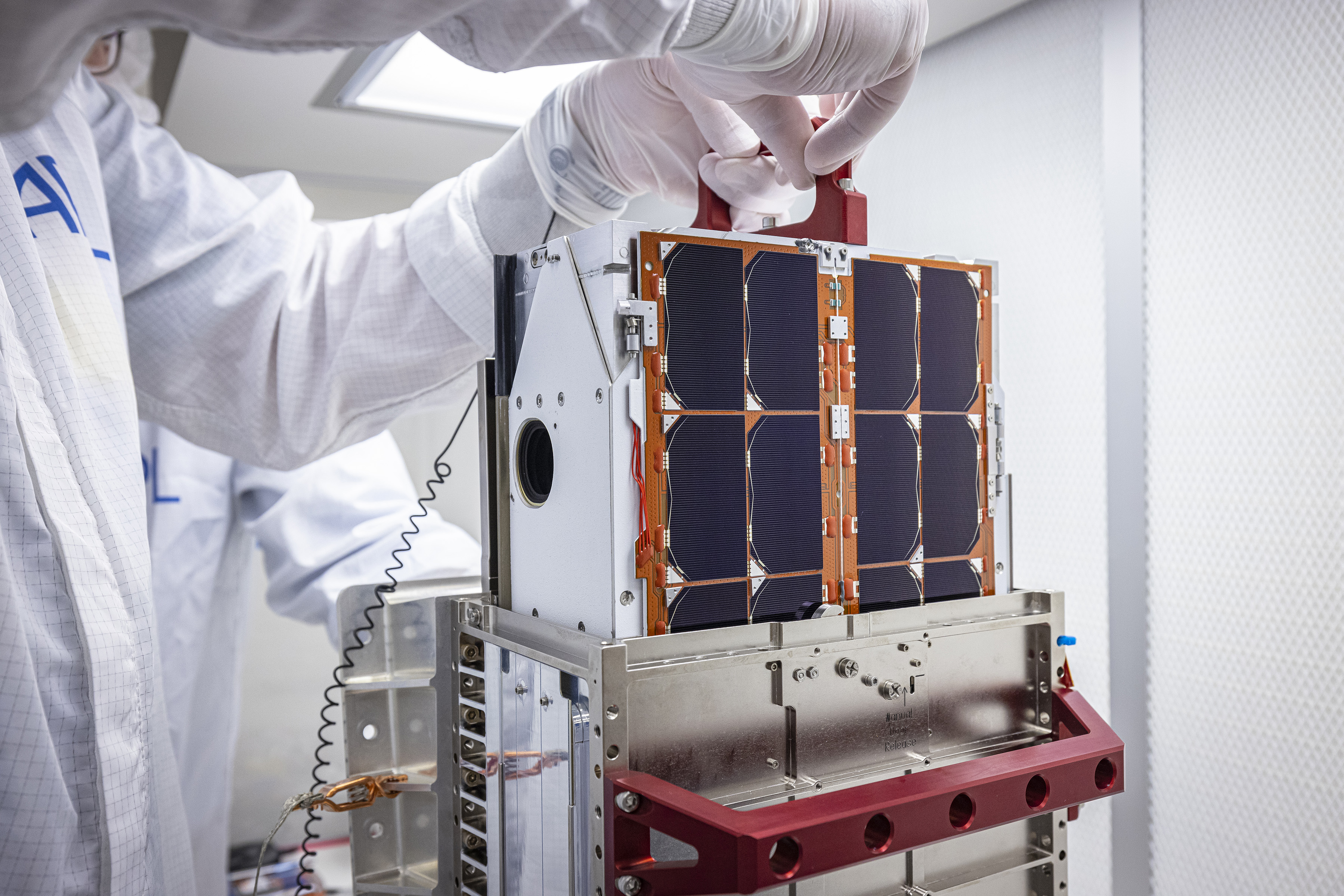
LICIACube, a companion satellite of the DART probe

== Hera ==
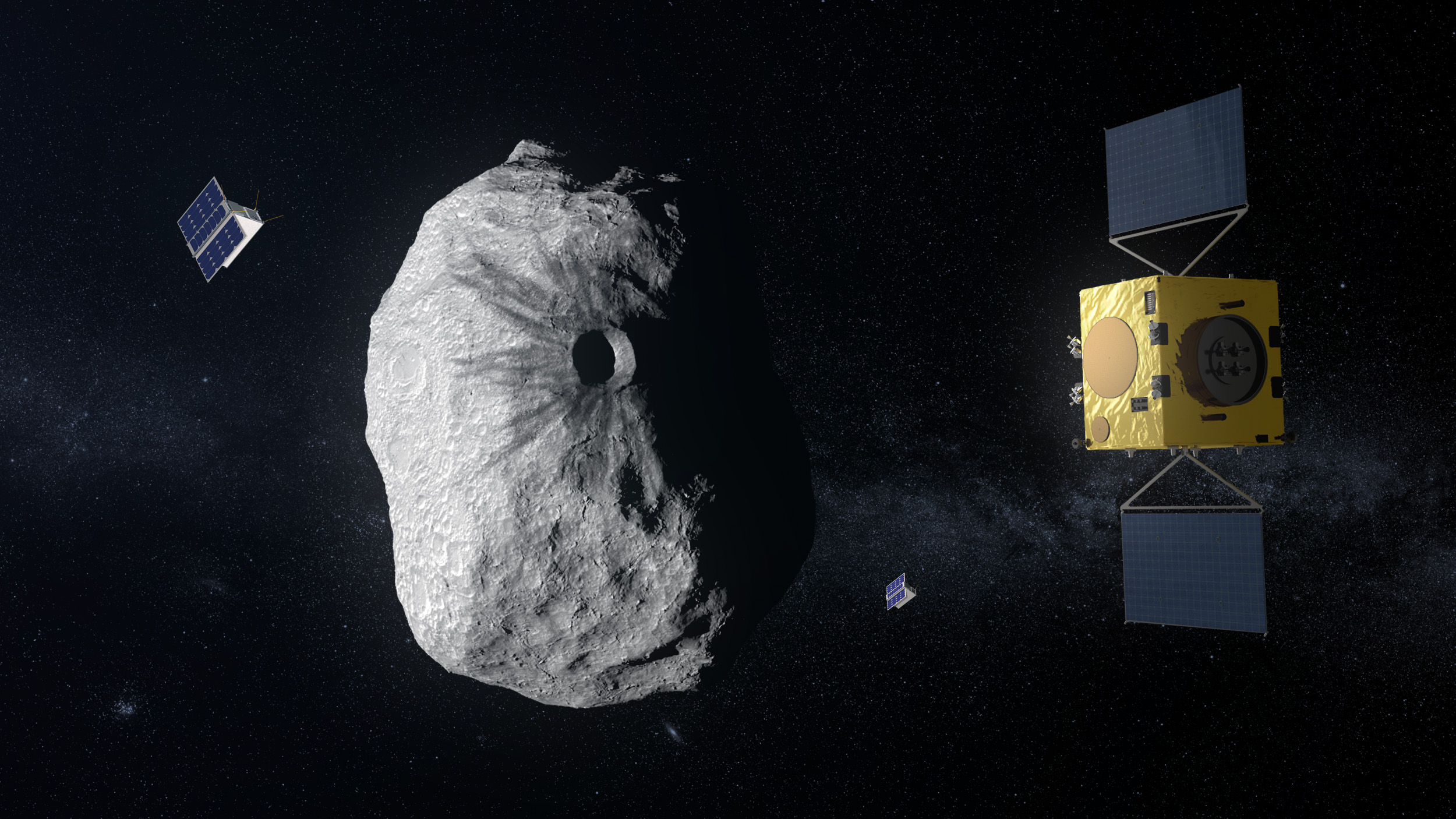
Hera probe and its 2 CubeSats, Milani and Juventas

Hera is the European component of the ESA–NASA AIDA mission. The Hera spacecraft, approved on 29 November 2019, will focus on key measurements to validate impact and asteroid deflection models, such as the detailed characterisation of the impact crater made by the DART impactor. Hera will also measure the DART impact outcome, such as change in the binary system orbit, and will enable detailed characterisation of the Dimorphos volume and surface properties, as well as measure the volume and morphology of the DART impact crater.

The baseline payload of Hera includes a camera, a miniaturized lidar and two CubeSats dedicated to asteroid characterisation. The spacecraft design allows for 40 kilograms (88 lb) of additional payload mass, including the Small Carry-on Impactor (SCI) proposed by Japan's space agency JAXA. Other options, such as a small lander, are being considered. Hera was launched on a Falcon 9 on 7 October 2024.

=== Proposed payload ===
The notional payloads on Hera are:

- Asteroid Framing Camera to obtain information on the dynamics of a binary asteroid and physical characteristics.
- Lidar laser altimeter to measure the shapes of the two bodies and constrain the mass of the asteroid's moon.
- Thermal imager
- Milani is a 6-unit CubeSat carrying the ASPECT visual and near-IR imaging spectrometer and VISTA for dust characterization. Milani will study the binary system surface composition, and perform technology demonstration experiments related to the inter-satellite link (ISL) and autonomous optical navigation. The CubeSat will operate for 3–6 months in the vicinity of the system.
- Juventas is a 6-unit CubeSat carrying a camera and a low-frequency radar (JuRa), for determining the internal structure of Dimorphos. It will operate for 3–6 months near the asteroid. At the end of its mission, it will attempt a landing on the surface of Dimorphos to obtain close-up data.

== Mission design ==
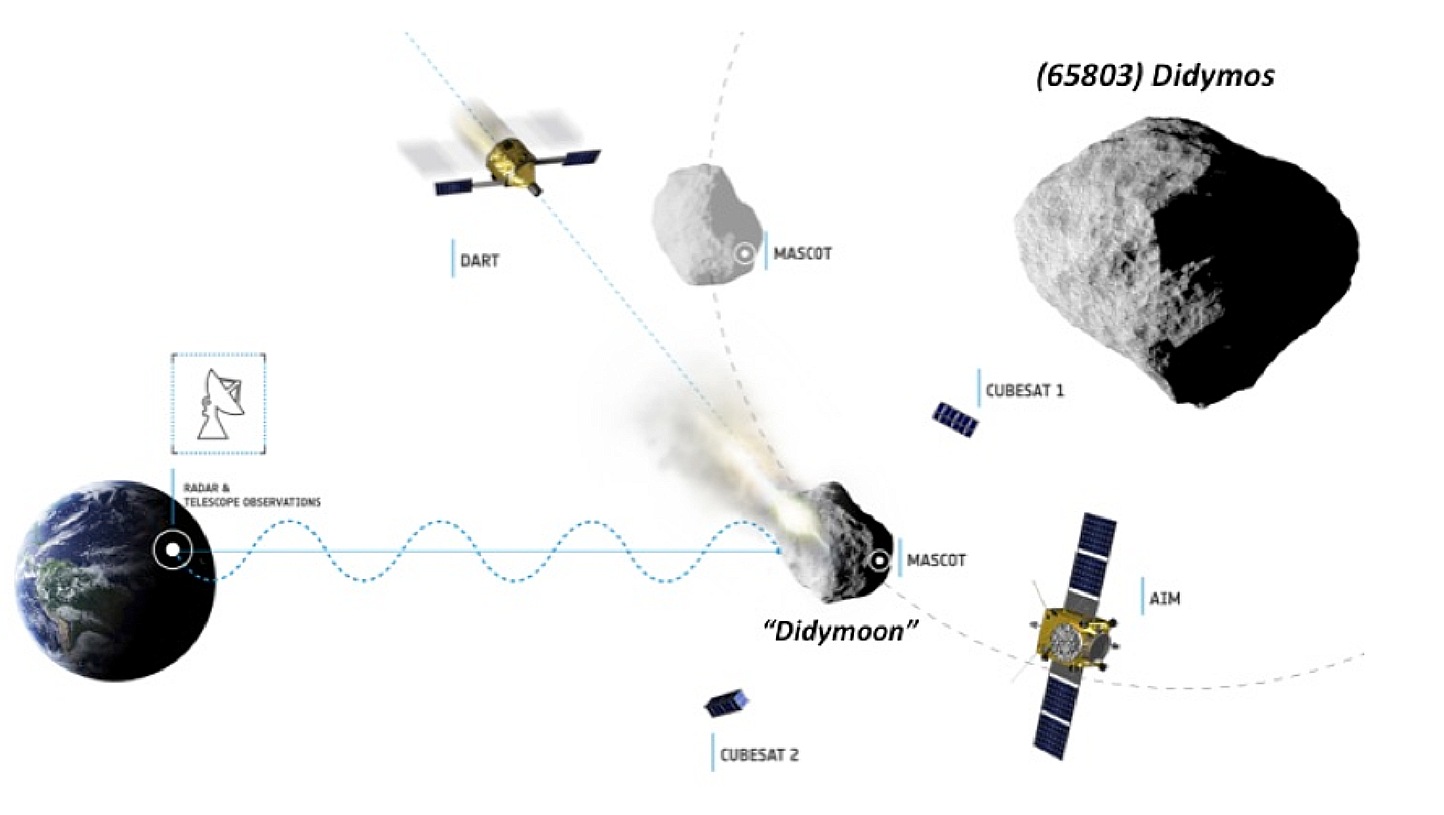
Schematic showing the progress of the mission. In the current proposal AIM is replaced with Hera, there is no MASCOT, and the CubeSats are now envisioned to be 6U instead of 3U

AIDA will target 65803 Didymos, a binary asteroid system in which one asteroid is orbited by a smaller one. The primary asteroid is about 800 metres (2,600 ft) in diameter; its small satellite is about 150 metres (490 ft) in diameter in an orbit about 1.1 km (0.68 mi) from the primary. Didymos is not an Earth-crossing asteroid, and there is no possibility that the deflection experiment could create an impact hazard to Earth.

The impact of the 300 kilograms (660 lb) DART spacecraft at 6.25 km/s was designed to produce a velocity change on the order of 0.4 mm/s, which would lead to a significant change in the mutual orbit of these two objects, but only a minimal change in the heliocentric orbit of the system. AIDA was designed to provide a great benefit obtaining the size of the resulting impact crater in addition to the momentum transfer measurement, as the effects of porosity and strength of the target are needed to calculate the momentum transfer efficiency.

DART impacted the small moon of the asteroid Didymos on 26 September 2022, while Hera would arrive at Didymos in 2027, five years after DART's impact. To maximize scientific outcome, the AIDA team had proposed to delay DART's launch so that Hera would arrive at the asteroid first, enabling it to study DART's impact, the plume, the crater, and the freshly exposed material. While most of the initial objectives of AIDA would still be met if Hera arrives after DART, as a drawback, data from direct observation of the impact and ejecta will not be obtained.

=== Analysis of the DART impact ===
Analysis of the asteroid 65803 Didymos and its moon Dimorphos after the DART mission showed a reduction in Didymos's orbital period of 33 ± 1.0 minutes, reducing the overall period to an estimated 11.372 ± 0.017 hours. Additionally, observations from the Lowell Observatory and their collaborators measured a -2.63 ± 0.6 mm s^{-1} reduction in Dimorphos's track velocity. Measurements from the Lowell Observatory collaboration also noted that the shape of Dimorphos changed significantly from an oblate spheroid to an elongated ellipsoid.

=== AIDA mission architecture ===
Host spacecraft	Secondary spacecraft	Remarks
DART	LICIACube	By the Italian Space Agency; 6U CubeSat; LUKE (LICIACube Unit Key Explorer) Camera and LEIA (LICIACube Explorer Imaging for Asteroid) Camera
Hera	Juventas	By GomSpace and GMV; 6U CubeSat orbiter; Camera, JuRa monostatic low-frequency radar, accelerometers, and gravimeter; Will attempt to land on the asteroid surface
Hera	Milani	By Italy/Czech/Finnish consortium; 6U CubeSat orbiter; VIS/Near-IR spectrometer, volatile analyzer; Will characterize Didymos and Dimorphos surface composition and the dust environment around the system; Will perform technology demonstration experiments

== See also ==
- Asteroid impact avoidance
- B612 Foundation
- Don Quijote, AIDA's predecessor proposal
- The Spaceguard Foundation
