= PROCYON =

Japanese space probe (2014–2015)

- Mission type: Asteroid flyby, technology demonstration
- Operator: University of Tokyo / JAXA
- COSPAR ID: 2014-076D
- SATCAT no.: 40322
- Website: PROCYON on University of Tokyo site

Spacecraft properties
- Launch mass: Total: 67 kg (148 lb)
- Dry mass: 64.5 kg (142 lb)
- Dimensions: 0.55 × 0.55 × 0.67 m (1.8 × 1.8 × 2.2 ft)
- Power: 25

Start of mission
- Launch date: 3 December 2014, 04:22 UTC
- Rocket: H-IIA 202
- Launch site: LA-Y, Tanegashima Space Center

End of mission
- Last contact: 3 December 2015

Flyby of Earth
- Closest approach: 3 December 2015

Flyby of (185851) 2000 DP107
- Closest approach: Intended: 2016

PROCYON (Proximate Object Close flyby with Optical Navigation) was an asteroid flyby space probe that was launched together with Hayabusa2 on 3 December 2014 13:22:04 (JST). It was developed by University of Tokyo and JAXA. It was a small (70 kg, approx. 60 cm cube), low cost (¥500 million) spacecraft.

It was intended to flyby the asteroid (185851) 2000 DP107 in 2016, but the plan was abandoned due to the malfunction of the ion thruster.

== Mission overview ==
PROCYON was launched as secondary payload together with the Hayabusa2 asteroid landing probe. After separation from the carrier rocket, PROCYON was left on a heliocentric orbit. On 22 February 2015, the ion engine was started, with the intention of adjusting the orbit so that an Earth flyby in December 2015 would direct the probe towards asteroid 2000 DP_{107}. Initial results were favourable - the engine delivered 330 μN of thrust rather than the designed 250 μN - but the engine failed on 10 March and could not be restarted; PROCYON flew past Earth on 3 December 2015, but was unable to make a controlled orbit change. Shortly after the Earth flyby, contact with the spacecraft was lost.

The 70 kg spacecraft had a specific impulse of 1000 seconds, for a delta-v budget of about 500 m/s; the intention was to use 20% of the xenon propellant for the initial orbit correction, and the rest of the propellant between the Earth flyby and the asteroid flyby to ensure a controlled flyby distance of 30 km.

A novel subsystem tested by PROCYON involved feeding both the main ion engine and the eight attitude control cold-gas thrusters from the same tank (containing 2.5 kg of xenon at launch)

== Instruments ==
- Small telescope for near-asteroid navigation and data acquisition.
- Lyman-alpha imaging camera to observe geocorona

== Science results ==
PROCYON observed the Lyman-alpha emission of comet 67P/Churyumov–Gerasimenko to determine its overall coma structure. PROCYON captured the first complete image of the geocorona, confirming for the first time that it has north–south symmetry.

== See also ==
- 2014 in spaceflight
