= 65803 Didymos =

Near-Earth asteroid

- Asteroid Didymos as photographed by the Hera space probe on 6 November 2026

Discovery
- Discovered by: Spacewatch
- Discovery site: Kitt Peak National Observatory
- Discovery date: 11 April 1996

Designations
- Pronunciation: /ˈdɪdɪmɒs/
- Named after: Greek word for "Twin"
- Alternative designations: 1996 GT
- Minor planet category: NEO · PHA; Apollo (2022) (Note: It is an Apollo asteroid because perihelion (q) is less than 1.017 AU (Earth aphelion), not greater.)

Orbital characteristics
- Epoch 21 January 2022 (JD 2459600.5)
- Uncertainty parameter 0
- Observation arc: 24.82 years (9,066 days)
- Aphelion: 2.2753 AU
- Perihelion: 1.0131 AU
- Semi-major axis: 1.6442 AU
- Eccentricity: 0.38385
- Orbital period (sidereal): 2.11 yr (770 days)
- Mean anomaly: 232.01
- Mean motion: 0° 28^{m} 2.28^{s} / day
- Inclination: 3.4079°
- Longitude of ascending node: 73.196°
- Argument of perihelion: 319.32°
- Known satellites: 1 (Dimorphos)
- Earth MOID: 0.0403 AU (15.7 LD)
- Mars MOID: 0.02 AU (7.8 LD)

Physical characteristics
- Dimensions: 851 × 849 × 620 m (± 15 × 15 × 15 m)
- Mean diameter: 765±15 m (Note: Volume-equivalent spherical diameter is calculated from an ellipsoid's volume given Didymos's dimensions of 851 × 849 × 620 m, and then solving for radius with $r = \sqrt[3]{3 V \over 4 \pi }$.)
- Mass: (5.4±0.4)×10^{11} kg (system) ≈5.2×10^{11} kg (primary)
- Mean density: 2.40±0.30 g/cm^{3}
- Synodic rotation period: 2.2600±0.0001; 2.2593±0.0002 h
- Axial tilt: 174°±20° (Note: Naidu et al. (2020) give the Didymos's north pole direction in terms of ecliptic coordinates, where λ is ecliptic longitude and β is ecliptic latitude. β is the angular offset from the ecliptic plane whereas inclination i with respect to the ecliptic is the angular offset from the ecliptic north pole at β = +90°; i with respect to the ecliptic would be the complement of β. Therefore, given β = –84°, i = 90° – (–84°) = 174° from the ecliptic.)
- Pole ecliptic longitude: 310°±20°
- Pole ecliptic latitude: −84°±20°
- Geometric albedo: 0.15±0.04
- Spectral type: S · SMASS = Xk · X
- Absolute magnitude (H): 18.0 · 18.16; 18.16±0.03

65803 Didymos (provisional designation 1996 GT) is a sub-kilometer asteroid and binary system that is classified as a potentially hazardous asteroid and near-Earth object of the Apollo group. The asteroid was discovered in 1996 by the Spacewatch survey at Kitt Peak, and its small 160-meter minor-planet moon, named Dimorphos, was discovered in 2003. Due to its binary nature, the asteroid was then named Didymos, the Greek word for 'twin'.

Didymos's moon, Dimorphos, was the target of the DART mission to test the viability of asteroid impact avoidance by collision with a spacecraft, while the impact was witnessed by LICIACube, a flyby CubeSat component of the mission. The aftermath of the impact is now being surveyed by the Hera spacecraft.

== Discovery ==
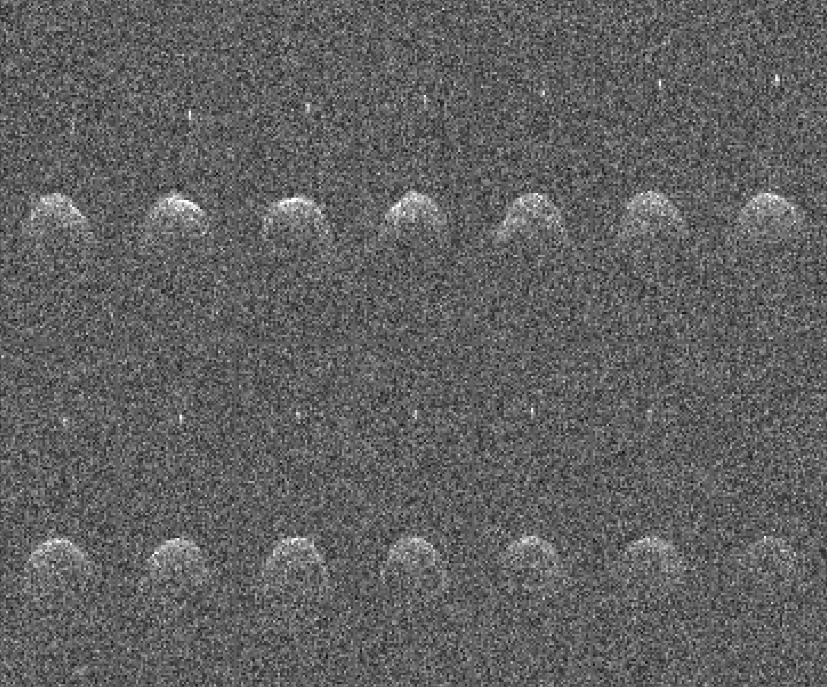
Radar images of Didymos and its satellite Dimorphos, taken by the Arecibo Observatory in 2003

Didymos was discovered on 11 April 1996 by the University of Arizona Steward Observatory's, and Lunar and Planetary Laboratory's, Spacewatch survey using its 0.9-meter telescope at Kitt Peak National Observatory in Arizona, United States. The binary nature of the asteroid was discovered by others; suspicions of binarity first arose in Goldstone delay-Doppler echoes, and these were confirmed with an optical lightcurve analysis, along with Arecibo radar imaging on 23 November 2003.

== Orbital characteristics ==
Didymos orbits the Sun at a distance of 1.0–2.3 AU once every 770 days (2 years and 1 month). Its orbit has an eccentricity of 0.38 and an inclination of 3° with respect to the ecliptic. The minimum distance between the orbit of Earth and the orbit of Didymos is currently 0.04 AU (6.0 million km), but will change as the asteroid is perturbed. In November 2003 it passed 7.18 million km from Earth; it will not come that near again until November 2123, with a distance of 5.86 million km. Didymos also occasionally passes very close to Mars: it will fly by Mars at a distance of 4.68 million km in July 2144. The Earth approach of October 2184, at a distance of 8.6 million km, is listed with an uncertainty region of roughly ±105 km.

Didymos spends one third of its time orbiting far enough from the Sun to cross the inner parts of the main asteroid belt, where collisions with other asteroids are more probable. This means that about every 73–84 thousand years, an object impacts Didymos with the energy of the DART mission satellite. Over its median NEA lifetime of 8 to 10 million years, Didymos probably has been hit several tens of times.

== Physical characteristics ==
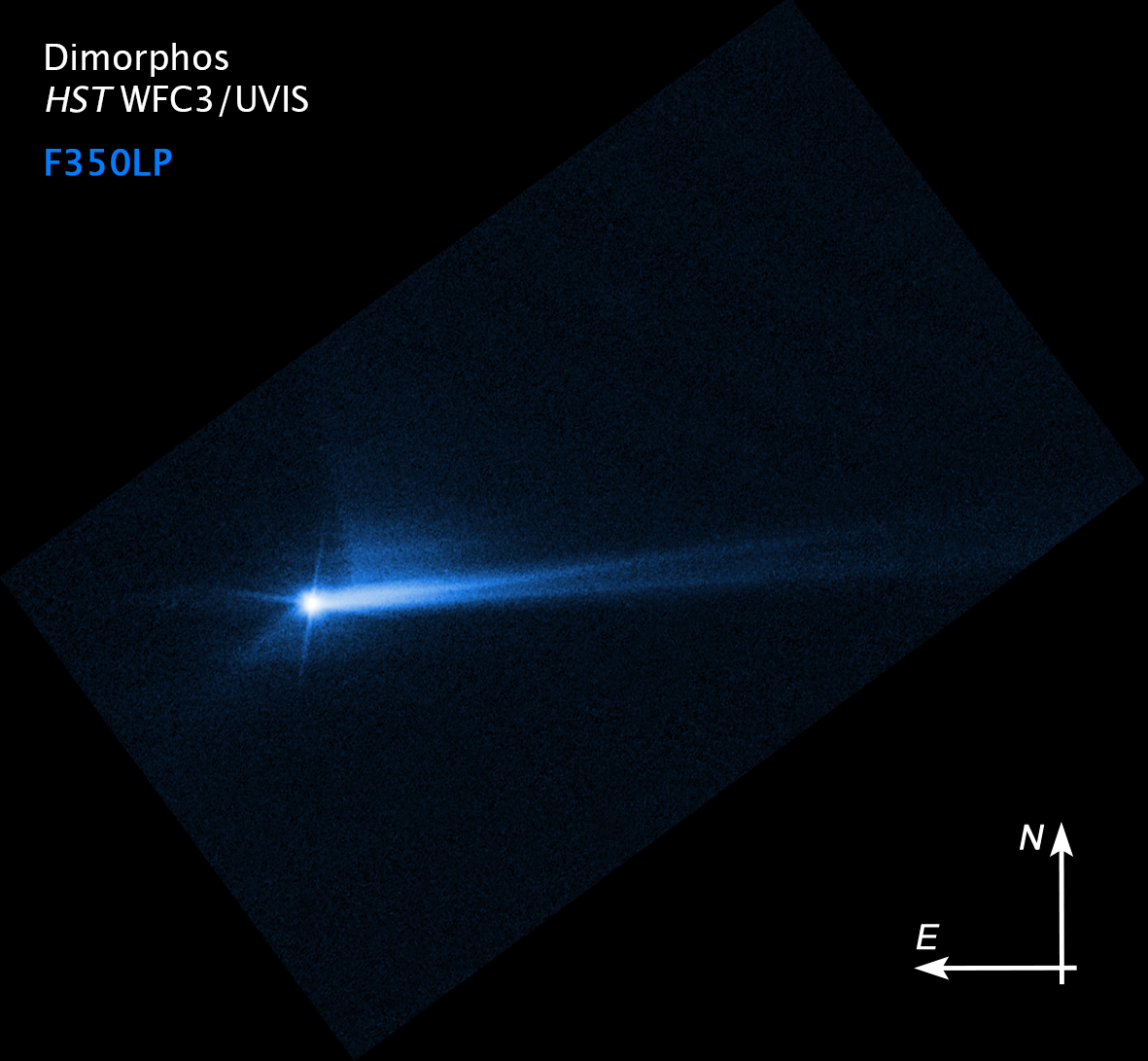
Double tail of Didymos imaged by the Hubble Space Telescope 12 days after DART's impact

In the SMASS classification, Didymos was classified as an Xk-type asteroid, which transitions from the X-type to the rare K-type asteroids. Subsequent visible and near-infrared spectroscopy showed it to be silicate in nature, which also qualifies it as a stony S-type asteroid. It rotates rapidly, with a period of 2.26 hours and a low brightness variation of 0.08 magnitude (U=3/3), which indicates that the body has a nearly spheroidal shape. Radar observations confirmed this spheroidal shape, showing it to be oblate due to its rapid rotation.

=== Satellite ===
Didymos is a binary asteroid with a satellite in its orbit. The minor-planet moon, named Dimorphos, moves in a mostly circular retrograde orbit with an orbital period of 11.9 hours. (Note: Lightcurve plots of 65803 Didymos, Palmer Divide Observatory, B. D. Warner) It measures approximately 160 meters (520 ft) in diameter compared to 780 meters (2,560 ft) for its primary (a mean diameter-ratio of 0.22). It was previously known by its provisional designation S/2003 (65803) 1 and had been informally called "Didymoon" or "Didymos B".

== Naming ==
This minor planet was named "Didymos", Greek for "twin", due to its binary nature. The name was suggested by the discoverer, University of Arizona Lunar and Planetary Laboratory astronomer Joseph L. "Joe" Montani, who made the naming proposal to the International Astronomical Union after the binary nature of the object was detected. The approved naming citation was published on 13 July 2004 (M.P.C. 52326).

The proper name for the satellite Didymos B comes from the word "Dimorphos", Greek for "having two forms". The meaning of the name represents how the form of Dimorphos's orbit will change after the collision with NASA's Double Asteroid Redirection Test (DART) spacecraft, though in fact the change will be only a very slight change in its orbital parameters. Appropriately, Dimorphos serves dual roles as both a test target and as a part of a blueprint for a modality for future planetary protection. The name of the moon was suggested by planetary scientist Kleomenis Tsiganis at the Aristotle University of Thessaloniki, Greece.

Two boulders (saxa) have been given names of traditional drums.

Named features
Name	Pronunciation	Feature	Named after	Date approved
Carillon Saxum	US: /ˈkærəlɒn/ UK: /kəˈrɪljən/	boulder	carillon	14 Nov 2023
Gong Saxum	/ˈɡɒŋ/	boulder	gong	14 Nov 2023

== Exploration ==
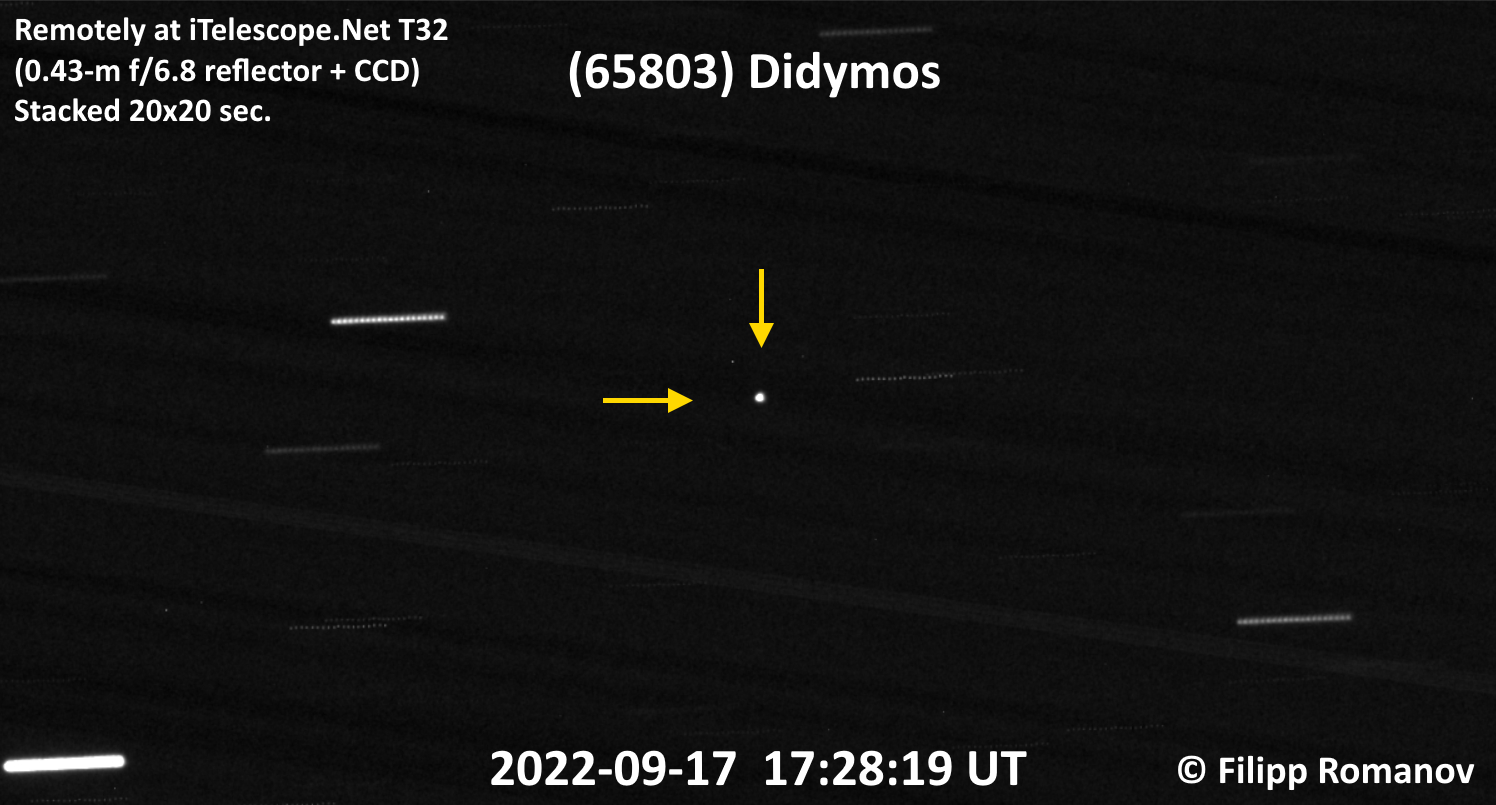
Telescope image of Didymos before DART's impact

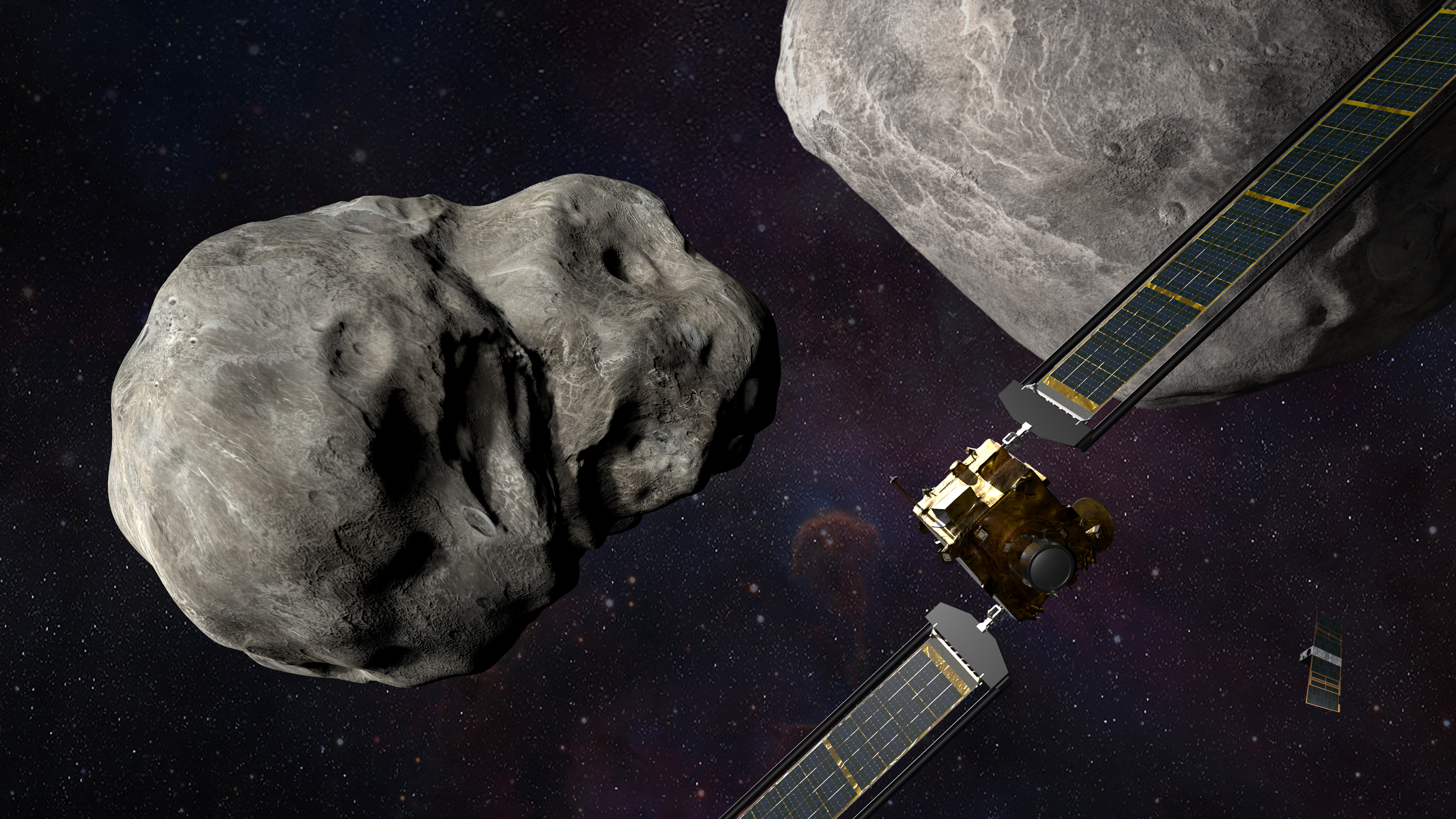
Artist's impression of the DART spacecraft

Animation of DART's trajectory
DART · 65803 Didymos · Earth · Sun · 2001 CB_{21} · 3361 Orpheus

Animation of DART around Didymos - Impact on Dimorphos
DART · Didymos · Dimorphos

Timelapse of the Didymos system's expanding dust plume from the DART impact, as seen by the South African Astronomical Observatory's 1-meter Lesedi telescope

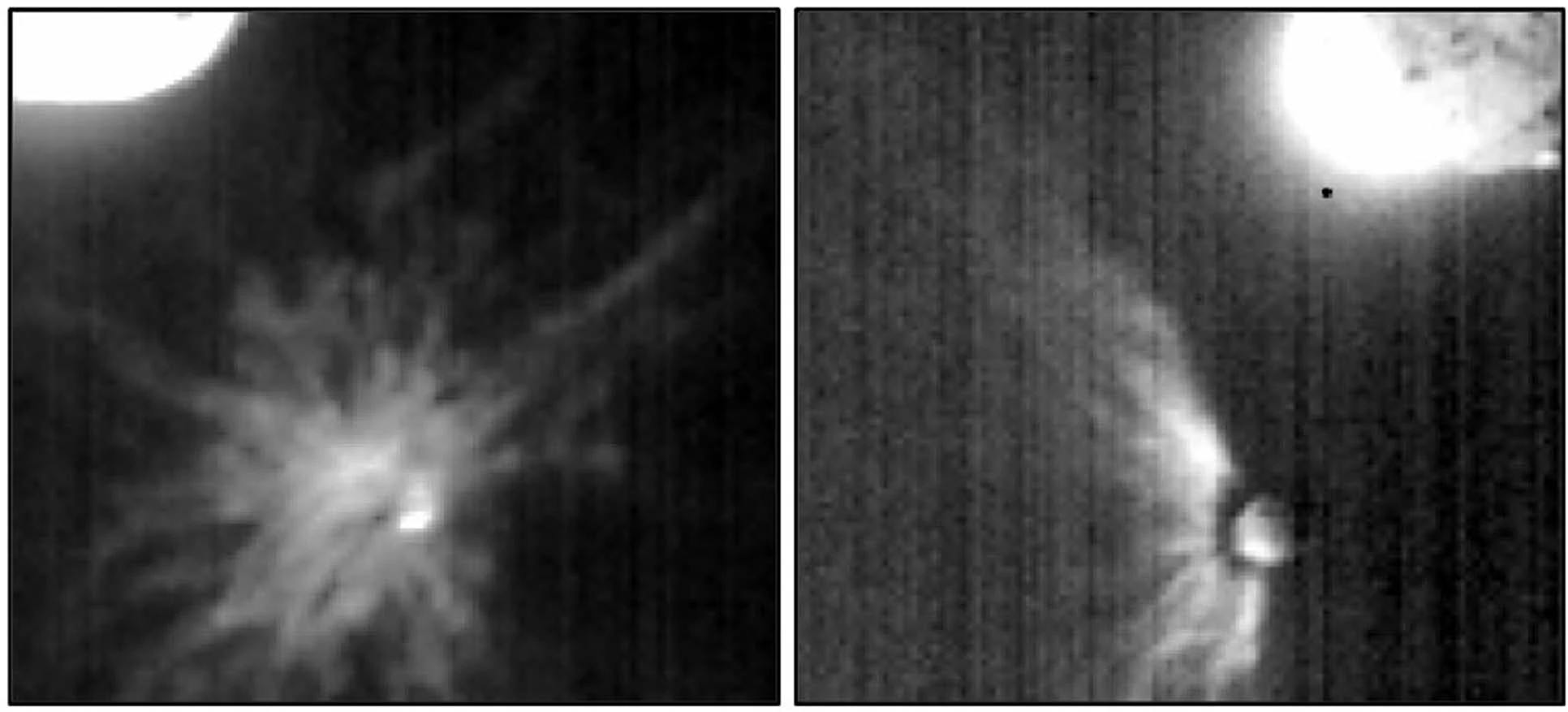
Dart impact seen by LICIACube

Didymos and Dimorphos as imaged by Hera in November 2026

In the early 2010s, Didymos's moon, Dimorphos was to be the principal target of proposed robotic mission by the ESA and NASA, called the Asteroid Impact & Deflection Assessment (AIDA) mission. The ESA dropped out, and the mission did not proceed.

NASA redefined mission requirements and decided to proceed with a 2020s mission to visit Didymos with an impactor, which had been considered as a part of the earlier AIDA mission, named the Double Asteroid Redirection Test or DART. The NASA mission was intended to test whether a spacecraft impact could successfully deflect an asteroid on a collision course with Earth. The DART spacecraft was launched on 24 November 2021, and impacted Dimorphos on September 26, 2022. It was accompanied by the Italian Space Agency's (ASI) six-unit LICIACube flyby Cubesat that was released 15 days before impact to observe the asteroid and DART's impact.

DART was the first spacecraft to intentionally target an asteroid known to have a minor-planet moon. (Note: Galileo discovered the moon of 243 Ida during its flyby, New Horizons launched toward Pluto before its demotion from planet status, and Lucy's first target 3548 Eurybates was only found to have a moon shortly before the probe's launch.) Didymos is the most easily reachable asteroid of its size from Earth, requiring a delta-v of only 5.1 km/s for a spacecraft to rendezvous, compared to 6.0 km/s to reach the Moon.

After two weeks of analysis, NASA announced that the collision shortened Dimorphos's orbital period around Didymos by 32 minutes, far more than the minimum requirement of 73 seconds and the success benchmark of 10 minutes. The measurement has an uncertainty of ±2 minutes.

ESA's Hera mission is planning to survey the dynamical effects of the DART impact and measure the characteristics of the crater made by DART. Approved in November 2019 and launched in October 2024, Hera arrived at Didymos in November 2026.

== See also ==
- 66391 Moshup – a similar near-Earth asteroid binary system
- List of asteroids visited by spacecraft
