= Hera (space mission) =

Planetary defence spacecraft developed by the ESA

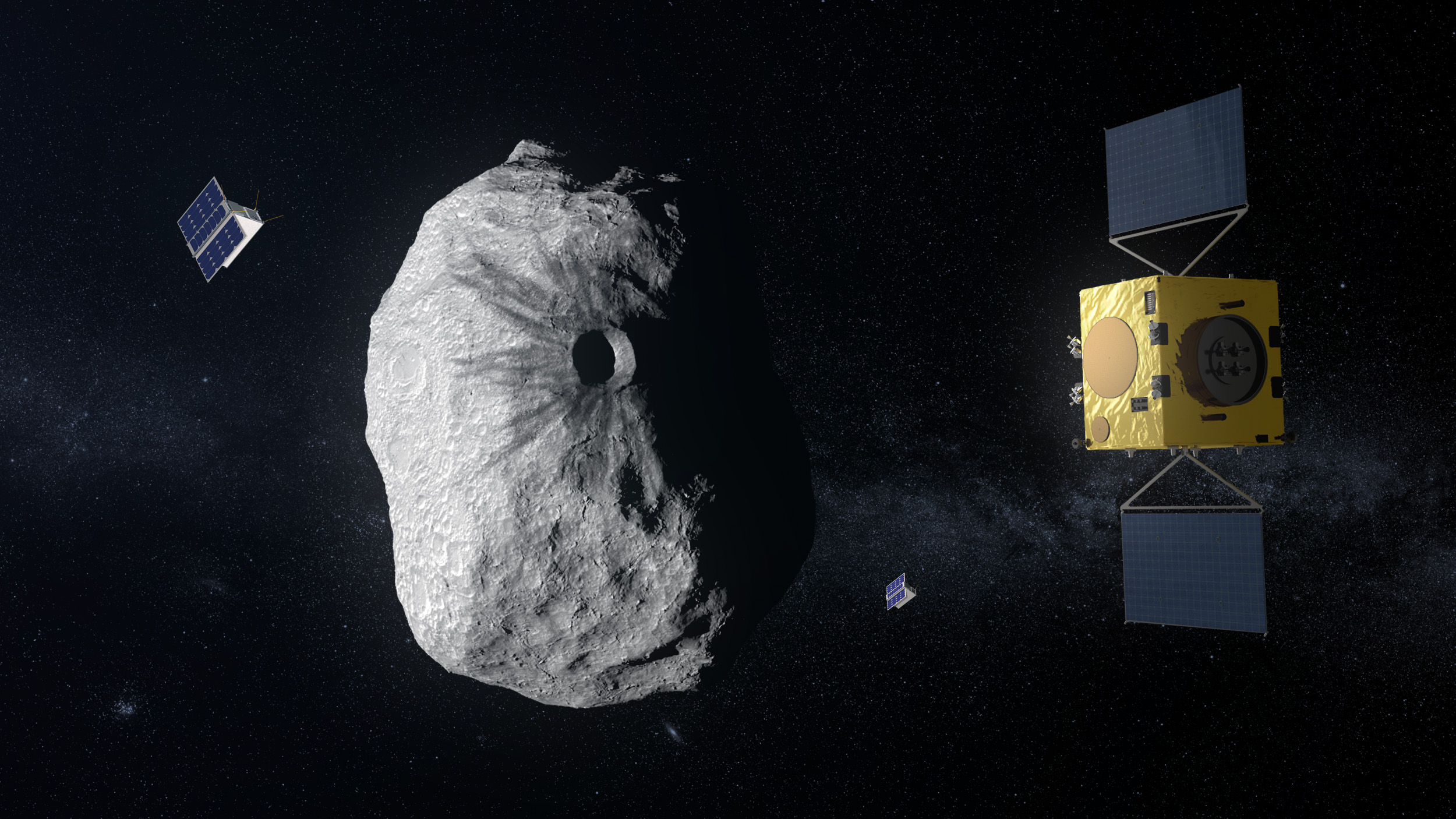
- Artist's impression of Hera in orbit around Dimorphos
- Mission type: Didymos orbiter
- Operator: European Space Agency
- COSPAR ID: 2024-180A
- SATCAT no.: 61449
- Website: heramission.space
- Mission duration: 2 years, 1 month, 13 days (elapsed); 2 years, 9 months (planned) (Note: 2 year, 3 month cruise phase, followed by a 6 month science phase)

Spacecraft properties
- Manufacturer: OHB SE
- Launch mass: 1,128 kg (2,487 lb)
- Dry mass: 350 kg (770 lb)
- Dimensions: 1.6 × 1.6 × 1.7 m (5.2 × 5.2 × 5.6 ft)

Start of mission
- Launch date: 7 October 2024, 14:52:11 UTC (10:52:11 am EDT)
- Rocket: Falcon 9 Block 5 B1061-23
- Launch site: Cape Canaveral, SLC‑40
- Contractor: SpaceX

Flyby of Deimos
- Closest approach: 12 March 2025, 12:07 GMT
- Distance: 300 km (190 mi)

Flyby of Mars
- Closest approach: 12 March 2025, 12:51 GMT
- Distance: 5,000 km (3,100 mi)

65803 Didymos orbiter
- Orbital insertion: November 2026
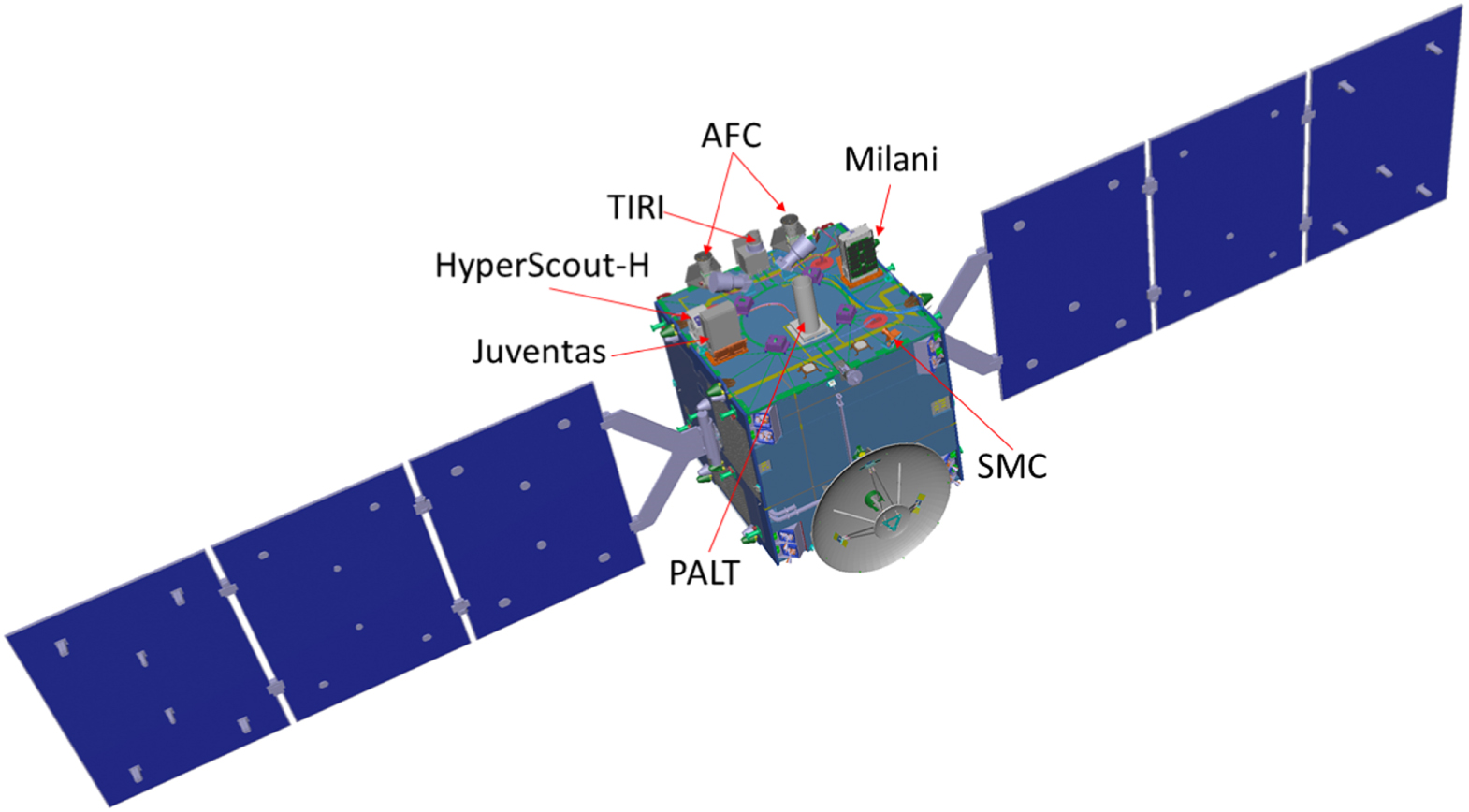
Instruments
- AFC: Asteroid Framing Camera
- TIRI: Thermal Infra Red Imager
- PALT: Planetary Altimeter
- RSE: Radio Science Experiment
- HS: HyperScout-H
- ESA insignia Space Safety Programme

Hera is the first planetary defence spacecraft developed by the European Space Agency (ESA). Its primary mission objective is to study the Didymos binary asteroid system that was impacted in 2022 by NASA's DART spacecraft, contributing to validation of the kinetic impact method to deviate a near-Earth asteroid from a colliding trajectory with Earth. Hera has a mass of 1,128 kg (2,487 lb) and carries a payload of cameras, an altimeter, and a spectrometer. It is carrying two small CubeSat spacecraft, called Milani and Juventas. The spacecraft was launched in October 2024 by Falcon 9 and arrived at the double asteroid in November 2026. Hera is the first mission of ESA's Space Safety Programme.

== Mission goals ==
Hera will measure the size and morphology of the crater created as well as the momentum transferred by an artificial projectile impacting an asteroid, which will allow measuring the efficiency of the deflection produced by the impact. It will also analyze the expanding debris cloud caused by the impact. Hera is intended to fully characterize the composition and physical properties of the binary asteroid system including, for the first time, the sub-surface and internal structures. It will also perform technological demonstrations linked to operations in the vicinity of a small Solar System body and the deployment of and communication with CubeSats in interplanetary space.

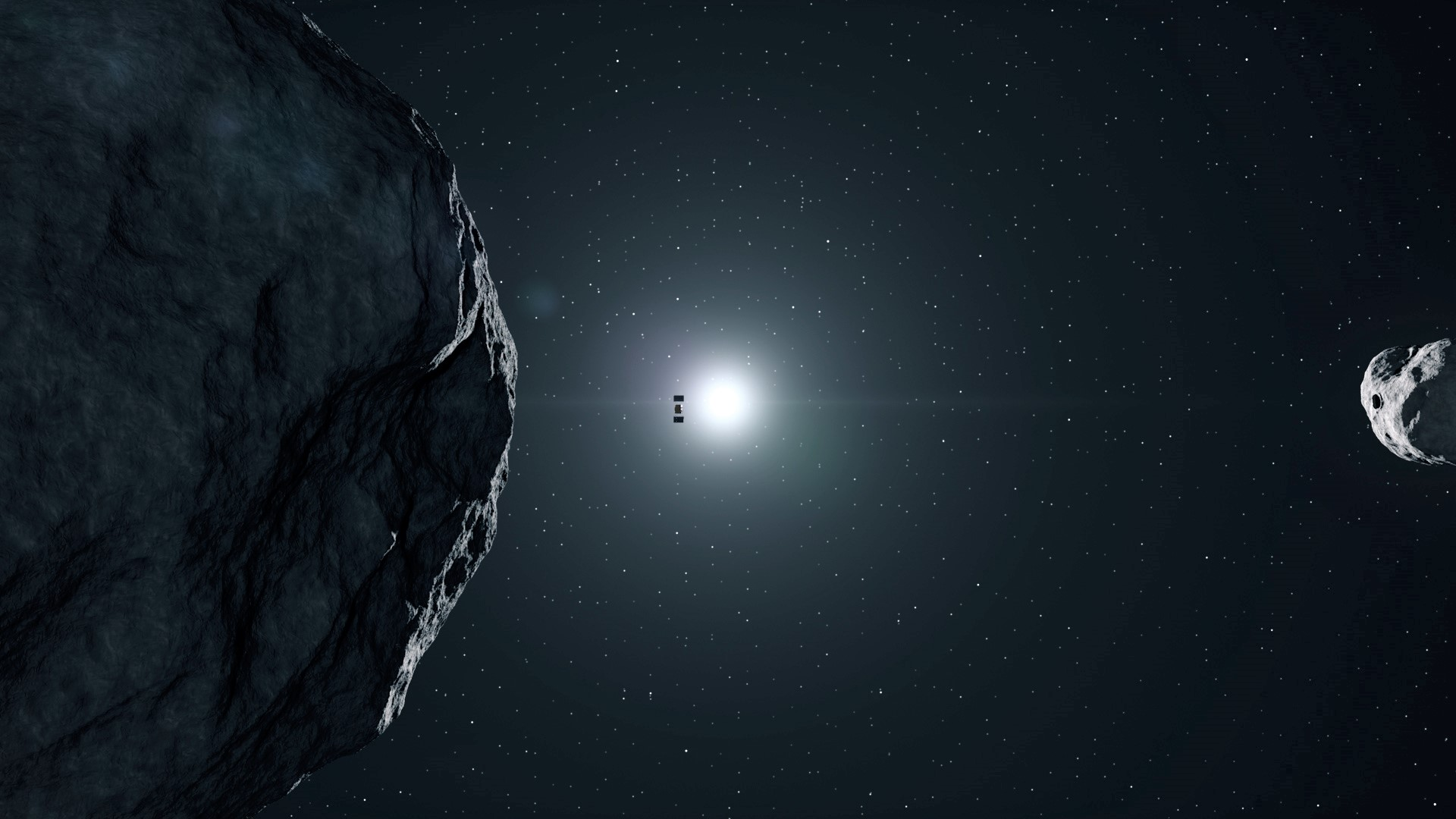
Illustration of Hera performing close proximity operations at Didymos

=== Planetary defense ===
The main objective of the Hera mission is to evaluate the kinetic impactor method for deflecting a near-Earth object. This planetary defense method consists of modifying the trajectory of the asteroid by launching a spacecraft at a speed of a few kilometers per second. To fulfill this objective, Hera will determine:

- how much momentum transfer depends on the density, porosity and characteristics of the asteroid's surface and internal structure and
- what proportion of the kinetic energy is transferred in the fragmentation and restructuring of the asteroid or in the kinetic energy of the ejected materials.

=== Science ===
Scientific objectives of the mission include exploring the properties of the two target asteroids: surface characteristics, internal porosity, and internal structure. The entire moon Dimorphos will be mapped with a spatial resolution of a few meters and the vicinity of the impact with a resolution of 10 centimeters. The mass of the moon will be estimated with high accuracy, allowing a direct estimate of the momentum transfer efficiency from DART impact.

=== Technology ===
The mission's technological objectives include the production and testing of guidance software which, by using data from several sensors, will make it possible to reconstruct the surrounding space and thus to independently define a safe trajectory around the asteroid.

Hera also carries two CubeSats which will be dropped once the asteroid is reached:

- Juventas will carry out subsurface and internal structure measurements, contribute to the determination of the gravity field, and provide information on the mechanical response of the surface when landing on Dimorphos
- Milani will collect spectral data from the surface of the two asteroids to study their surface composition and identify the presence of dust in the surrounding space

=== Software laboratory ===
After Hera completes its primary mission in mid-2027, it will be used as a flying software laboratory for testing innovative autonomy-focused approaches. One core of the onboard computer's dual-core LEON3 processor will operate the spacecraft while the other will be used as a software sandbox.

== Spacecraft ==
Hera spacecraft size comparison: The binary asteroid Didymos in solar orbit extends out beyond Mars. The primary mountain-sized body has a diameter of around 780 m and a rotation period of 2.26 hours. Dimorphos, the secondary body, has a diameter of around 151 m and orbits the primary at a distance of around 1.1 km from the primary surface in around 11 hours and 22 minutes (reduced by 33 minutes after DART's impact).

The main bus of Hera has a box-shape based on a central tube and adapter cone of 1.6 × 1.6 × 1.7 meters. Two solar panel wings extend from opposite sides, and a high-gain dish antenna is mounted on one face. Total launch mass of the spacecraft is approximately 1214 kg, the dry mass is 696 kg. Spacecraft deployed dimensions are 2.2 × 11.4 × 2.2 meters. The solar panels have an area of about 13 square meters. The spacecraft will use 712 W at the nominal 2.4 AU distance. Bi-propellant chemical propulsion is used for 16 reaction control thrusters and 6 orbit control thrusters, all 10-N motors. Total available delta-V is about 1300 m/s. Communications with the ground are X-band (~8.4 GHz), with two low gain antennas in addition to the high-gain dish. S-band communications (~2.2 GHz), using patch antennas, will be used to communicate with the two CubeSats named Juventas and Milani, with a range of 60 km. Spacecraft orientation is maintained by 4 reaction wheels, gyroscopes, using star trackers and solar sensors, as well two Asteroid Framing Cameras (AFC). Attitude guidance is through the Planetary Altimeter (PALT).

== Scientific instruments ==
=== Asteroid framing cameras (AFC) ===
The main instruments of Hera are the two AFC cameras (Asteroid Framing Cameras), developed by the company JenaOptronik. Identical and redundant, they each have a FaintStar panchromatic sensor of 1020 × 1020 pixels with a telephoto lens. The field of view is 5.5 × 5.5 degrees, and the spatial resolution reaches one meter at a distance of 10 kilometers. These cameras are designed to provide physical characteristics of the surface of the asteroid Didymos and Dimorphos as well as the crater created by DART and the Juventas landing zone.

=== Hyperspectral imager – HyperScout-H ===
HyperScout-H is a hyperspectral imager that must provide images in a spectral range between 650 and 950 nm (visible and near infrared). The instrument makes its observations in 25 distinct spectral bands. It is developed by cosine Remote Sensing. This is a specific version developed for Hera, different from the standard HyperScout.

=== Planetary altimeter (PALT) ===
PALT is a micro-Lidar planetary altimeter using a laser emitting an infrared light beam at 1.5 microns. Its track on the ground is 1 meter at an altitude of 1 kilometer (1 milliradian). The altitude measurement accuracy is 0.5 meters. Its frequency is 10 Hertz.

=== Thermal Infrared Imager (TIRI) ===
TIRI is a thermal infrared imager provided by the JAXA, the Japanese space agency. The spectral range observed is between 8 and 14 microns and it has 8 filters. Its visual range is 13.0 × 9.9°. The spatial resolution is 0.013° per pixel.

=== X-Band Radio Science (X-DST) ===
The mass of the two asteroids making up the binary system, the characteristics of their gravity field, their rotational speed, and their orbits will be measured using radio wave disturbances caused by the Doppler effect. The measurements relate to the radio exchanges between Hera and Earth stations but also between Hera and the CubeSats. Due to the low orbit in which the CubeSats will circulate, these last measurements are crucial to determine the gravity of Didymos.

Main characteristics of the instruments
	AFC	HyperScout-H	PALT	TIRI
Type	Visible Imager	Spectral imager	Altimeter	Thermal infrared imager
Mass (kg)	<1.5	5.5	4.5	<4.4
Visual range (degrees)	5.5	15.5 × 8.3	non-applicable	13.3 × 10
Spatial resolution (microradians)	94.1	133	1000	226
Spectral band (nanometers)	350–1000	665–975		700–1400
Others		25 spectral bands	vertical precision : 0.5 m.	6 filters
Power (Watts)	<1.3	2.5 (average) – 4.5 (peak)	<14.5	20 (average) – <30

== CubeSats ==
Two CubeSat type nanosatellites, named Milani and Juventas, are transported by Hera and released before arrival in the asteroidal system (65803) Didymos. They are responsible for carrying out investigations that complement those of their carrier ship. Both CubeSats are built around a similar platform. These are 6U-XL CubeSats with a mass (including propellant) of approximately 12 kilograms. They are 3-axis stabilized and have a cold gas propulsion system. They communicate with the mothership in S-band. The Doppler effect affected radio link is used to measure the characteristics of the gravitational field of the binary system. They have a visible light camera and star trackers which are used to determine the dynamic variations of Didymos. Finally, the two CubeSats are equipped with accelerometers which will be used to determine the properties of the surface of Dimorphos if the CubeSats land on its surface as planned at the end of their mission. Juventas was developed by GomSpace and Milani by Tyvak International.

=== Juventas ===
The CubeSat Juventas aims to determine the geophysical characteristics of Dimorphos. The probe will map its gravity field and determine its internal structure as well as the characteristics of its surface. To fulfill these objectives, it carries the following instruments:

- The JuRa radar operating in the 50–70 MHz frequency with a spatial resolution of 10 to 15 meters. It is the first instrument to probe the inner layers of an asteroid. It uses two dipole antennas with each branch measuring 1.5 meters. Each measurement session can last up to 45 minutes. It occupies a volume of less than 1U and its mass is less than 1300 grams.
- The GRASS gravimeter whose dynamic range is 5 × 10^{−4} and sensitivity is 5 × 10^{−7}. Its mass is less than 380 grams.
- A camera.
- The radio link with the mother ship (measurement of the Doppler effect).

=== Milani ===
The CubeSat Milani (named after Andrea Milani) aims to take images and measure the characteristics of the possibly present dust. It will map the two asteroids forming the binary asteroid 65803 Didymos, characterize their surface, evaluate the effects of the DART impact, contribute to the measurements of the gravitational field of the asteroids, and determine the characteristics of the dust clouds possibly located around the asteroids. To fulfill these objectives, it carries two instruments:

- The ASPECT hyperspectral imaging spectrometer is the main instrument. It works in visible and near infrared light (0.65 to 2.50 microns). Its spatial resolution is 2 meters at 10 kilometers and its spectral resolution is less than 40 nanometers.
- The VISTA thermogravimeter is responsible for detecting dust (5 to 10 microns), volatiles (such as water) and light organic materials.

== History ==
=== AIDA, the joint project with NASA ===
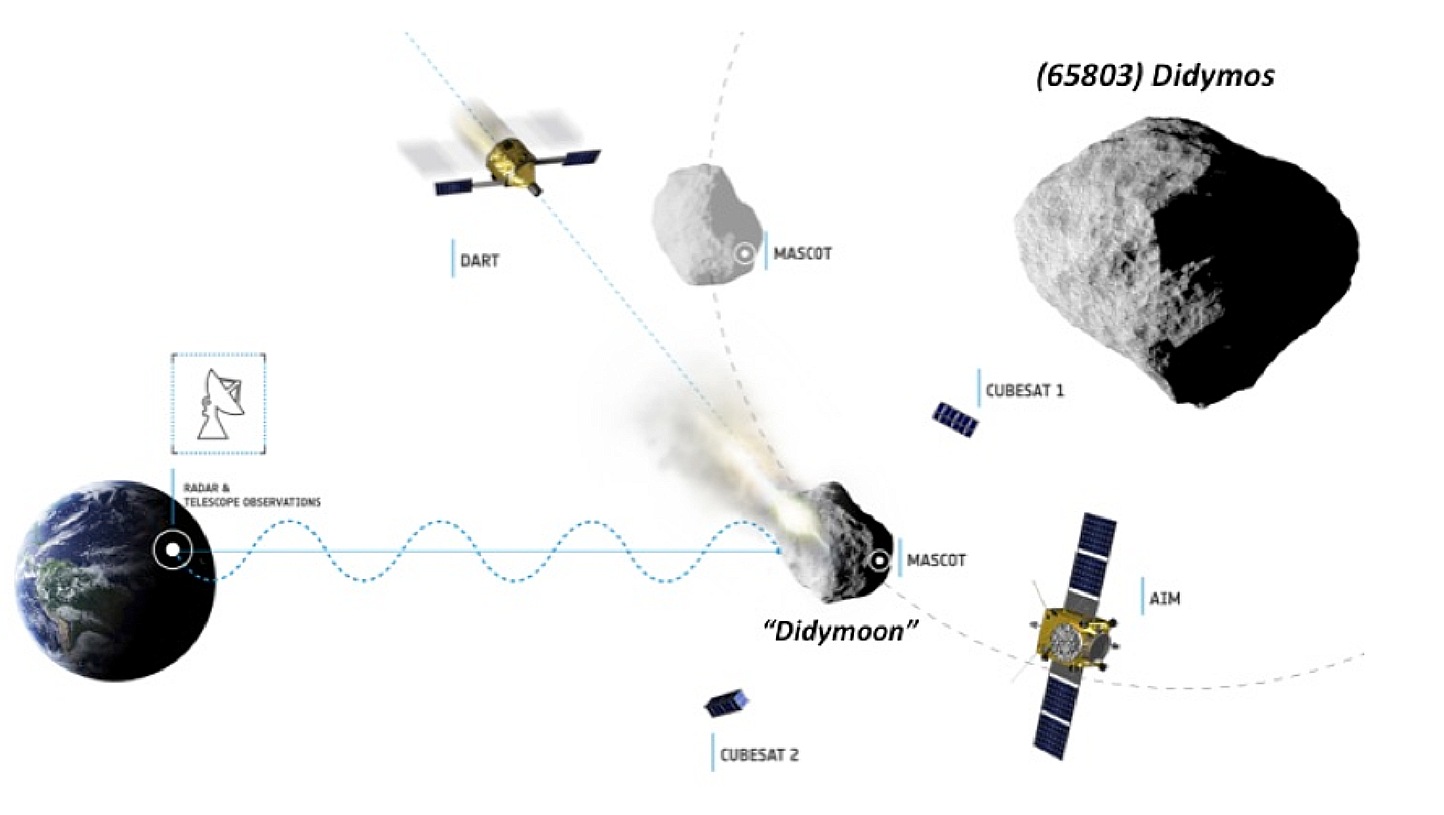
AIDA mission concept from 2015

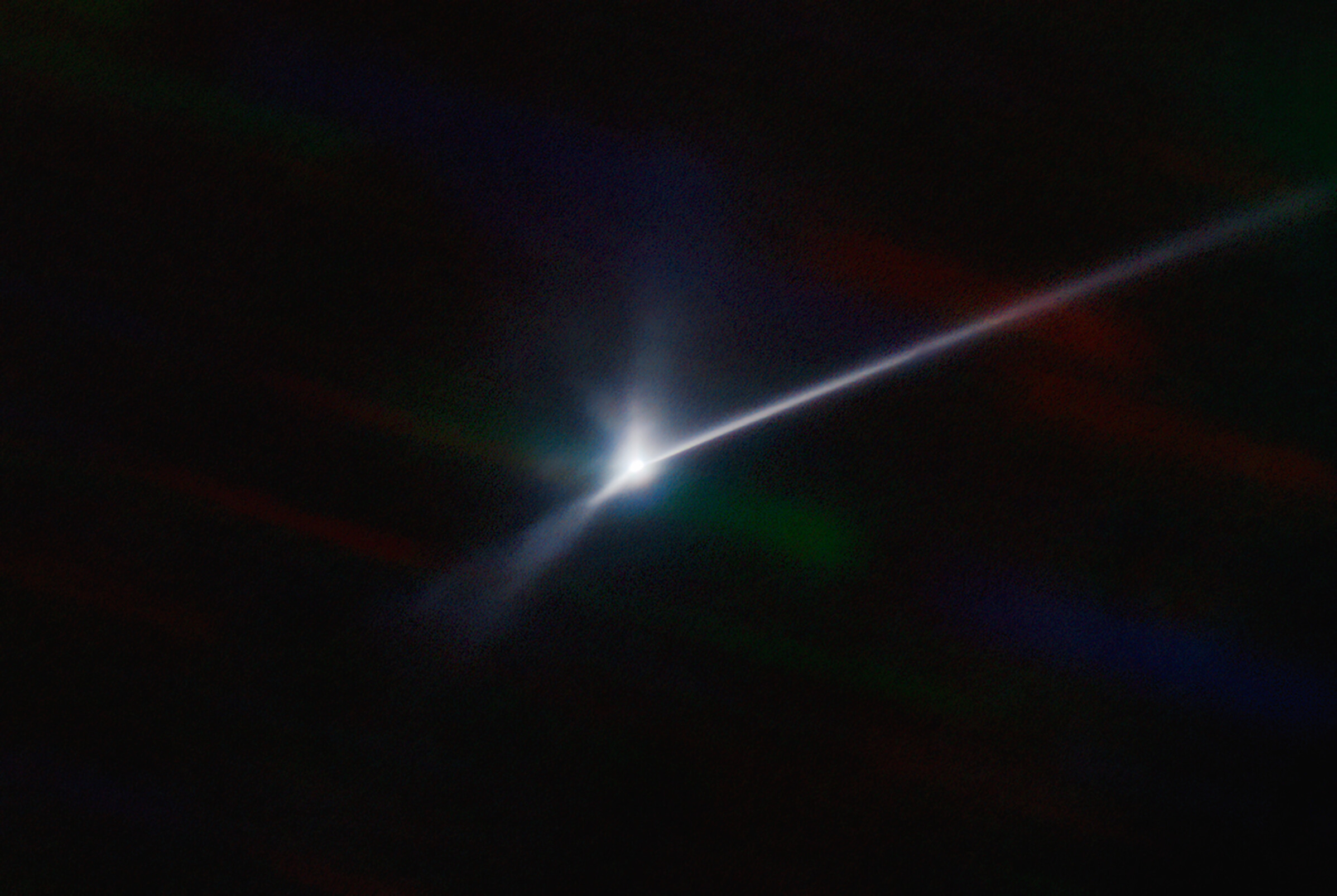
SOAR telescope shows the vast plume of dust and debris blasted from the surface of Dimorphos

AIDA was the first operational program whose objective is to test a method of deflecting near-Earth asteroids. It was set up in 2013 jointly by scientists supported by NASA and ESA. Its objective was to test the use of an impactor-type device to deflect an asteroid that might strike the Earth. This program provided for the launch to the binary asteroid 65803 Didymos of two spacecraft: the DART impactor developed by NASA responsible for crashing at high speed on the smaller of the two asteroids and the AIM orbiter developed by ESA, which would measure the effects of the impact.

After an evaluation phase in the two space agencies, ESA decided at the end of 2016 to abandon the development of AIM due to lack of sufficient financial support from member states. NASA, for its part, decided to continue the development of DART. In this new context, terrestrial observatories were responsible for taking over partially the role of AIM.

The DART mission was launched on 24 November 2021 by a Falcon 9 rocket from Vandenberg Space Force Base and reached the binary asteroid 65803 Didymos on 26 September 2022, colliding with its satellite Dimorphos at 23:16 UTC at a relative speed of about 6.6 km/s. The project incorporated the Italian nano-satellite LICIACube, responsible for documenting and retransmitting the first 100 seconds of the impact.

=== Renaissance of the European project ===
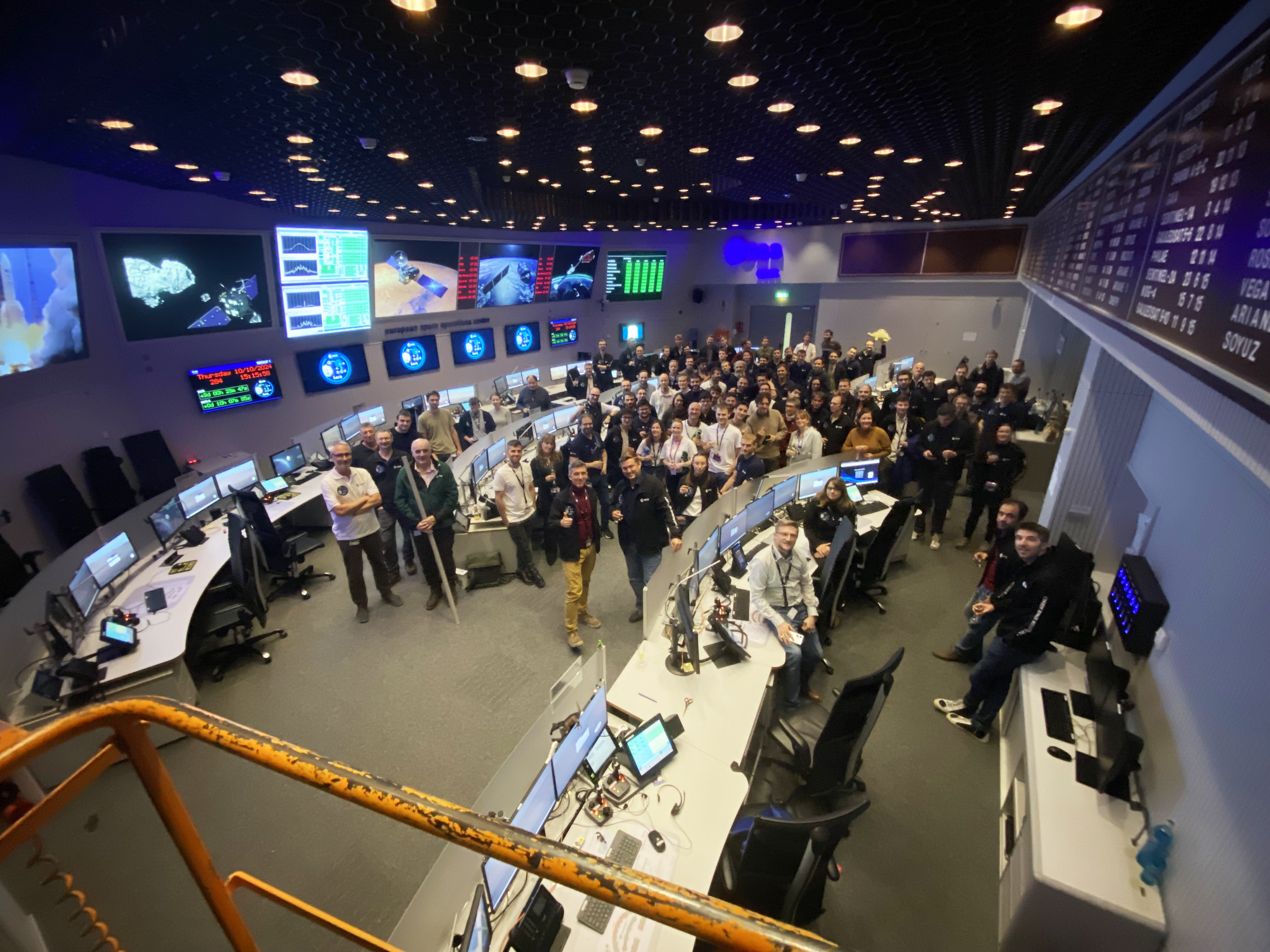
ESA-ESOC Main Control Room with the Hera team assembling

In 2017, at the request of several member states of ESA, the agency resumed studies of a replacement for AIM, specifically a mission that was named Hera (after the Greek goddess). Hera is intended to fulfill all the objectives assigned to AIM that Earth-based observatories could not, using the components of AIM as much as possible.

The Hera mission was subsequently approved by the ESA Ministerial Council in November 2019. In September 2020, ESA awarded the construction of the spacecraft to a consortium of companies led by OHB, under a contract of 129.4 million euros. It also formalized the scientific team of the mission, made up of a principal investigator, scientific council, and four working groups covering all aspects of the mission and the scientific managers of the instruments.

=== Construction and testing ===
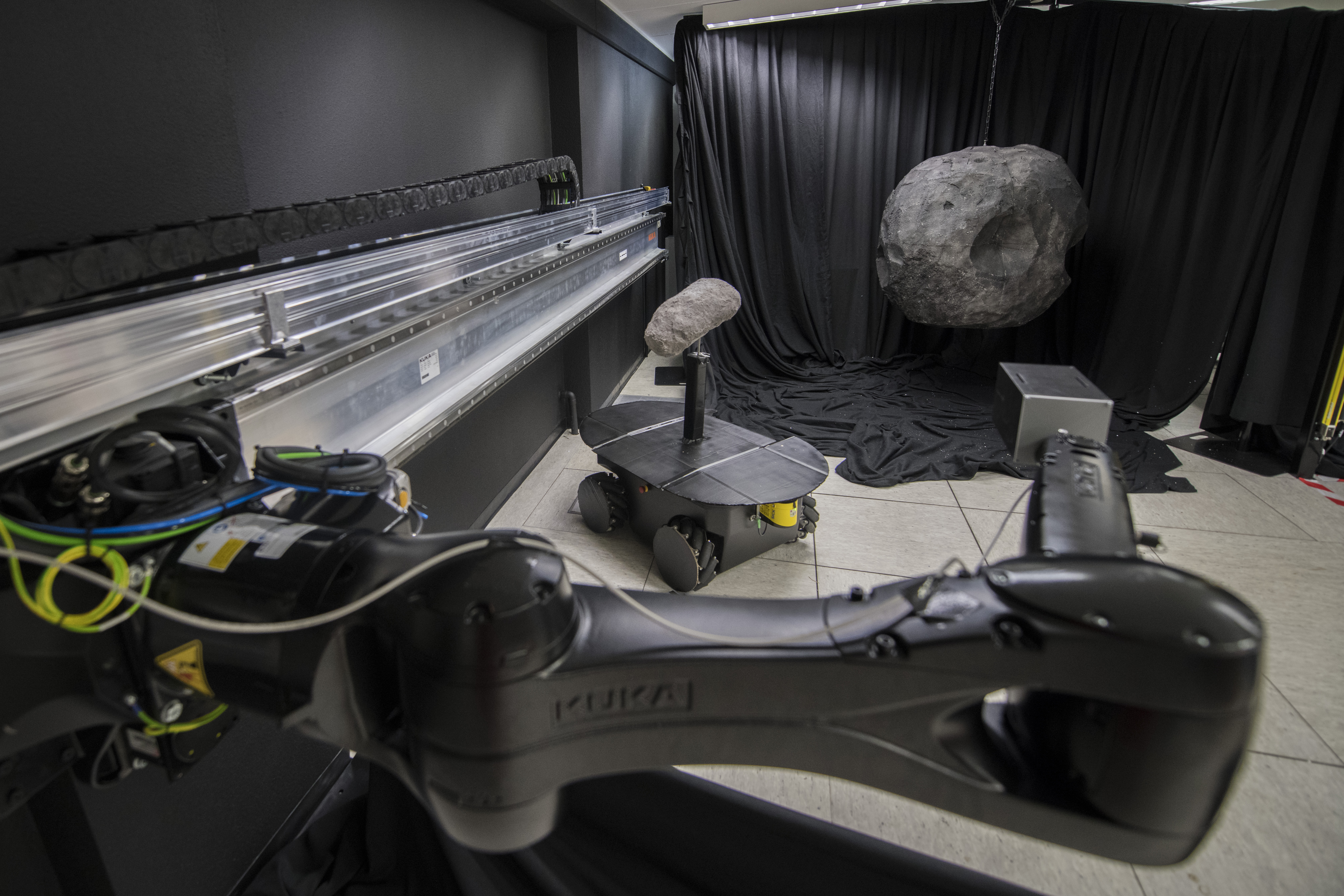
Testing of Hera's vision-based navigation software with 3D printed asteroid models

Hera's Core Module and Propulsion Module were connected at OHB Bremen in Germany in August 2023. In November 2023, the spacecraft completed acoustic testing at ESTEC in the Netherlands. The Milani CubeSat, integrated in Italy, and the Juventas CubeSat, integrated in Denmark, were delivered to ESTEC for integration with Hera in March 2024. The spacecraft moved to final testing in March 2024. In September 2024, Hera was transported to Florida by Antonov Airlines's AN-124 cargo aircraft.

=== Launch ===
Animation of Hera around Sun Hera · Sun · 65803 Didymos · Mars · Earth

Hera was launched on 7 October 2024 at 14:52 UTC by a Falcon 9 rocket lifting off from Space Launch Complex 40 (SLC-40) at Cape Canaveral Space Force Station. Usually, Falcon 9 launches for beyond geostationary transfer orbit were made from the nearby Launch Complex 39A (LC-39A) at Kennedy Space Center due to SLC-40's focus on Starlink launches. However, LC-39A was in the midst of preparing for the launch of NASA's Europa Clipper on a Falcon Heavy later in the week, which locked Hera into using SLC-40. Additionally, the launch occurred while Falcon 9 was grounded due to a mishap during a second stage deorbit burn that happened on the SpaceX Crew-9 mission the previous month. As Hera was to be put into a heliocentric orbit however, the Federal Aviation Administration waived the grounding for its launch as an exception. The booster used for the launch was expended to help with the trajectory; it previously flew 22 times, including on missions like SpaceX Crew-1 and the IXPE.

=== Cruise towards Mars ===
On 10 and 11 October 2024, Hera tested three of its science instruments (AFC, TIRI, and HyperScout H) by using them to take pictures of Earth and the Moon from a distance of more than one million km. In October 2024, the two CubeSats aboard Hera were briefly activated to confirm their nominal status and test their ability to communicate with Earth. This marked the first operation of CubeSats in deep space by ESA. Following three successful test burns performed after launch, the spacecraft conducted its first deep-space maneuver on 27 October 2024, firing its three orbital control thrusters for 100 minutes and changing its velocity by ~146 m/s, and second on 6 November 2024, firing for 13 minutes and changing its velocity by ~20 m/s.

=== Mars flyby ===
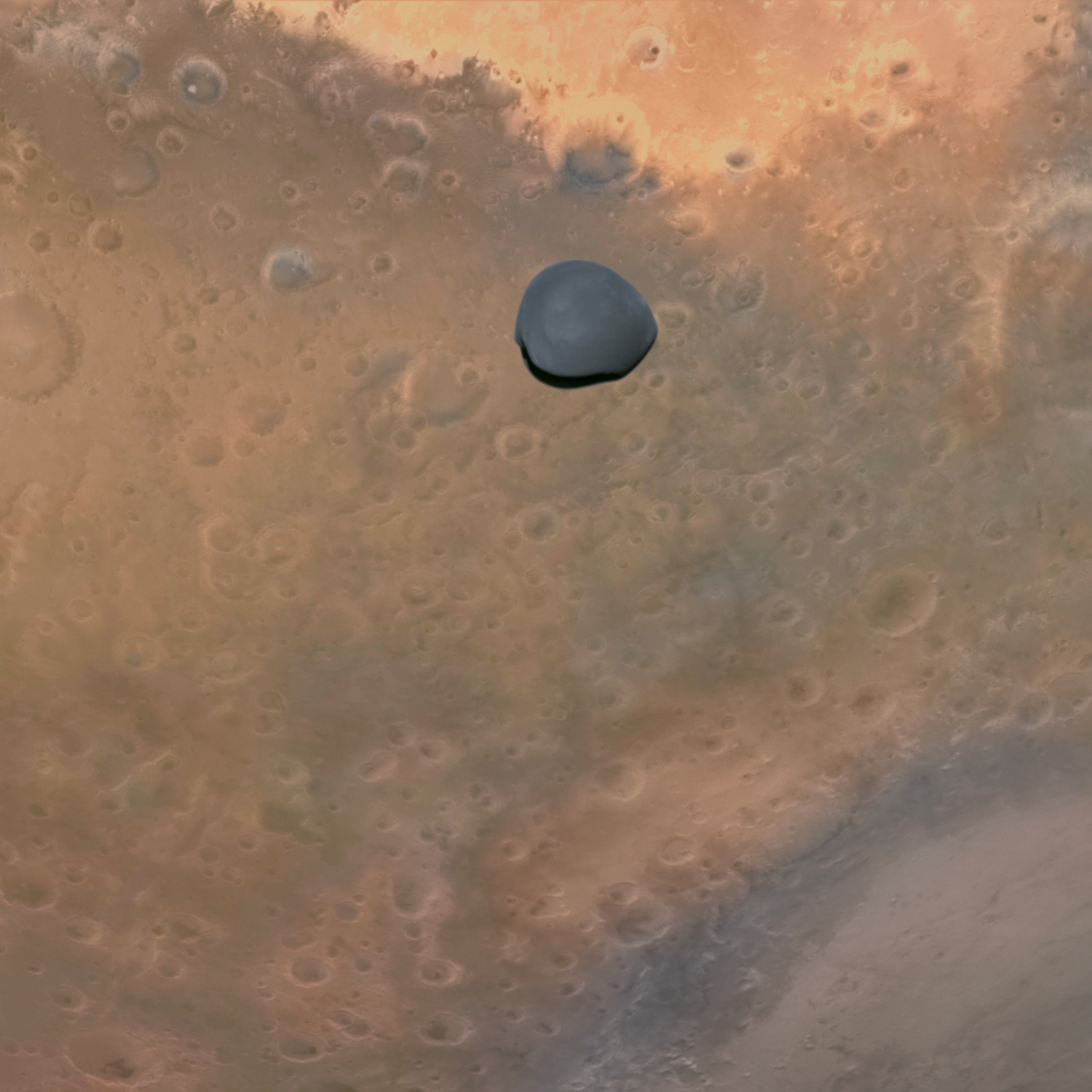
Deimos over Terra Sabaea, photo taken by Hera on 12 March 2025, colorised and processed by Andrea Luck

Hera performed a gravity assist at Mars on 12 March 2025, coming at a distance of 5,000 km (3,100 mi) from the surface. As part of the flyby, the spacecraft spent some time observing the Martian moon Deimos, imaging it from distance of 1,000 km (620 mi) and having its closest approach at 300 km (190 mi) away. During the flyby, Hera also autonomously locked onto impact craters and other surface features on Mars to track them over time, in a full-scale test of the autonomous navigation techniques it will use to navigate around its targets.

Hera's observations of Deimos revealed previously unobserved outlines of ancient craters buried beneath a dust layer. These data were used in a study, published in Nature Astronomy in 2026, that simulated various scenarios of the moon's past and composition. The researches concluded that Deimos is most likely a rubble pile body which has been dramatically reshaped by a slanting impact of a 320-m-wide asteroid, resulting in a 10 km basin around the moon's south pole and a thick layer of dust on its surface.

=== Cruise through the main asteroid belt ===
On 11 May 2025, the mission captured images of the asteroid (1126) Otero from a distance of approximately 3 million km and on 19 July 2025 of the asteroid (18805) Kellyday from a distance of approximately 6 million km in order to perform instrument tests and to demonstrate agile spacecraft operations useful for planetary defence. In October 2025, ESA announced that Hera was on track to arrive at Didymos in November 2026—a month earlier than originally planned. Between 25 October and 1 November 2025, Hera was passing through the cometary tail of the third known interstellar object, the comet 3I/ATLAS. The spacecraft flew 8.2 million km from the tail's central axis.

In March 2026, Hera successfully performed its second deep-space maneuver, burning 123 kg of hydrazine and changing its velocity by 367 m/s. This was the mission's largest maneuver in terms of fuel consumption. Over two weeks in June and July 2026, ESA upgraded Hera's software, making the spacecraft ready for its asteroid phase.

=== Arrival ===
Didymos and Dimorphos as imaged by Hera in November 2026

On 2 October 2026, Hera performed a brief test burn in preparation for the initial braking manoeuvre (BRM-1) planned for 15 October 2026. Exactly two years after Hera launched, the spacecraft imaged its binary asteroid destination (65803) Didymos on 7 October 2026 for the first time as a single pixel from 236,500 km away. On 15 October 2026, Hera performed the 93-minute initial braking manoeuvre BRM-1. Later in October 2026, the spacecraft performed a second braking manoeuvre at a distance of 2,300 km from Didymos. It reduced Hera's velocity relative to the target system by 70 m/s.

On 18 October 2026, at a distance of 1,280 km, Hera took its first image resolving the target asteroid pair as two objects. On 5 November 2026, ESA published the first detailed image of Didymos taken by Hera from 60 km away and announced that the first detailed images of Dimorphos would be revealed on 25 November 2026. Hera arrived at the double asteroid system four years after the DART impact, marking the first low-velocity spacecraft rendezvous with a binary asteroid.

=== At the asteroids ===
Thermal infrared image of Didymos and Dimorphos by TIRI

On 11 November 2026, Hera entered a "rectangular orbit" around the asteroids, commencing the early characterization phase. This type of trajectory, derived from the experience with Rosetta, is not an actual orbit, but rather a series of nearly straight lines at the velocity of 12 cm/s interrupted by thruster firings shifting the trajectory by 90 degrees. This way, Hera maintained a 30–25 km distance from the asteroids while eliminating the risk of collision in case of thruster malfunction. On 17 November 2026, ESA released images of Didymos taken from 28.5 km away by three of Hera's instruments: a monochrome image with a spatial resolution of cca 2.7 m per pixel taken by AFC, a thermal image by TIRI, and a series of hyperspectral images by HyperScout-H.

Mission phases
Phase	Mission phase	Duration	Mission
1	Early Characterization	6 weeks (11 November 2026–December 2026)	The global shape and mass/gravity, as well as thermal and dynamical properties, of both asteroids will be determined
2	Payload Deployment	2 weeks	The release of the two CubeSats
3	Detailed Characterization	4 weeks	Meter-scale mapping of the asteroids and determination of thermal, spectral, and interior properties
4	Close Observation	6 weeks	High-resolution investigations of a large fraction of the surface area of Dimorphos, including the DART impact crater
5	Experimental	6 weeks	Morphological, spectral, and thermal properties of Dimorphos

== See also ==
- Near-Earth Object Coordination Centre (ESA's NEOCC)
- Planetary Defense Coordination Office (NASA's PDCO)
- Double Asteroid Redirection Test (DART mission)
- List of European Space Agency programmes and missions

== Bibliography ==
- Michel, Patrick; Cheng, A.; Küppers, M.; Pravec, P.; Blum, J.; Delbo, M.; Green, S.F.; Rosenblatt, P.; Tsiganis, K.; Vincent, J.B.; Biele, J.; Ciarletti, V.; Hérique, A.; Ulamec, S.; Carnelli, I.; Galvez, A.; Benner, L.; Naidu, S.P.; Barnouin, O.S.; Richardson, D.C.; Rivkin, A.; Scheirich, P.; Moskovitz, N.; Thirouin, A.; Schwartz, S.R.; Campo Bagatin, A.; Yu, Y. (June 2016). "Science case for the Asteroid Impact Mission (AIM): A component of the Asteroid Impact & Deflection Assessment (AIDA) mission" (PDF). Advances in Space Research. 57 (12): 2529–2547. Bibcode:2016AdSpR..57.2529M. doi:10.1016/j.asr.2016.03.031. S2CID 42465954.
- Michel, Patrick; Kueppers, Michael; Sierks, Holger; Carnelli, Ian; Cheng, Andy F.; Mellab, Karim; Granvik, Mikael; Kestilä, Antti; Kohout, Tomas; Muinonen, Karri; Näsilä, Antti; Penttila, Antti; Tikka, Tuomas; Tortora, Paolo; Ciarletti, Valérie; Hérique, Alain; Murdoch, Naomi; Asphaug, Erik; Rivkin, Andy; Barnouin, Olivier; Bagatin, Adriano Campo; Pravec, Petr; Richardson, Derek C.; Schwartz, Stephen R.; Tsiganis, Kleomenis; Ulamec, Stephan; Karatekin, Ozgür (October 2018). "European component of the AIDA mission to a binary asteroid: Characterization and interpretation of the impact of the DART mission" (PDF). Advances in Space Research. 62 (8): 2261–2272. Bibcode:2018AdSpR..62.2261M. doi:10.1016/j.asr.2017.12.020. S2CID 55274187.
