= Deep Impact (spacecraft) =

NASA space probe launched in 2005

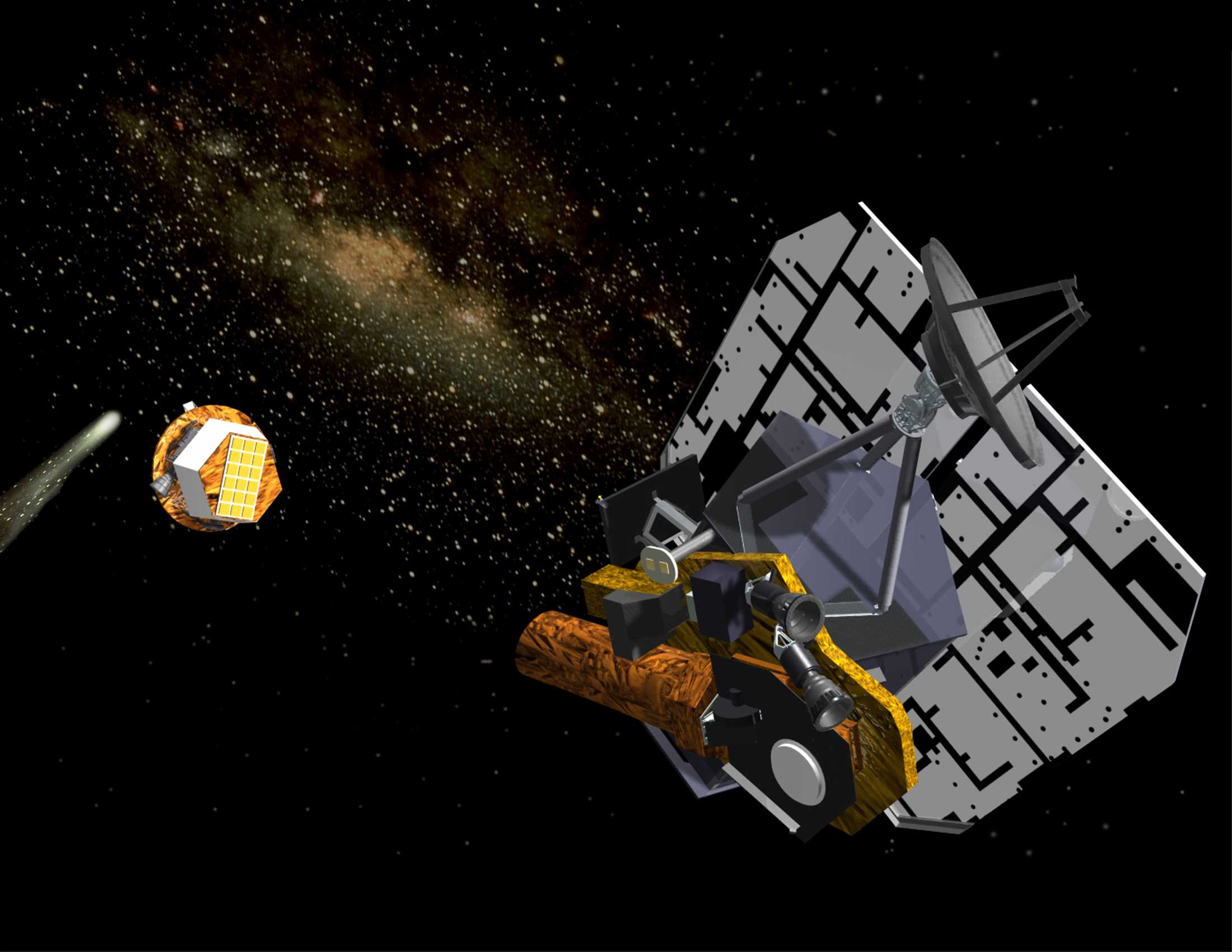
- Artist's impression of the Deep Impact space probe after deployment of the impactor
- Mission type: Flyby/impactor (9P/Tempel)
- Operator: NASA · JPL
- COSPAR ID: 2005-001A
- SATCAT no.: 28517
- Website: www.jpl.nasa.gov/missions/deep-impact/
- Mission duration: Final: 8 years, 6 months, 26 days

Spacecraft properties
- Manufacturer: Ball Aerospace · University of Maryland
- Launch mass: Total: 973 kg Spacecraft: 601 kg (1,325 lb); Impactor: 372 kg (820 lb)
- Dry mass: Total: 879 kg Spacecraft: 515 kg (1,135 lb); Impactor: 364 kg (802 lb)
- Dimensions: 3.3 × 1.7 × 2.3 m (10.8 × 5.6 × 7.5 ft)
- Power: 92 W (solar array / NiH_{2} battery)

Start of mission
- Launch date: January 12, 2005, 18:47:08 UTC
- Rocket: Delta II 7925 /PAM-D
- Launch site: Cape Canaveral SLC-17B
- Contractor: Boeing

End of mission
- Disposal: Contact lost
- Last contact: August 8, 2013

Flyby of Tempel 1
- Closest approach: July 4, 2005, 06:05 UTC
- Distance: 575 km (357 mi)

Tempel 1 impactor
- Impact date: July 4, 2005, 05:52 UTC

Flyby of Earth
- Closest approach: December 31, 2007, 19:29:20 UTC
- Distance: 15,567 km (9,673 mi)

Flyby of Earth
- Closest approach: December 29, 2008
- Distance: 43,450 km (27,000 mi)

Flyby of Earth
- Closest approach: June 28, 2010, 22:25:13 UTC
- Distance: 30,496 km (18,949 mi)

Flyby of Hartley 2
- Closest approach: November 4, 2010, 13:50:57 UTC
- Distance: 694 km (431 mi)
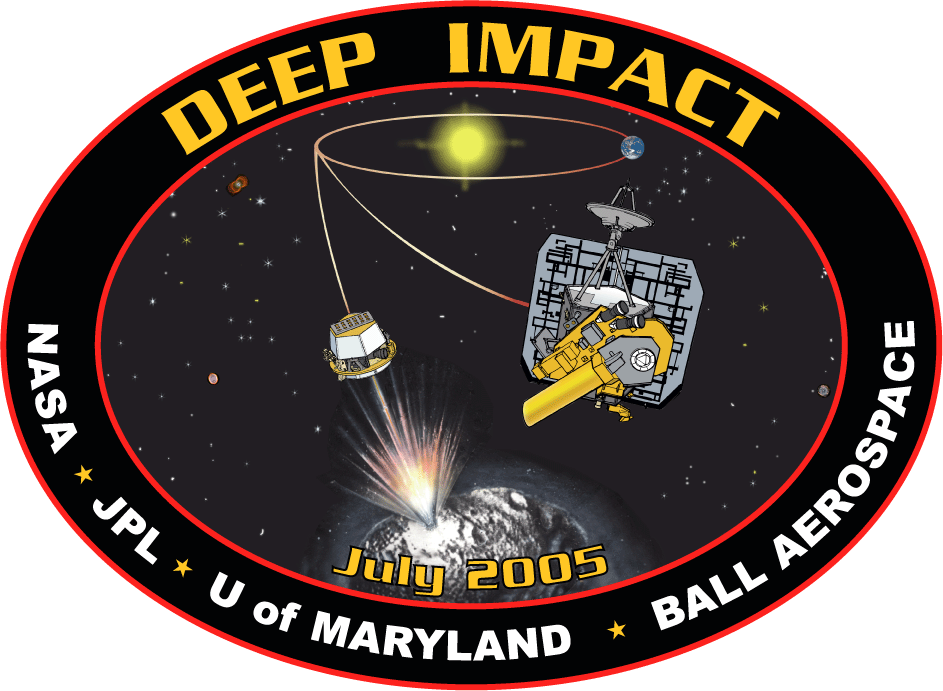
- Official insignia of the Deep Impact mission Discovery Program

Deep Impact was a NASA space probe launched from Cape Canaveral Air Force Station on January 12, 2005. It was designed to study the interior composition of the comet Tempel 1 (9P/Tempel), by releasing an impactor into the comet. At 05:52 UTC on July 4, 2005, the Impactor successfully collided with the comet's nucleus. The impact excavated debris from the interior of the nucleus, forming an impact crater. Photographs taken by the spacecraft showed the comet to be more dusty and less icy than had been expected. The impact generated an unexpectedly large and bright dust cloud, obscuring the view of the impact crater.

Previous space missions to comets, such as Giotto, Deep Space 1, and Stardust, were fly-by missions. These missions were able to photograph and examine only the surfaces of cometary nuclei, and even then from considerable distances. The Deep Impact mission was the first to eject material from a comet's surface, and the mission garnered considerable publicity from the media, international scientists, and amateur astronomers alike.

Upon the completion of its primary mission, proposals were made to further utilize the spacecraft. Consequently, Deep Impact flew by Earth on December 31, 2007, on its way to an extended mission, designated EPOXI, with a dual purpose to study extrasolar planets and comet Hartley 2 (103P/Hartley). Communication was unexpectedly lost in August 2013 while the craft was heading for another asteroid flyby.

== Scientific goals ==
The Deep Impact mission was planned to help answer fundamental questions about comets, which included what makes up the composition of the comet's nucleus, what depth the crater would reach from the impact, and where the comet originated in its formation. By observing the composition of the comet, astronomers hoped to determine how comets form based on the differences between the interior and exterior makeup of the comet.

The mission's Principal Investigator was Michael A'Hearn, an astronomer at the University of Maryland. He led the science team, which included members from Cornell University, University of Maryland, University of Arizona, Brown University, Belton Space Exploration Initiatives, JPL, University of Hawaii, SAIC, Ball Aerospace, and Max-Planck-Institut für extraterrestrische Physik.

== Spacecraft design and instrumentation ==
The spacecraft consists of two main sections, the 372-kilogram (820 lb) copper-core "Smart Impactor" that impacted the comet, and the 601 kg (1,325 lb) "Flyby" section, which imaged the comet from a safe distance during the encounter with Tempel 1.

The Flyby spacecraft is about 3.3 meters (10.8 ft) long, 1.7 meters (5.6 ft) wide and 2.3 meters (7.5 ft) high. It includes a solar panel, a Whipple debris shield, and several science instruments for imaging, infrared spectroscopy, and optical navigation to its destination near the comet. The spacecraft also carried two cameras, the High Resolution Imager (HRI), and the Medium Resolution Imager (MRI). The HRI is an imaging device that combines a visible-light camera with a filter wheel, and an imaging infrared spectrometer called the "Spectral Imaging Module" or SIM that operates on a spectral band from 1.05 to 4.8 micrometres. It has been optimized for observing the comet's nucleus. The MRI is the backup device, and was used primarily for navigation during the final 10-day approach. It also has a filter wheel, with a slightly different set of filters.

The Impactor section of the spacecraft contains an instrument that is optically identical to the MRI, called the Impactor Targeting Sensor (ITS), but without the filter wheel. Its dual purpose was to sense the Impactor's trajectory, which could then be adjusted up to four times between release and impact, and to image the comet from close range. As the Impactor neared the comet's surface, this camera took high-resolution pictures of the nucleus (as good as 0.2 meters per pixel [7.9 in/px]) that were transmitted in real-time to the Flyby spacecraft before the camera and Impactor were destroyed. The final image taken by the Impactor was snapped only 3.7 seconds before impact.

The Impactor's payload, dubbed the "Cratering Mass", was 100% copper, with a weight of 113 kg. Including this cratering mass, copper formed 49% of total mass of the Impactor (with aluminium at 24% of the total mass); this was to minimize interference with scientific measurements. Since copper was not expected to be found on a comet, scientists could ignore copper's signature in any spectrometer readings. Instead of using explosives, it was also cheaper to use copper as the payload.

Explosives would also have been superfluous. At its closing velocity of 10.2 km/s, the Impactor's kinetic energy was equivalent to 4.8 tonnes of TNT, considerably more than its actual mass of only 372 kg.

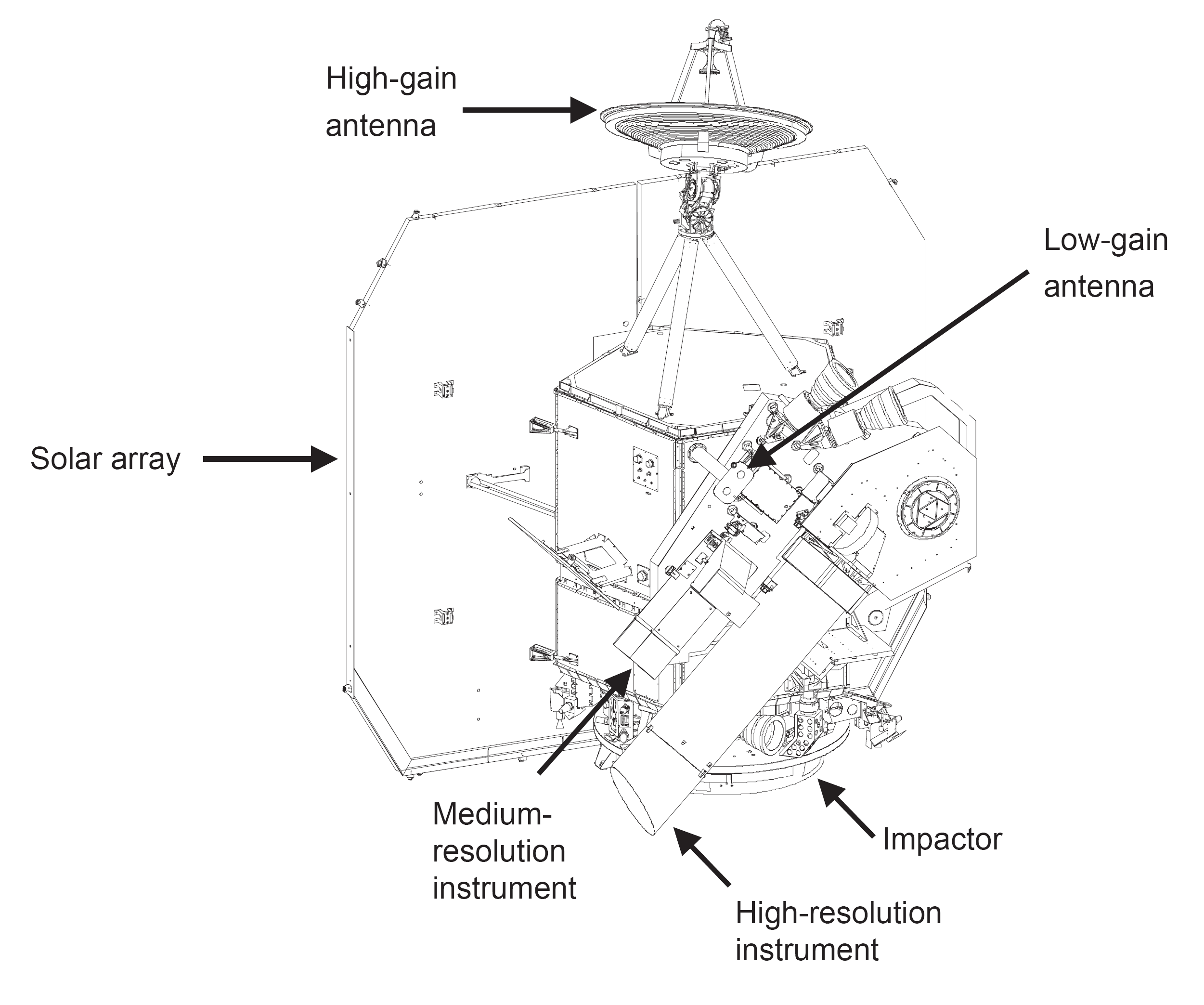
Deep Impact diagram

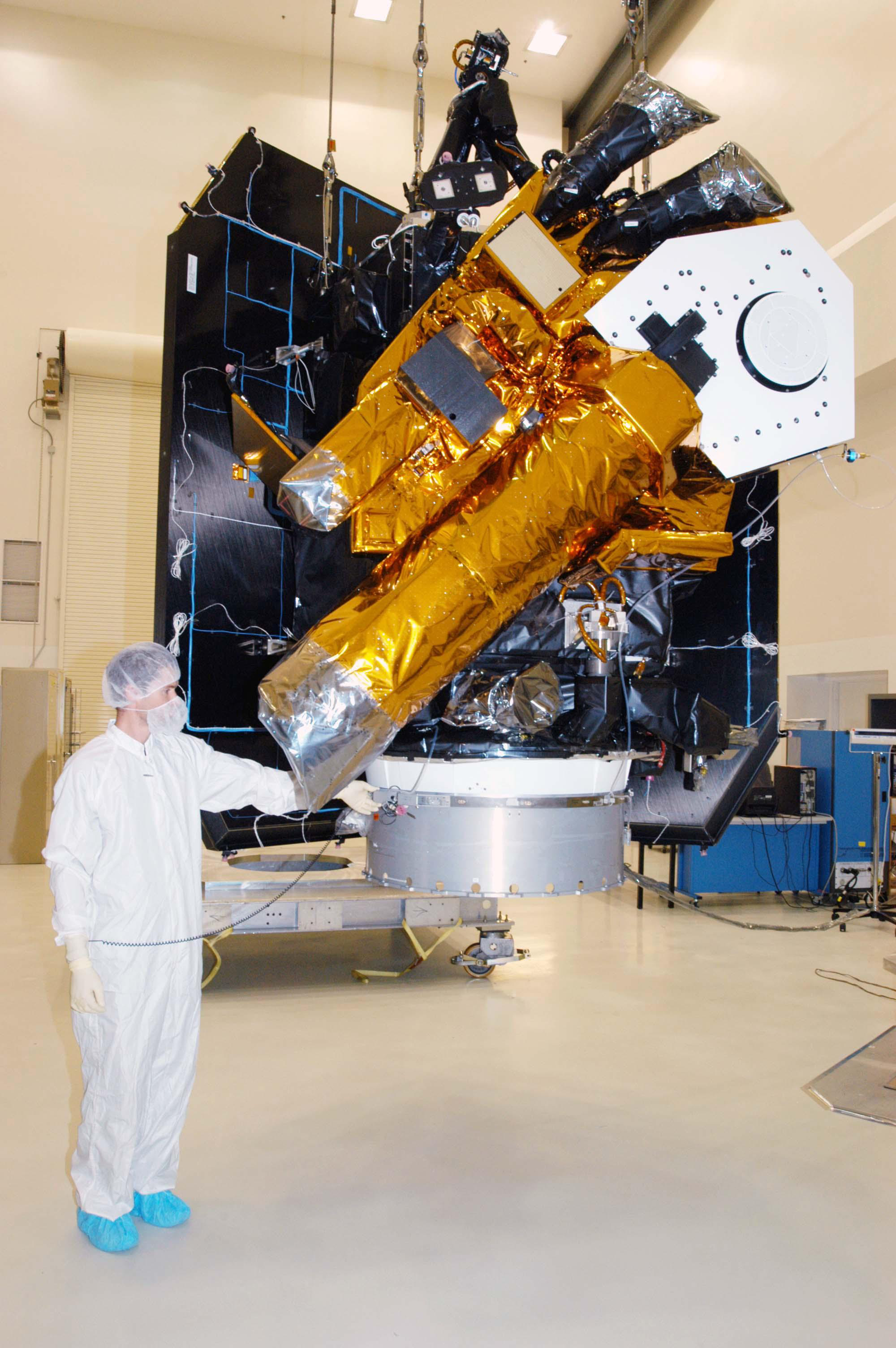
Deep Impact in a clean room

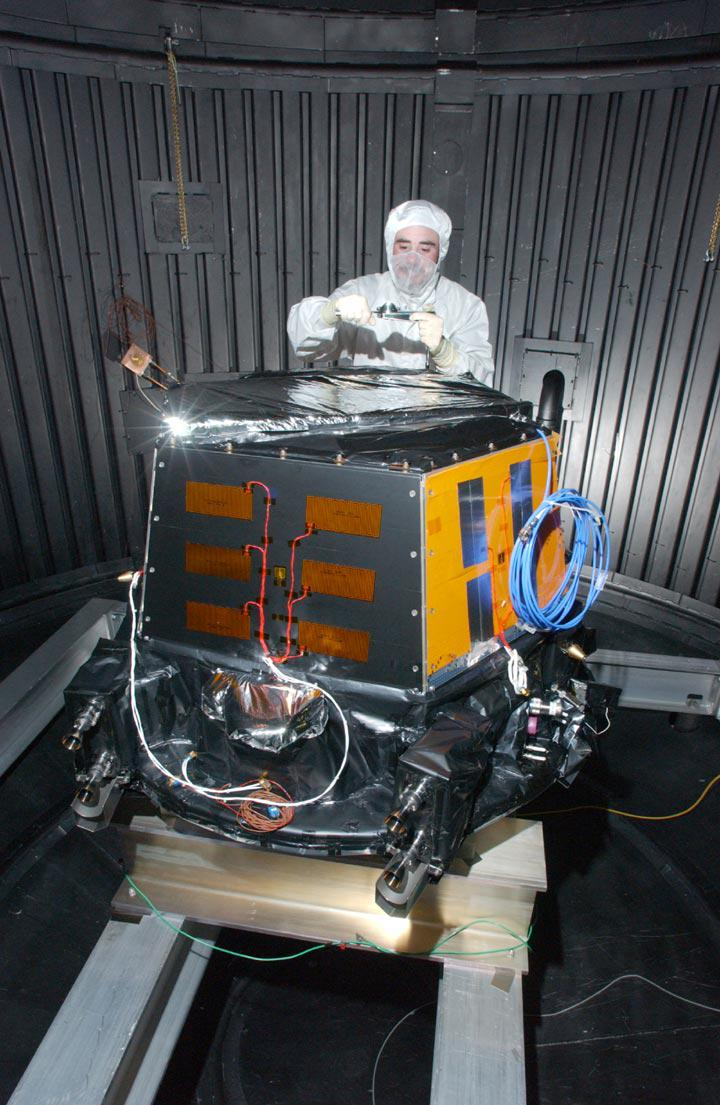
The Impactor

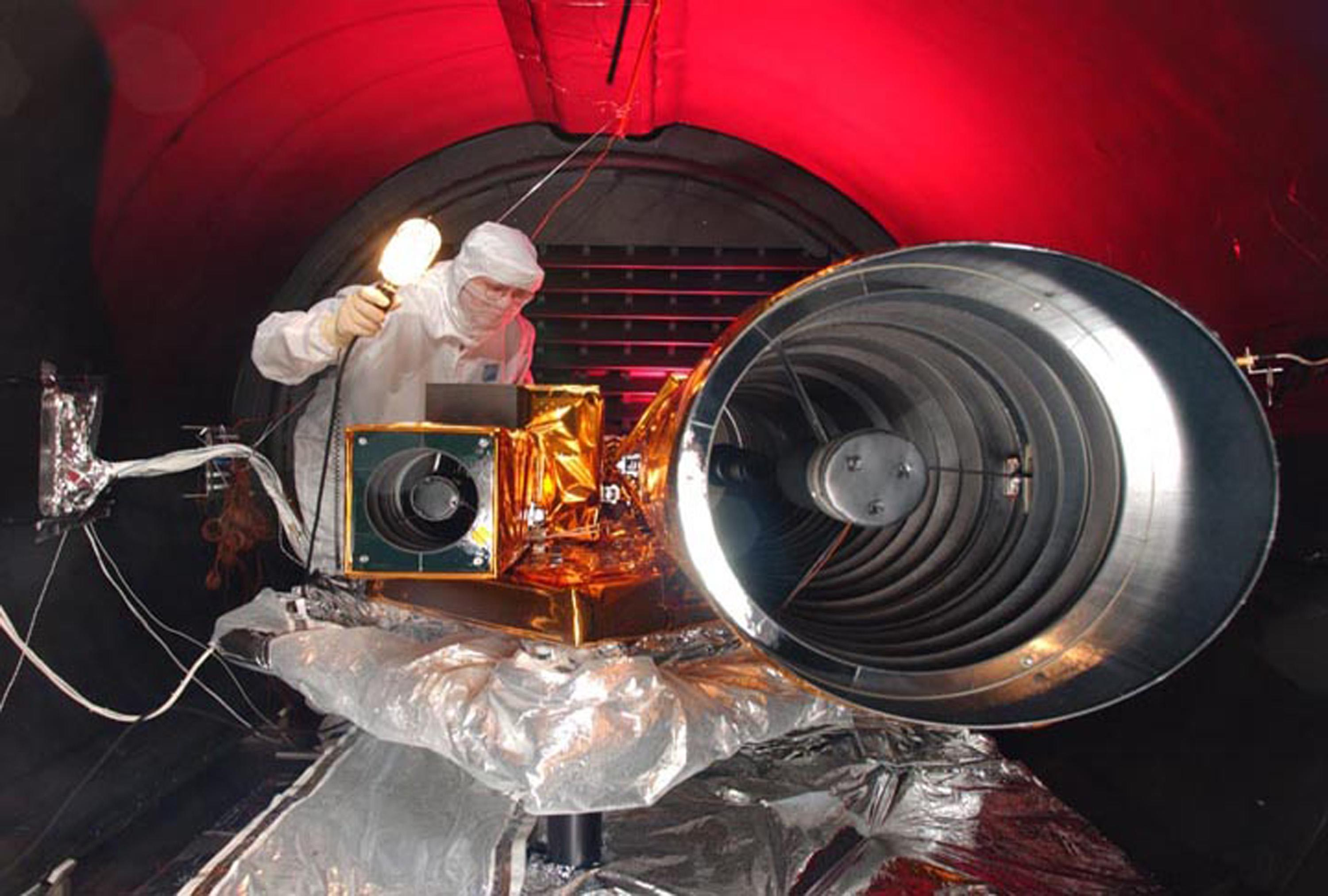
Cameras of the Flyby spacecraft, HRI at right, MRI at left

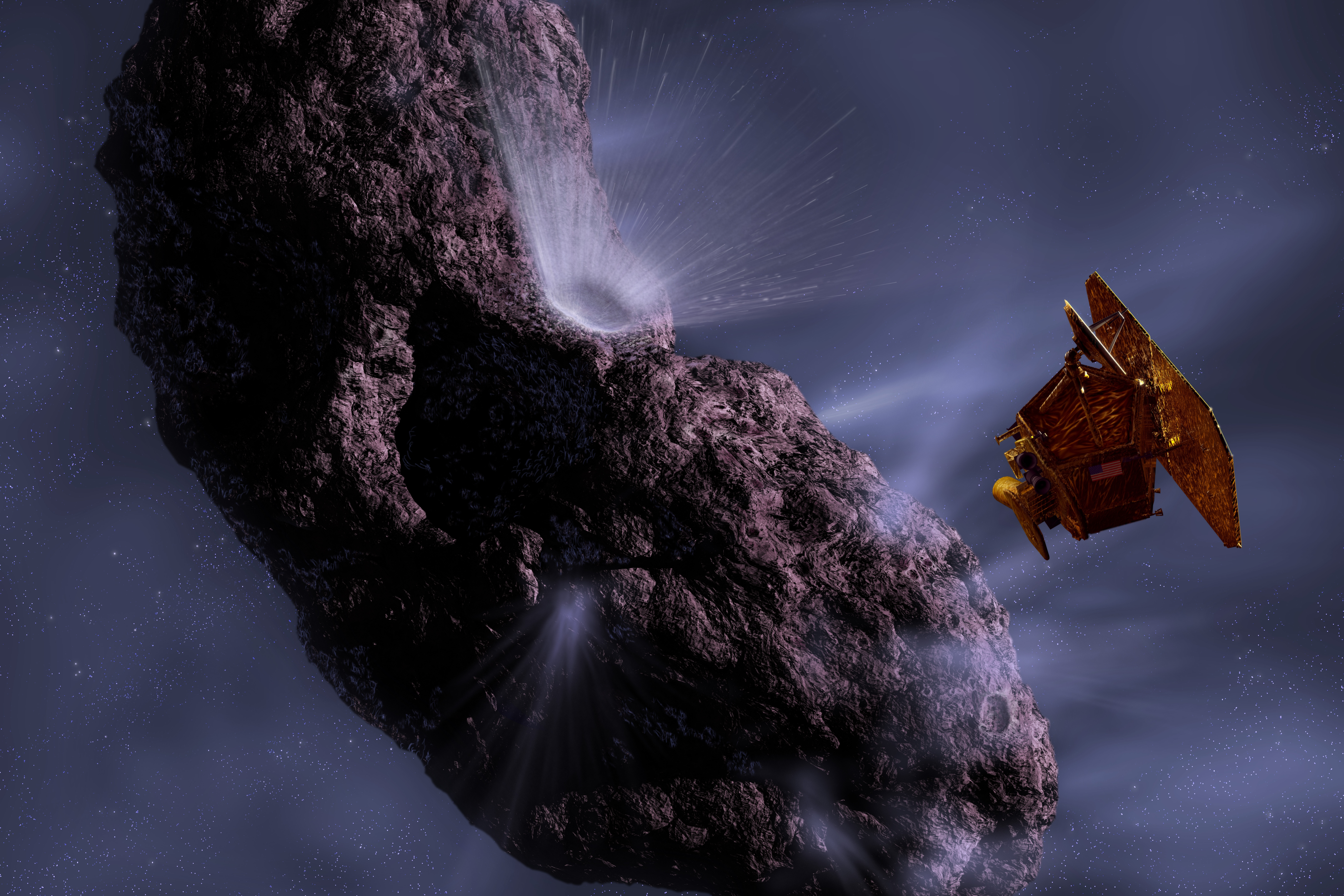
Artist's concept of the impact on Tempel 1

== Mission profile ==
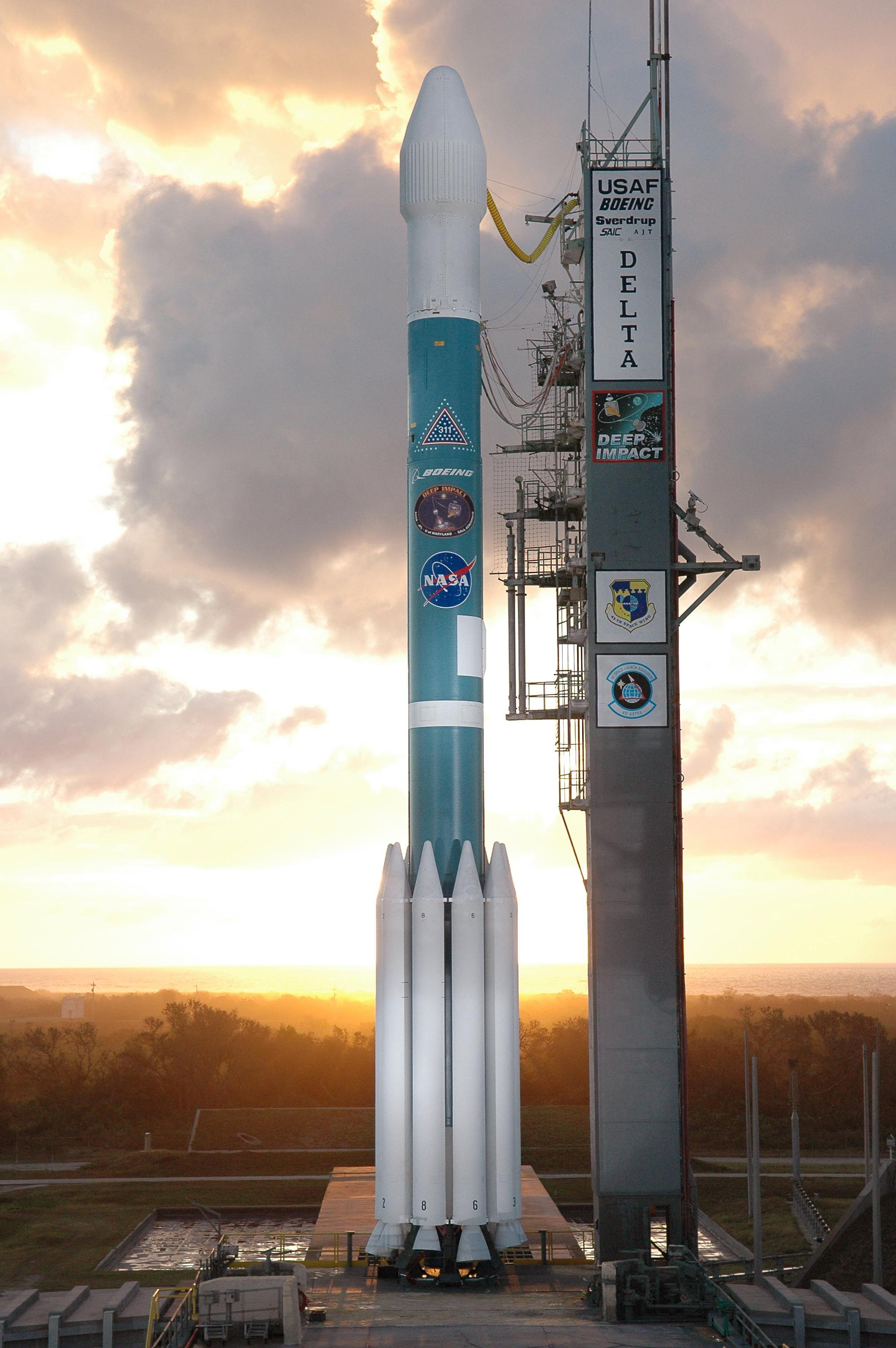
Deep Impact prior to launch on a Delta II rocket

Following its launch from Cape Canaveral Air Force Station pad SLC-17B at 18:47 UTC on January 12, 2005, the Deep Impact spacecraft traveled 429 million km (267 million mi) in 174 days to reach comet Tempel 1 at a cruising speed of 28.6 km/s (103,000 km/h; 64,000 mph). Once the spacecraft reached the vicinity of the comet on July 3, 2005, it separated into the Impactor and Flyby sections. The Impactor used its thrusters to move into the path of the comet, impacting 24 hours later at a relative speed of 10.3 km/s (37,000 km/h; 23,000 mph). The Impactor delivered 1.96×10^{10} joules of kinetic energy—the equivalent of 4.7 tons of TNT. Scientists believed that the energy of the high-velocity collision would be sufficient to excavate a crater up to 100 m (330 ft) wide, larger than the bowl of the Roman Colosseum. The size of the crater was still not known one year after the impact. The Stardust spacecraft observed the impact site in 2011; it was determined that the crater's diameter is around 150 meters (490 ft).

Just minutes after the impact, the Flyby probe passed by the nucleus at a close distance of 500 km (310 mi), taking pictures of the crater position, the ejecta plume, and the entire cometary nucleus. The entire event was also photographed by Earth-based telescopes and orbital observatories, including Hubble, Chandra, Spitzer, and XMM-Newton. The impact was also observed by cameras and spectroscopes on board Europe's Rosetta spacecraft, which was about 80 million km (50 million mi) from the comet at the time of impact. Rosetta determined the composition of the gas and dust cloud that was kicked up by the impact.

== Mission events ==
Animation of Deep Impact's trajectory from January 12, 2005, to August 8, 2013 Deep Impact · Tempel 1 · Earth · 103P/Hartley

=== Before launch ===
A comet-impact mission was first proposed to NASA in 1996, but at the time, NASA engineers were skeptical that the target could be hit. In 1999, a revised and technologically upgraded mission proposal, dubbed Deep Impact, was accepted and funded as part of NASA's Discovery Program of low-cost spacecraft. The two spacecraft (Impactor and Flyby) and the three main instruments were built and integrated by Ball Aerospace & Technologies in Boulder, Colorado. Developing the software for the spacecraft took 18 months and the application code consisted of 20,000 lines and 19 different application threads. The total cost of developing the spacecraft and completing its mission reached US$330 million.

=== Launch and commissioning phase ===
The probe was originally scheduled for launch on December 30, 2004, but NASA officials delayed its launch, in order to allow more time for testing the software. It was successfully launched from Cape Canaveral on January 12, 2005, at 1:47 pm EST (1847 UTC) by a Delta II rocket.

Deep Impact's state of health was uncertain during the first day after launch. Shortly after entering orbit around the Sun and deploying its solar panels, the probe switched itself to safe mode. The cause of the problem was simply an incorrect temperature limit in the fault protection logic for the spacecraft's RCS thruster catalyst beds. The spacecraft's thrusters were used to detumble the spacecraft following third stage separation. On January 13, 2005, NASA announced that the probe was out of safe mode and healthy.

On February 11, 2005, Deep Impact's rockets were fired as planned to correct the spacecraft's course. This correction was so precise that the next planned correction maneuver on March 31, 2005, was unnecessary and canceled. The "commissioning phase" verified that all instruments were activated and checked out. During these tests it was found that the HRI images were not in focus after it underwent a bake-out period. After mission members investigated the problem, on June 9, 2005, it was announced that by using image processing software and the mathematical technique of deconvolution, the HRI images could be corrected to restore much of the resolution anticipated.

=== Cruise phase ===
A conceptualized view of the impact, beginning with the Deep Impact spacecraft releasing a probe into the path of comet Tempel 1.

The "cruise phase" began on March 25, 2005, immediately after the commissioning phase was completed. This phase continued until about 60 days before the encounter with comet Tempel 1. On April 25, 2005, the probe acquired the first image of its target at a distance of 64 million km (40 million mi).

On May 4, 2005, the spacecraft executed its second trajectory correction maneuver. Burning its rocket engine for 95 seconds, the spacecraft speed was changed by 18.2 km/h (11.3 mph). Rick Grammier, the project manager for the mission at NASA's Jet Propulsion Laboratory, reacted to the maneuver stating that "spacecraft performance has been excellent, and this burn was no different... it was a textbook maneuver that placed us right on the money."

=== Approach phase ===
The approach phase extended from 60 days before encounter (May 5, 2005) until five days before encounter. Sixty days out was the earliest time that the Deep Impact spacecraft was expected to detect the comet with its MRI camera. In fact, the comet was spotted ahead of schedule, 69 days before impact (see Cruise phase above). On June 14 and 22, 2005, Deep Impact observed two outbursts of activity from the comet, the latter being six times larger than the former. The spacecraft studied the images of various distant stars to determine its current trajectory and position. Don Yeomans, a mission co-investigator for JPL pointed out that "it takes 7½ minutes for the signal to get back to Earth, so you cannot joystick this thing. You have to rely on the fact that the Impactor is a smart spacecraft as is the Flyby spacecraft. So you have to build in the intelligence ahead of time and let it do its thing." On June 23, 2005, the first of the two final trajectory correction maneuvers (targeting maneuver) was successfully executed. A 13 mph (5.8 m/s) velocity change was needed to adjust the flight path towards the comet and target the Impactor at a window in space about 100 kilometers (62 mi) wide.

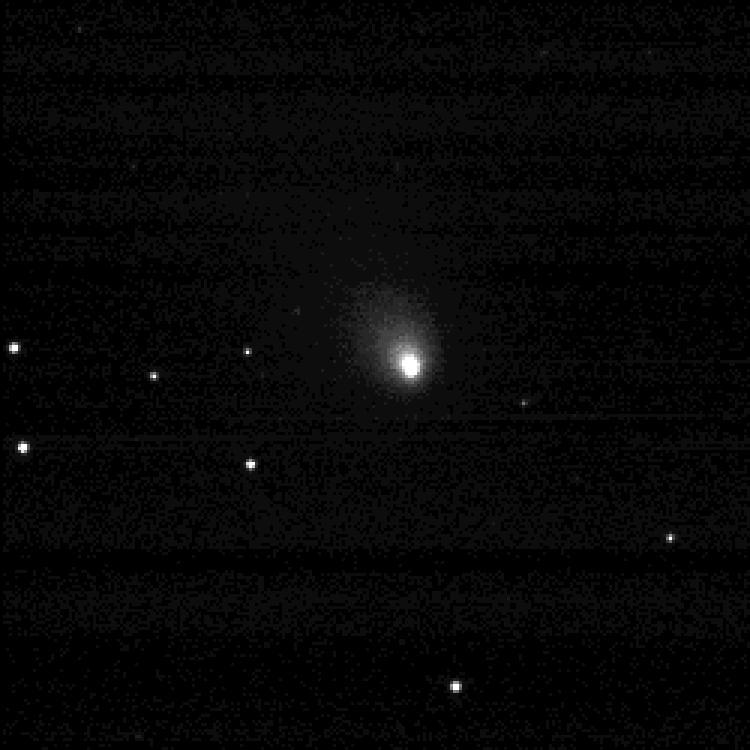
Tempel 1 imaged on April 25, 2005

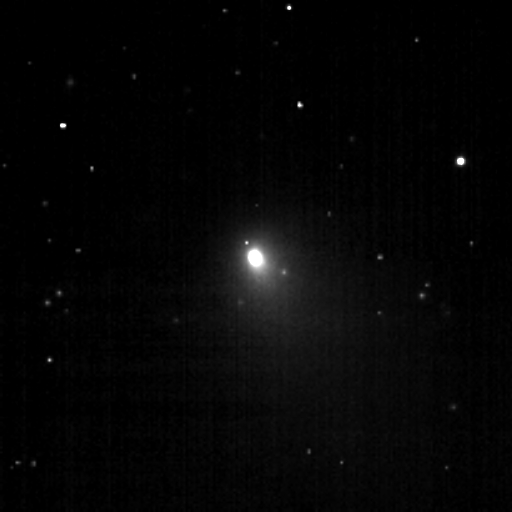
May 30, 2005, 35 days from impact

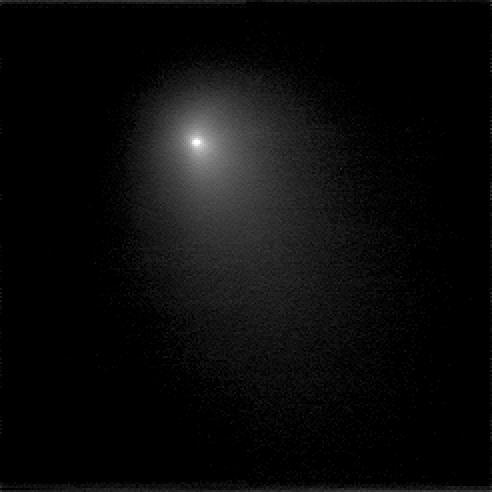
June 15, 19 days from impact

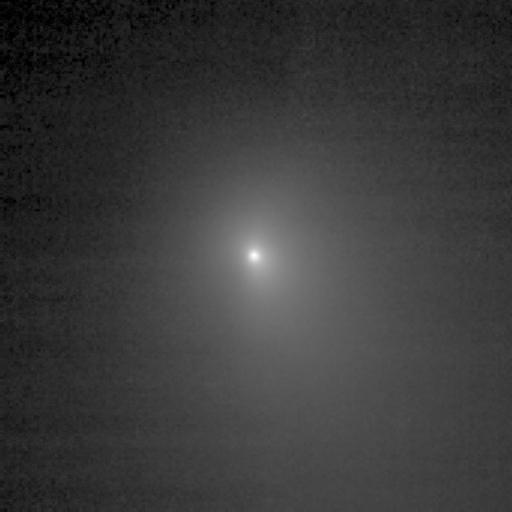
June 21, 13 days from impact

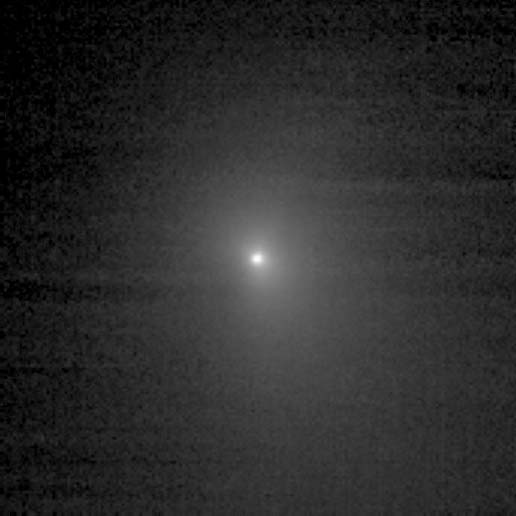
June 27, 7 days from impact, near end of approach phase

=== Impact phase ===
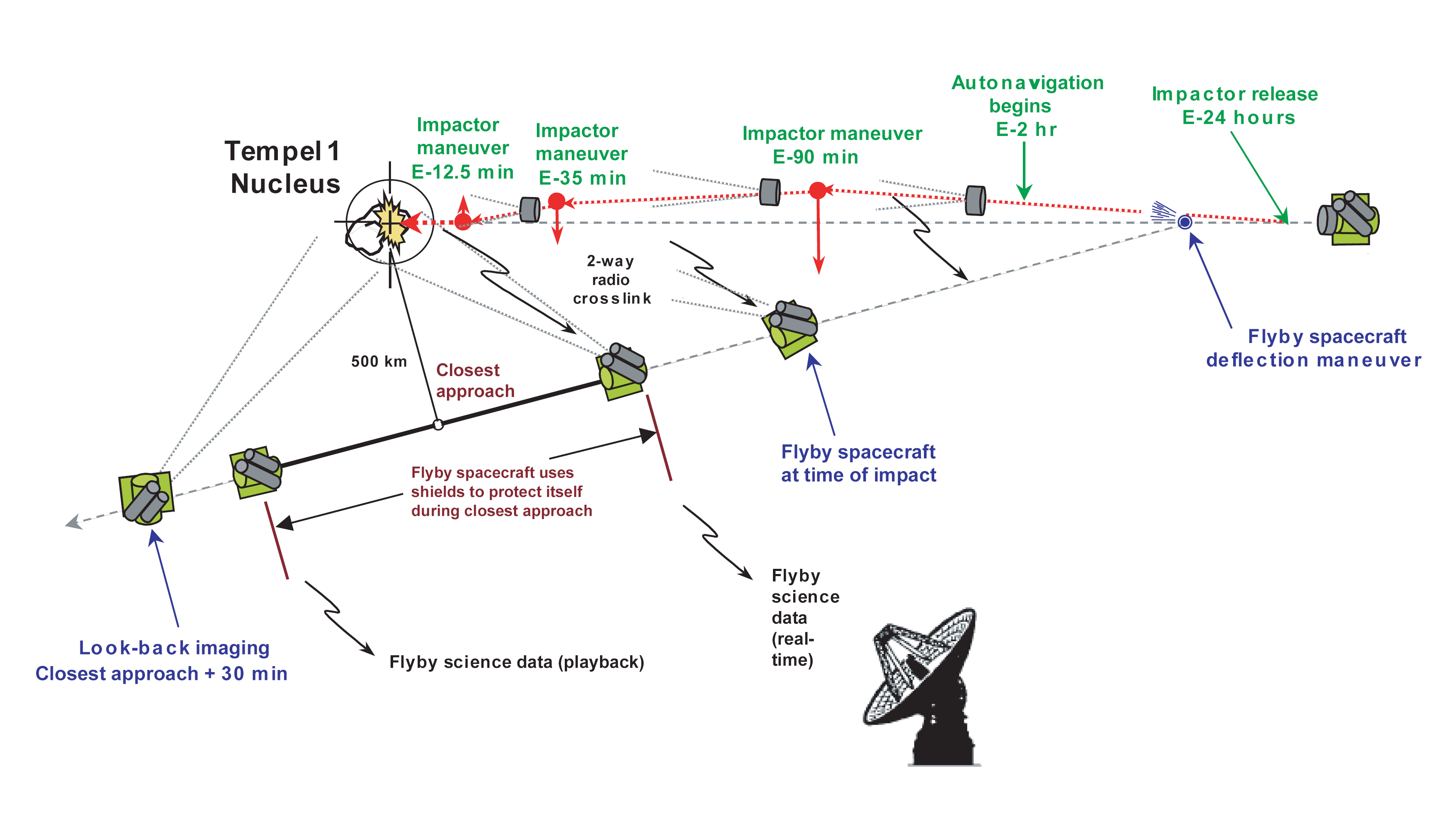
Deep Impact comet encounter sequence

Impact phase began nominally on June 29, 2005, five days before impact. The Impactor successfully separated from the Flyby spacecraft on July 3 at 6:00 UTC (6:07 UTC ERT). The first images from the instrumented Impactor were seen two hours after separation.

The Flyby spacecraft performed one of two divert maneuvers to avoid damage. A 14-minute burn was executed which slowed down the spacecraft. It was also reported that the communication link between the Flyby and the Impactor was functioning as expected. The Impactor executed three correction maneuvers in the final two hours before impact.

The Impactor was maneuvered to plant itself in front of the comet, so that Tempel 1 would collide with it. Impact occurred at 05:45 UTC (05:52 UTC ERT, +/− up to three minutes, one-way light time = 7m 26s) on the morning of July 4, 2005.

The impactor returned images as late as three seconds before impact. Most of the data captured was stored on board the Flyby spacecraft, which radioed approximately 4,500 images from the HRI, MRI, and ITS cameras to Earth over the next few days. The energy from the collision was similar in size to exploding five tons of dynamite and the comet shone six times brighter than normal.

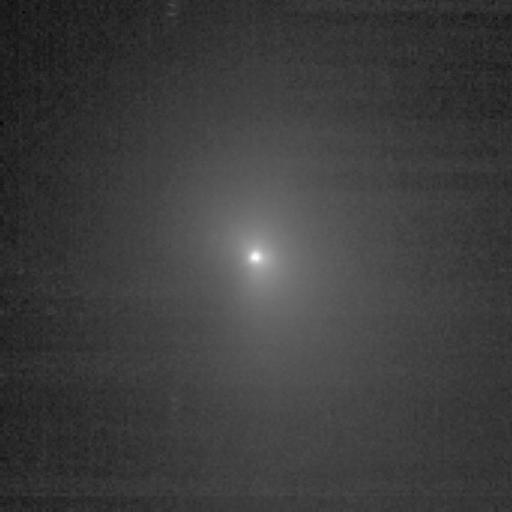
Comet Tempel 1, imaged from 4.2 million km at the start of Impact phase

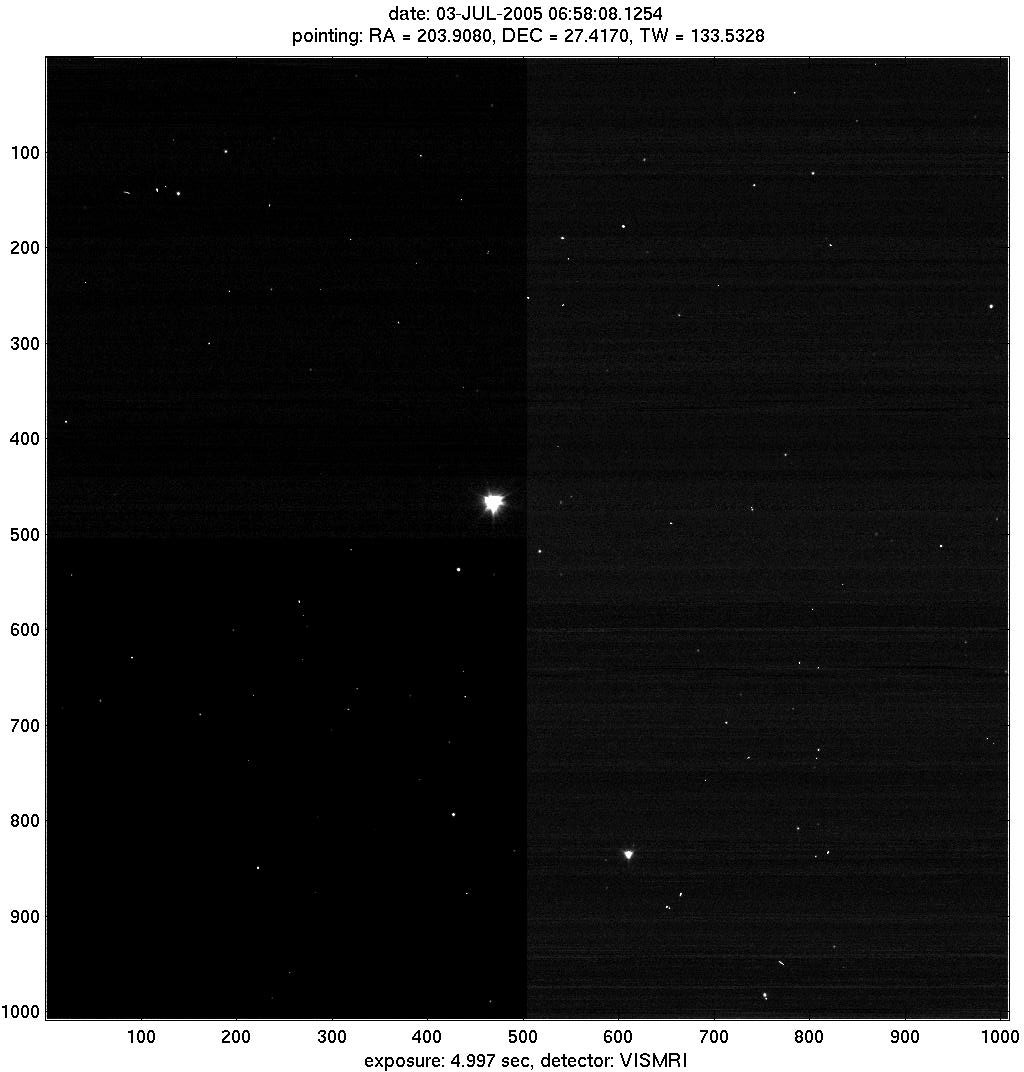
Impactor imaged by Flyby spacecraft shortly after separation

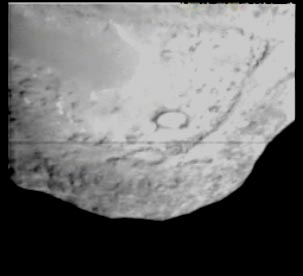
Image from Impactor

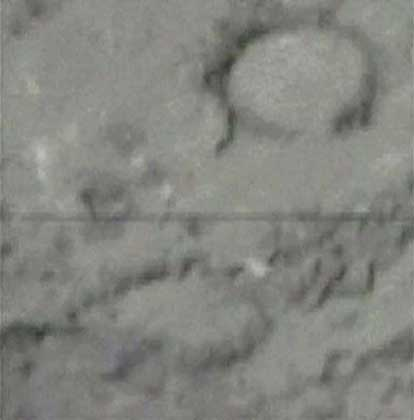
Impactor close-up image, taken shortly before impact

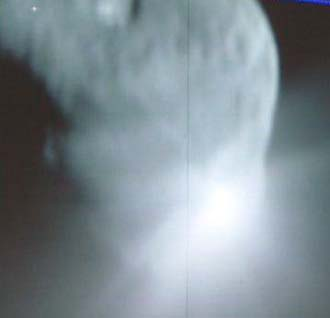
The moment of impact, as shown on NASA TV

HRI movie of impact

High Resolution Instrument, Visual CCD (HRIV) during encounter (video)

Impactor Targeting Sensor, Visual CCD (ITS) during encounter (video)

== Results ==
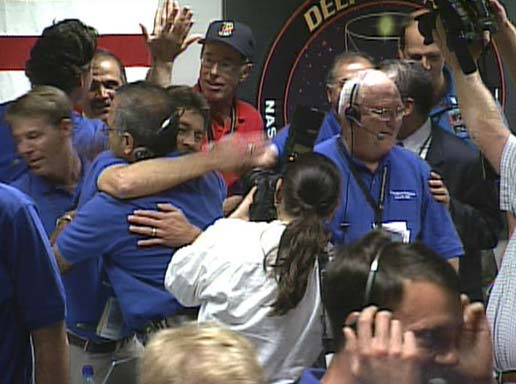
Mission team members celebrate after the impact with the comet.

Mission control did not become aware of the Impactor's success until five minutes later at 05:57 UTC. Don Yeomans confirmed the results for the press, "We hit it just exactly where we wanted to" and JPL Director Charles Elachi stated "The success exceeded our expectations."

In the post-impact briefing on July 4, 2005, at 08:00 UTC, the first processed images revealed existing craters on the comet. NASA scientists stated they could not see the new crater that had formed from the Impactor, but it was later discovered to be about 100 meters wide and up to 30 meters (98 ft) deep. Lucy McFadden, one of the co-investigators of the impact, stated "We didn't expect the success of one part of the mission [bright dust cloud] to affect a second part [seeing the resultant crater]. But that is part of the fun of science, to meet with the unexpected." Analysis of data from the Swift X-ray telescope showed that the comet continued outgassing from the impact for 13 days, with a peak five days after impact. A total of 5 million kg (11 million lb) of water and between 10 and 25 million kg (22 and 55 million lb) of dust were lost from the impact.

Initial results were surprising as the material excavated by the impact contained more dust and less ice than had been expected. The only models of cometary structure astronomers could positively rule out were the very porous ones which had comets as loose aggregates of material. In addition, the material was finer than expected; scientists compared it to talcum powder rather than sand. Other materials found while studying the impact included clays, carbonates, sodium, and crystalline silicates which were found by studying the spectroscopy of the impact. Clays and carbonates usually require liquid water to form and sodium is rare in space. Observations also revealed that the comet was about 75% empty space, and one astronomer compared the outer layers of the comet to the same makeup of a snow bank. Astronomers have expressed interest in more missions to different comets to determine if they share similar compositions or if there are different materials found deeper within comets that were produced at the time of the Solar System's formation.

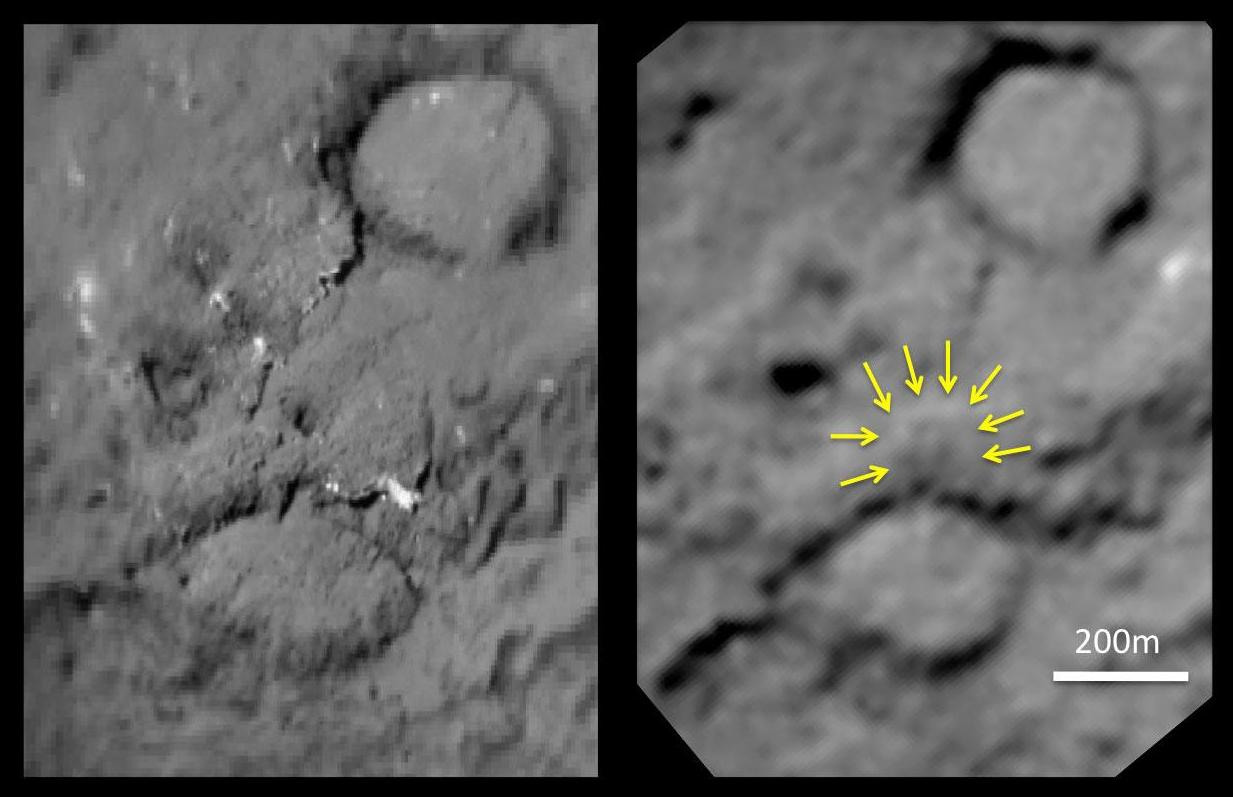
'Before and after' comparison images from Deep Impact and Stardust, showing the crater formed by Deep Impact on the right hand image

Astronomers hypothesized, based on its interior chemistry, that the comet formed in the Uranus and Neptune Oort cloud region of the Solar System. A comet which forms farther from the Sun is expected to have greater amounts of ices with low freezing temperatures, such as ethane, which was present in Tempel 1. Astronomers believe that other comets with compositions similar to Tempel 1 are likely to have formed in the same region.

=== Crater ===
Because the quality of the images of the crater formed during the Deep Impact collision was not satisfactory, on July 3, 2007, NASA approved the New Exploration of Tempel 1 (or NExT) mission. The mission utilized the already existing Stardust spacecraft, which had studied Comet Wild 2 in 2004. Stardust was placed into a new orbit so that it passed by Tempel 1 at a distance of approximately 200 km (120 mi) on February 15, 2011, at 04:42 UTC. This was the first time that a comet was visited by two probes on separate occasions (1P/Halley had been visited by several probes within a few weeks in 1986), and it provided an opportunity to better observe the crater that was created by Deep Impact as well as observing the changes caused by the comet's latest close approach to the Sun.

On February 15, NASA scientists identified the crater formed by Deep Impact in images from Stardust. The crater is estimated to be 150 meters (490 ft) in diameter, and has a bright mound in the center likely created when material from the impact fell back into the crater.

== Public interest ==
The mission coincidentally shared its name with the 1998 film, Deep Impact, in which a comet strikes the Earth.

=== Media coverage ===
The image of the impact which was widely circulated in the media

The impact was a substantial news event reported and discussed online, in print, and on television. There was a genuine suspense because experts held widely differing opinions over the result of the impact. Various experts debated whether the Impactor would go straight through the comet and out the other side, would create an impact crater, would open up a hole in the interior of the comet, and other theories. However, twenty-four hours before impact, the flight team at JPL began privately expressing a high level of confidence that, barring any unforeseen technical glitches, the spacecraft would intercept Tempel 1. One senior personnel member stated "All we can do now is sit back and wait. Everything we can technically do to ensure impact has been done." In the final minutes as the Impactor hit the comet, more than 10,000 people watched the collision on a giant movie screen at Hawaii's Waikīkī Beach.

Experts came up with a range of soundbites to summarize the mission to the public. Iwan Williams of Queen Mary University of London, said "It was like a mosquito hitting a 747. What we've found is that the mosquito didn't splat on the surface; it's actually gone through the windscreen."

One day after the impact, Marina Bay, a Russian astrologer, sued NASA for US$300 million for having "ruin[ed] the natural balance of forces in the universe." Her lawyer asked the public to volunteer to help in the claim by declaring "The impact changed the magnetic properties of the comet, and this could have affected mobile telephony here on Earth. If your phone went down this morning, ask yourself Why? and then get in touch with us." On August 9, 2005, the Presnensky Court of Moscow ruled against Bay, although she did attempt to appeal the result. One Russian physicist said that the impact had no effect on Earth and "the change to the orbit of the comet after the collision was only about 10 cm (3.9 in)."

=== Send Your Name To A Comet campaign ===
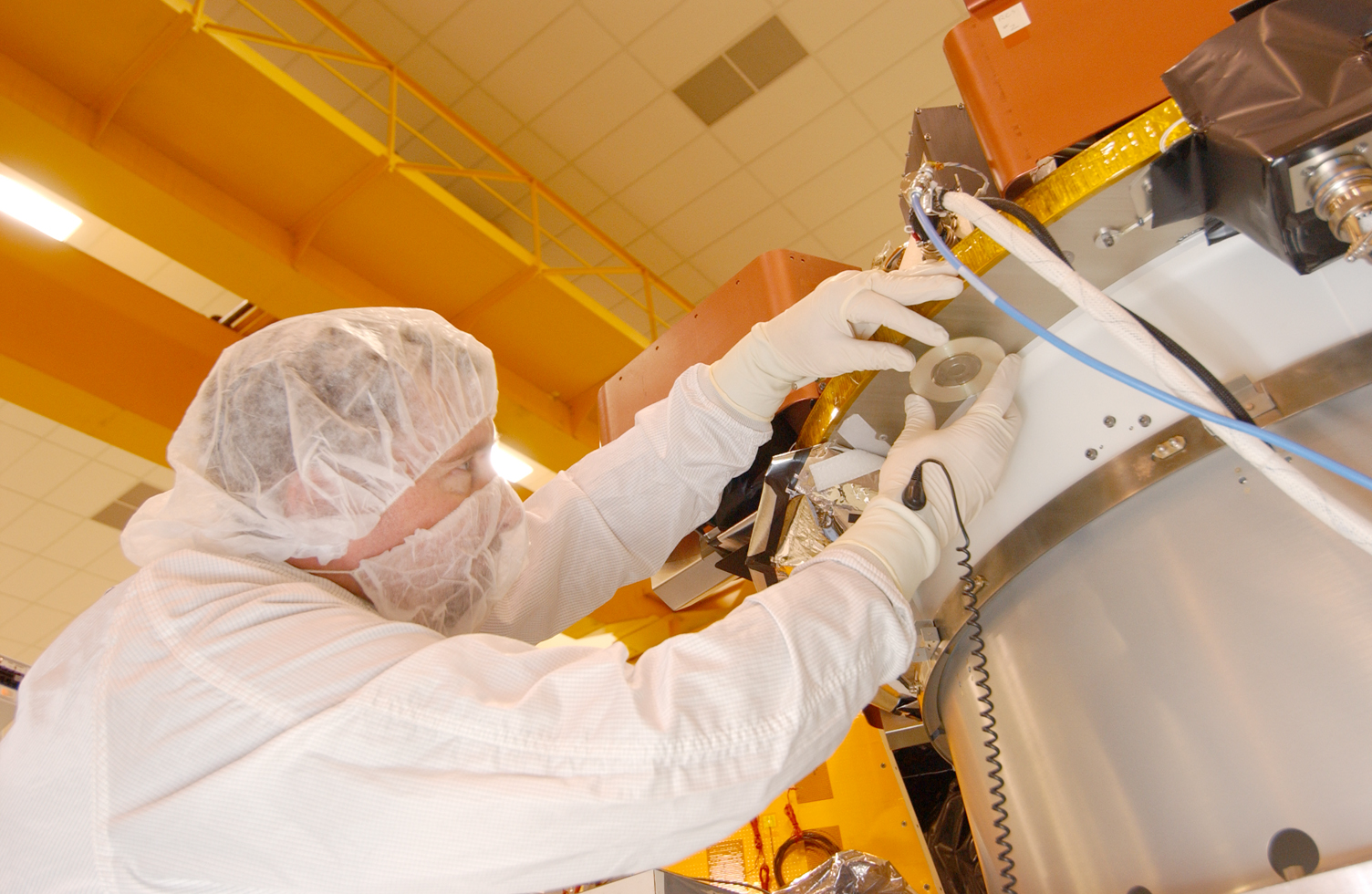
The CD containing the 625,000 names is added to the Impactor

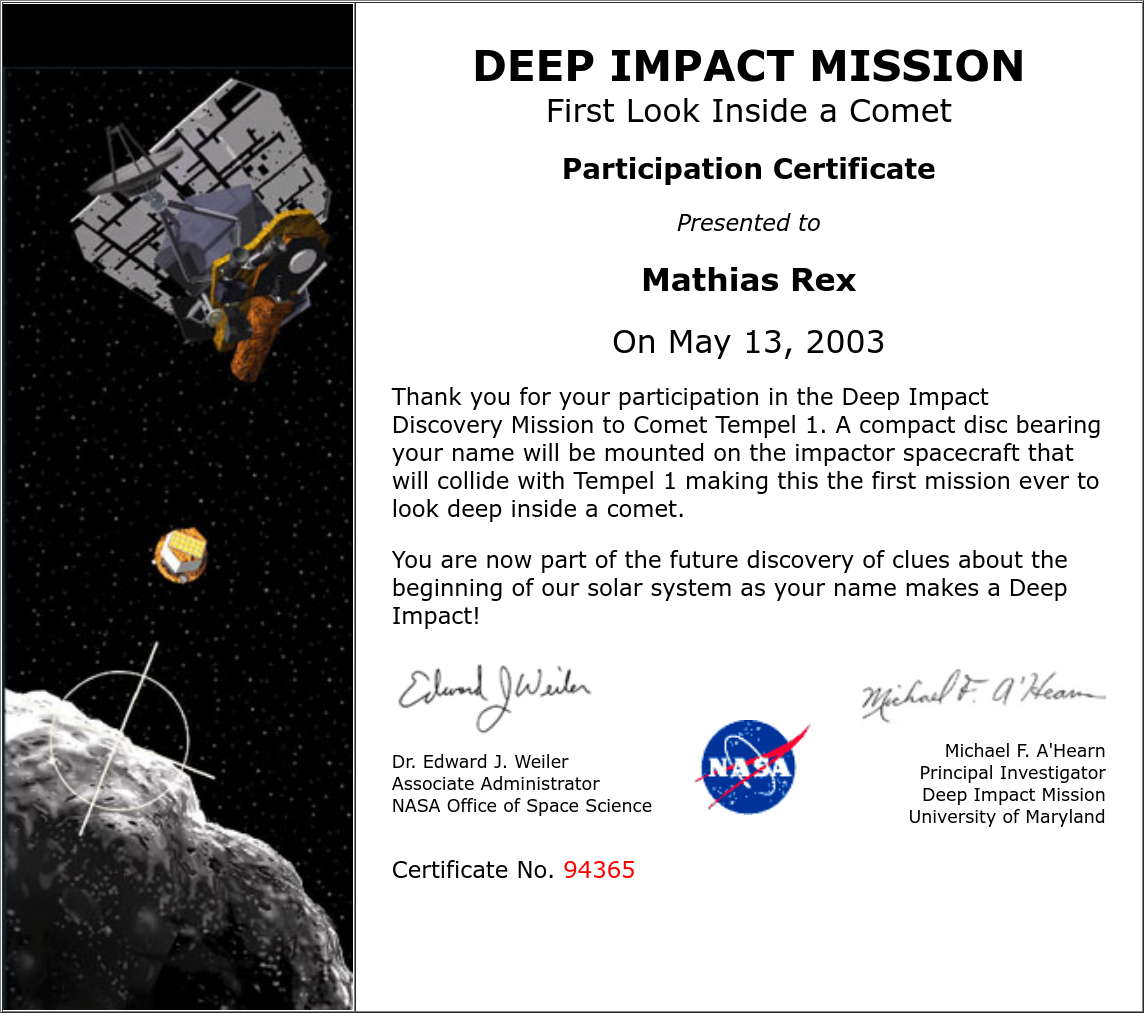
Deep Impact participation certificate of Mathias Rex

The mission was notable for one of its promotional campaigns, "Send Your Name To A Comet!". Visitors to the Jet Propulsion Laboratory's website were invited to submit their name between May 2003 and January 2004, and the names gathered—some 625,000 in all—were then burnt onto a mini-CD, which was attached to the Impactor. Dr. Don Yeomans, a member of the spacecraft's scientific team, stated "this is an opportunity to become part of an extraordinary space mission ... when the craft is launched in December 2004, yours and the names of your loved-ones can hitch along for the ride and be part of what may be the best space fireworks show in history." The idea was credited with driving interest in the mission.

=== Reaction from China ===
Chinese researchers used the Deep Impact mission as an opportunity to highlight the efficiency of American science because public support ensured the possibility of funding long-term research. By contrast, "in China, the public usually has no idea what our scientists are doing, and limited funding for the promotion of science weakens people's enthusiasm for research."

Two days after the US mission succeeded in having a probe collide with a comet, China revealed a plan: landing a probe on a small comet or asteroid to push it off course. China said it would begin the mission after sending a probe to the Moon.

=== Contributions from amateur astronomers ===
Since observing time on large, professional telescopes such as Keck or Hubble is always scarce, the Deep Impact scientists called upon "advanced amateur, student, and professional astronomers" to use small telescopes to make long-term observations of the target comet before and after impact. The purpose of these observations was to look for "volatile outgassing, dust coma development and dust production rates, dust tail development, and jet activity and outbursts." By mid-2007, amateur astronomers had submitted over a thousand CCD images of the comet.

One notable amateur observation was by students from schools in Hawaii, working with US and UK scientists, who during the press conference took live images using the Faulkes Automatic Telescope in Hawaii (the students operated the telescope over the Internet) and were one of the first groups to get images of the impact. One amateur astronomer reported seeing a structureless bright cloud around the comet, and an estimated 2 magnitude increase in brightness after the impact. Amateur astronomer Jost Jahn published a map of the crash area from NASA images.

=== Musical tribute ===
The Deep Impact mission coincided with celebrations in the Los Angeles area marking the 50th anniversary of "Rock Around the Clock" by Bill Haley & His Comets becoming the first rock and roll single to reach No. 1 on the recording sales charts. Within 24 hours of the mission's success, a 2-minute music video produced by Martin Lewis had been created using images of the impact itself combined with computer animation of the Deep Impact probe in flight, interspersed with footage of Bill Haley & His Comets performing in 1955 and the surviving original members of The Comets performing in March 2005.

On July 5, 2005, the surviving original members of The Comets (ranging in age from 71–84) performed a free concert for hundreds of employees of the Jet Propulsion Laboratory to help them celebrate the mission's success. This event received worldwide press attention. In February 2006, the International Astronomical Union citation that officially named asteroid 79896 Billhaley included a reference to the JPL concert.

== Extended mission ==
Deep Impact embarked on an extended mission designated EPOXI (Extrasolar Planet Observation and Deep Impact Extended Investigation) to visit other comets, after being put to sleep in 2005 upon completion of the Tempel 1 mission.

=== Comet Boethin plan ===
Its first extended visit was to do a flyby of Comet Boethin, but with some complications. On July 21, 2005, Deep Impact executed a trajectory correction maneuver that allows the spacecraft to use Earth's gravity to begin a new mission in a path towards another comet.

The original plan was for a December 5, 2008, flyby of Comet Boethin, coming within 700 kilometers (430 mi) of the comet. Michael A'Hearn, the Deep Impact team leader, explained "We propose to direct the spacecraft for a flyby of Comet Boethin to investigate whether the results found at Comet Tempel 1 are unique or are also found on other comets." The $40 million mission would provide about half of the information as the collision of Tempel 1 but at a fraction of the cost. Deep Impact would use its spectrometer to study the comet's surface composition and its telescope for viewing the surface features.

However, as the December 2007 Earth gravity assist approached, astronomers were unable to locate Comet Boethin, which may have broken up into pieces too faint to be observed. Consequently, its orbit could not be calculated with sufficient precision to permit a flyby.

=== Flyby of Comet Hartley 2 ===
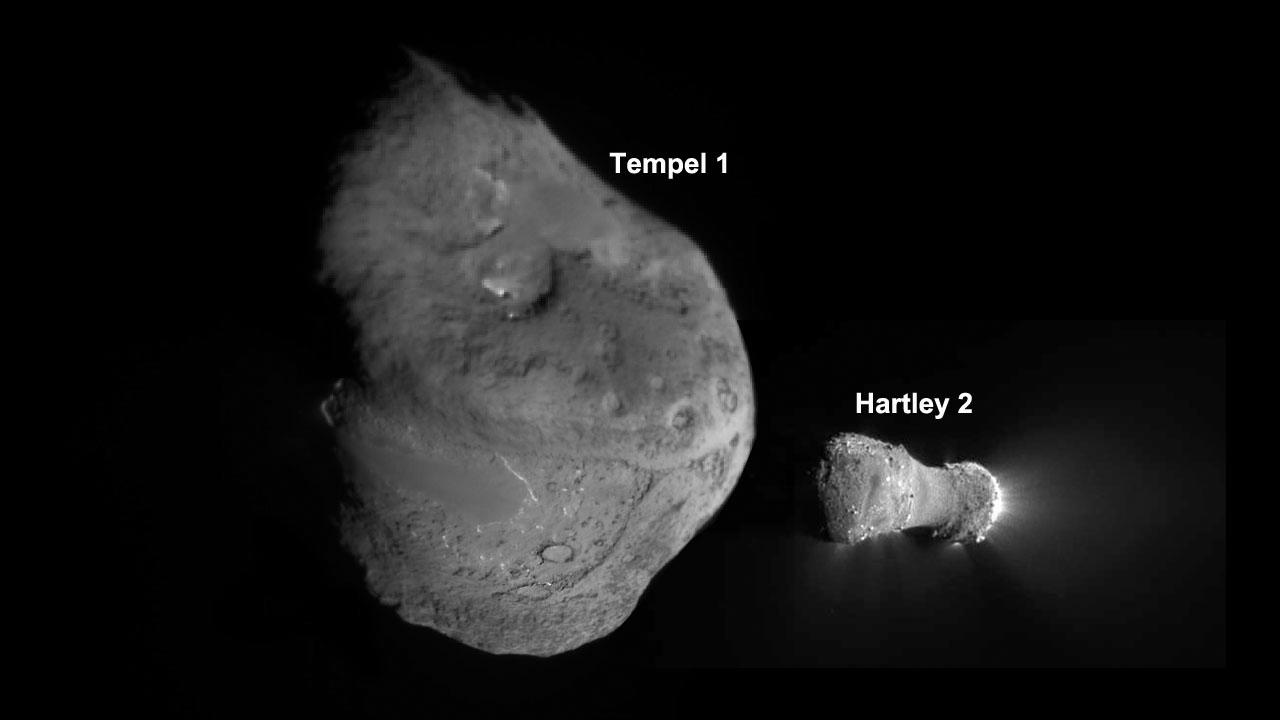
Comets Tempel 1 and Hartley 2

In November 2007 the JPL team targeted Deep Impact toward Comet Hartley 2. However, this would require an extra two years of travel for Deep Impact (including earth gravity assists in December 2007 and December 2008). On May 28, 2010, a burn of 11.3 seconds was conducted, to enable the June 27 Earth fly-by to be optimized for the transit to Hartley 2 and fly-by on November 4. The velocity change was 0.1 m/s (0.33 ft/s).

On November 4, 2010, the Deep Impact extended mission (EPOXI) returned images from comet Hartley 2. EPOXI came within 700 kilometers (430 mi) of the comet, returning detailed photographs of the "peanut" shaped cometary nucleus and several bright jets. The probe's medium-resolution instrument captured the photographs.

=== Comet Garradd (C/2009 P1) ===
Deep Impact observed Comet Garradd (C/2009 P1) from February 20 to April 8, 2012, using its Medium Resolution Instrument, through a variety of filters. The comet was 1.75–2.11 AU (262–316 million km) from the Sun and 1.87–1.30 AU (280–194 million km) from the spacecraft. It was found that the outgassing from the comet varies with a period of 10.4 hours, which is presumed to be due to the rotation of its nucleus. The dry ice content of the comet was measured and found to be about ten percent of its water ice content by number of molecules.

=== Possible mission to asteroid (163249) 2002 GT ===
At the end of 2011, Deep Impact was re-targeted towards asteroid (163249) 2002 GT which it would reach on January 4, 2020. At the time of re-targeting, whether or not a related science mission would be carried out in 2020 was yet to be determined, based on NASA's budget and the health of the probe. A 71-second engine burn on October 4, 2012, changed the probe's velocity by 2 m/s (6.6 ft/s) to keep the mission on track. Also, there was a 140-second burn on November 24, 2011. Distance of a flyby was estimated to be around 200 kilometers.

=== Comet C/2012 S1 (ISON) ===
In February 2013, Deep Impact observed Comet ISON. The comet remained observable until March 2013.

=== Contact lost and end of mission ===
On September 3, 2013, a mission update was posted to the EPOXI mission status website, stating "Communication with the spacecraft was lost some time between August 11 and August 14 ... The last communication was on August 8. ... the team on August 30 determined the cause of the problem. The team is now trying to determine how best to try to recover communication."

On September 10, 2013, a Deep Impact mission status report explained that mission controllers believed the computers on the spacecraft were continuously rebooting themselves and so were unable to issue any commands to the vehicle's thrusters. This was believed to make communication with the spacecraft more difficult because the orientation of the antennas was unknown. Additionally, the solar panels on the vehicle were unlikely to be positioned correctly for generating power.

On September 20, 2013, NASA abandoned further attempts to contact the spacecraft. According to chief scientist A'Hearn, the reason for the software malfunction was a Y2K-like problem. August 11, 2013, 00:38:49.6, was 2^{32} tenth-seconds (deciseconds) from January 1, 2000, suggesting that a system on the craft tracked time in one-tenth second increments since January 1, 2000, and stored it in an unsigned 32-bit integer, which then overflowed at this time, similar to the Year 2038 problem.

== See also ==
- Double Asteroid Redirection Test – Similar mission that impacted the asteroid Dimorphos to study the effect of impact on asteroid trajectory
- Lunar Crater Observation and Sensing Satellite (LCROSS) – Satellite that impacted Earth's Moon in 2009 in an attempt to eject water
- Hayabusa2
- Timeline of Solar System exploration
- List of minor planets and comets visited by spacecraft
- List of missions to minor planets
- List of missions to comets
