= EPOXI =

Extended mission of the Deep Impact space probe

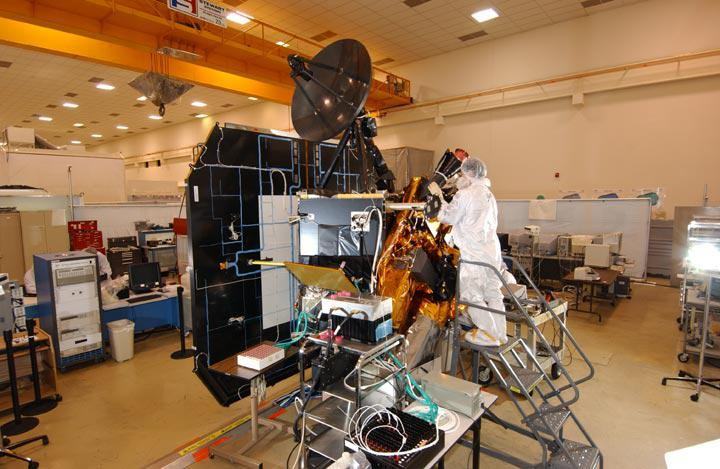
- The Deep Impact spacecraft at Ball Aerospace & Technologies in July 2004.
- Mission type: Flyby (85D/Boethin · 103P/Hartley · (163249) 2002 GT); Space observatory
- Operator: NASA
- COSPAR ID: 2005-001A
- Website: epoxi.umd.edu
- Mission duration: 8 years, 18 days

Spacecraft properties
- Spacecraft: Deep Impact
- Manufacturer: JPL · Ball Aerospace · University of Maryland
- Launch mass: 650 kg
- Power: 620.0 W

Start of mission
- Entered service: July 21, 2005 (21 years, 2 months and 7 days ago)

End of mission
- Last contact: August 8, 2013 (13 years, 1 month and 20 days ago)

Flyby of Hartley 2
- Closest approach: November 4, 2010 ~03:00 UTC (15 years, 10 months and 24 days ago)
- Distance: 694 kilometres (431 mi)
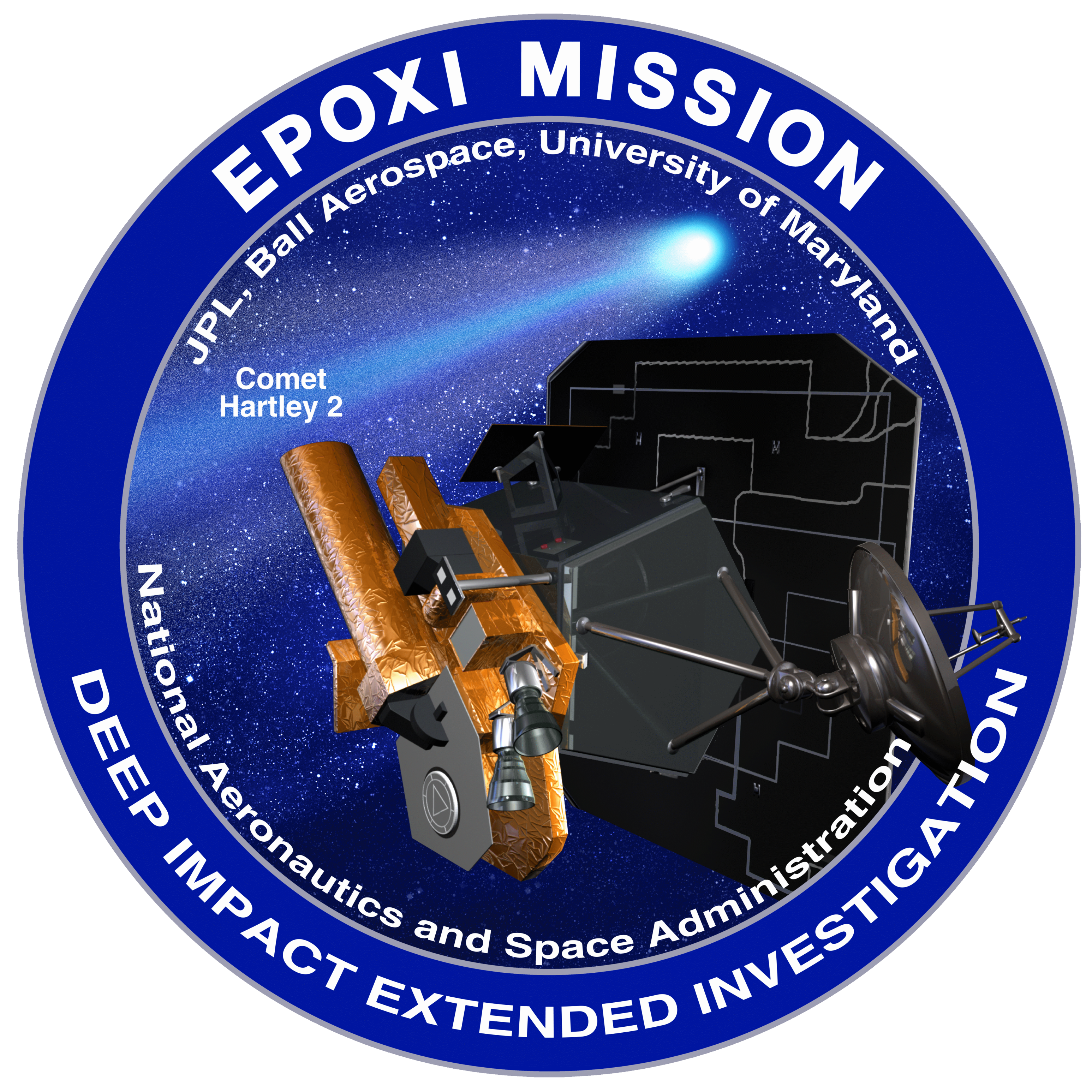
- Official insignia for the re-targeted DIXI mission to Hartley 2

EPOXI was a compilation of NASA Discovery program missions led by the University of Maryland and principal investigator Michael A'Hearn, with co-operation from the Jet Propulsion Laboratory and Ball Aerospace. EPOXI uses the Deep Impact spacecraft in a campaign consisting of two missions: the Deep Impact Extended Investigation (DIXI) and Extrasolar Planet Observation and Characterization (EPOCh). DIXI aimed to send the Deep Impact spacecraft on a flyby of another comet, after its primary mission was completed in July 2005, while EPOCh saw the spacecraft's photographic instruments as a space observatory, studying extrasolar planets.

DIXI successfully sent the Deep Impact spacecraft on a flyby of comet Hartley 2 on November 4, 2010, revealing a "hyperactive, small and feisty" comet, after three gravity assists from Earth in December 2007, December 2008 and June 2010. The DIXI mission was not without problems, however; the spacecraft had initially been targeted for a December 5, 2008 flyby of comet Boethin, though, the comet could not be located, and was later declared a lost comet, prompting mission planners to reorganize a flyby of an alternative target, Hartley 2. After its flyby of Hartley 2, the spacecraft was also set to make a close flyby of the Apollo asteroid (163249) 2002 GT in 2020. The mission ended after contact with the spacecraft was suddenly lost in August 2013 and attempts to re-establish contact in the following month had failed. Mission scientists theorized that a Y2K-like problem had plagued the spacecraft's software.

== Mission ==
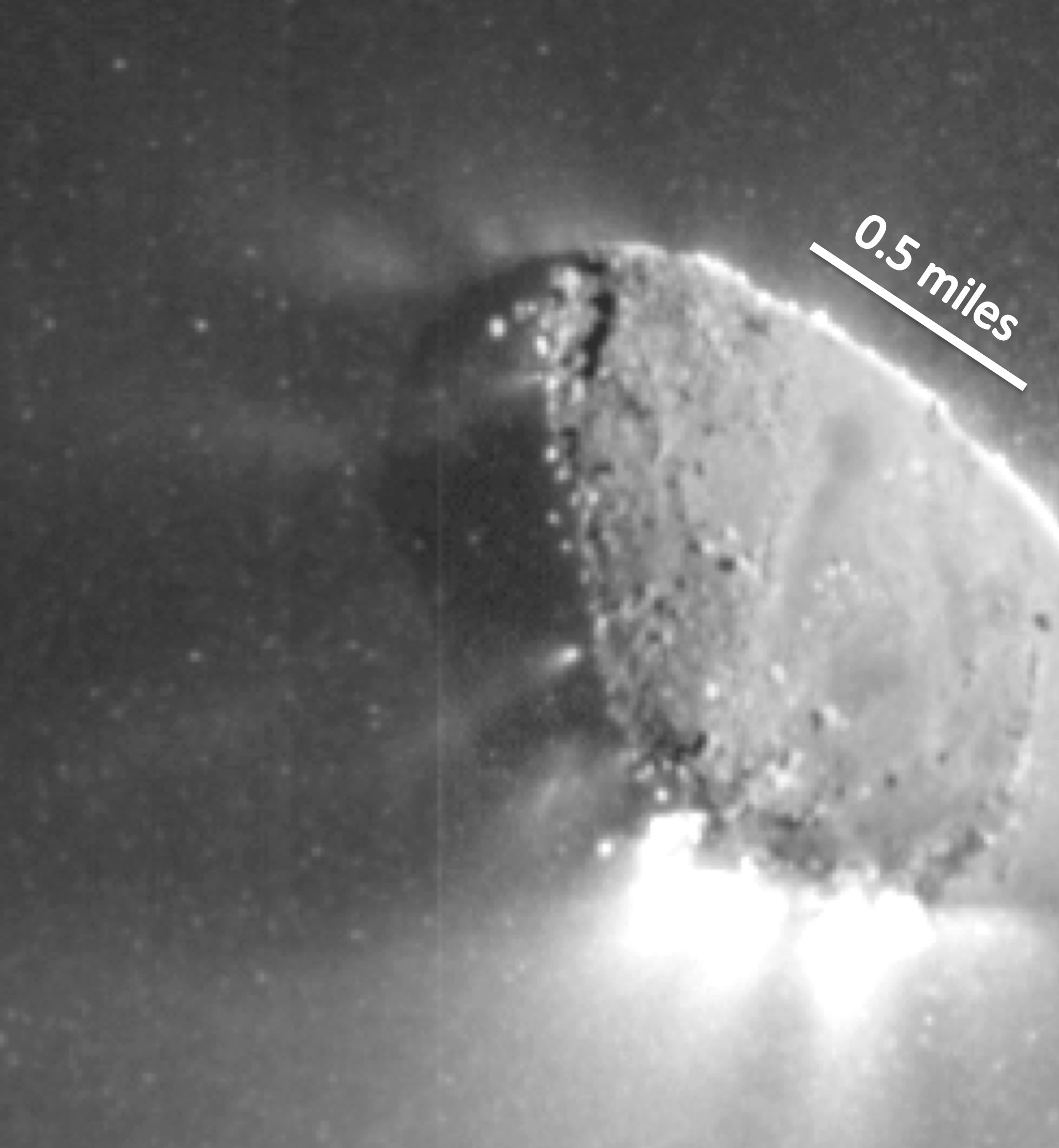
EPOXI mission observation of Hartley 2's jets

The Deep Impact mission was finished with the visit to comet Tempel 1. But the spacecraft still had plenty of maneuvering fuel left, so NASA approved a second mission, called EPOXI (Extrasolar Planet Observation and Deep Impact Extended Investigation), which included a visit to a second comet (DIXI component) as well as observations of extrasolar planets (EPOCh component).

=== Comet Boethin lost ===
On July 21, 2005, Deep Impact executed a trajectory correction maneuver that placed the spacecraft on course to fly past Earth on December 31, 2007. The maneuver allowed the spacecraft to use Earth's gravity to begin a new mission in a path towards another comet. In January 2008 Deep Impact began studying the stars with several known extrasolar planets in an attempt to find other such stars nearby. The larger of the spacecraft's two telescopes attempts to find the planets using the transit method.

The initial plan was for a December 5, 2008 flyby of Comet Boethin, with the spacecraft coming within 435 miles (700 km). The spacecraft did not carry a second impactor to collide with the comet and would observe the comet to compare it to various characteristics found on 9P/Tempel. A'Hearn, the Deep Impact team leader reflected on the upcoming project at that time: "We propose to direct the spacecraft for a flyby of Comet Boethin to investigate whether the results found at Comet Tempel 1 are unique or are also found on other comets." He explained that the mission would provide only about half of the information collected during the collision with Tempel 1 but at a fraction of the cost. (EPOXI's low mission cost of $40 million is achieved by reusing the existing Deep Impact spacecraft.) Deep Impact would use its spectrometer to study the comet's surface composition and its telescopes for viewing the surface features.

Animation of the Moon transiting the Earth on 28–29 May 2008 by EPOXI.

However, as the Earth gravity assist approached, astronomers were unable to locate Comet Boethin, which is too faint to be observed. Consequently, its orbit could not be calculated with sufficient precision to permit a flyby. Instead, the team decided to send Deep Impact to comet 103P/Hartley requiring an extra two years. NASA approved the additional funding required and retargeted the spacecraft. Mission controllers at the Jet Propulsion Laboratory began redirecting EPOXI on November 1, 2007. They commanded the spacecraft to perform a three-minute rocket burn that changed the spacecraft's velocity. EPOXI's new trajectory set the stage for three Earth flybys, the first on December 31, 2007. This placed the spacecraft into an orbital "holding pattern" so that it could encounter comet 103P/Hartley in 2010.

"It's exciting that we can send the Deep Impact spacecraft on a new mission that combines two totally independent science investigations, both of which can help us better understand how solar systems form and evolve," said in December 2007 Deep Impact leader and University of Maryland astronomer Michael A'Hearn who is principal investigator for both the overall EPOXI mission and its DIXI component.

In June 2009, EPOXI's spectrometer scanned the Moon on its way to Hartley, and discovered traces of "water or hydroxyl", confirming a Moon Mineralogy Mapper observation — a discovery announced in late September, 2009.

=== EPOCh ===
Before the 2008 flyby to re-orient for the comet 103P/Hartley encounter, the spacecraft used the High Resolution Instrument, the larger of its two telescopes, to perform photometric observations of previously discovered transiting extrasolar planets from January to August 2008. The goal of photometric observations is to measure the quantity of light, not necessarily resolve an image. An aberration in the primary mirror of the HRI allowed the HRI to spread the light from observations over more pixels without saturating the CCD, effectively obtaining better data. A total of 198,434 images were exposed. EPOCh's goals were to study the physical properties of giant planets and search for rings, moons and planets as small as three Earth masses. It also looked at Earth as though it were an extrasolar planet to provide data that could characterize Earth-type planets for future missions, and it imaged the Earth over 24 hours to capture the Moon passing in front on 2008-05-29.

Planetary systems observed
Star	Constellation	Distance (ly)	Planet
XO-2	Lynx	486	b
Gliese 436	Leo	33.48	b
HAT-P-4	Boötes	1010	b
GSC 03089-00929	Hercules	1300	TrES-3b
WASP-3	Lyra	727	b
GSC 03549-02811	Draco	718	TrES-2b
HAT-P-7	Cygnus	1044	b

=== Comet flyby ===
Animation of Deep Impact's trajectory from 12 January 2005 to 8 August 2013 Deep Impact 1 Tempel 1 Earth 103P/Hartley

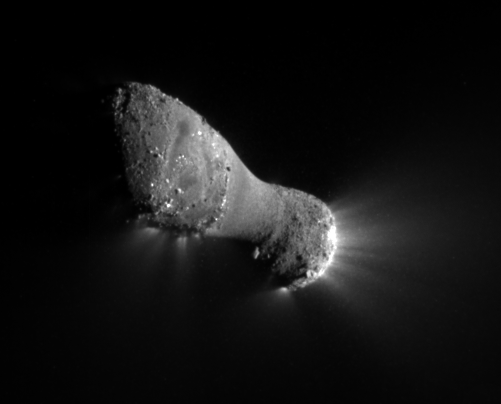
The nucleus of comet 103P/Hartley measuring approximately 2 kilometers in length and .4 kilometers at its most narrow portion or neck. Jets can be seen streaming out of the nucleus.

The spacecraft used Earth's gravity for the second gravity assist in December 2008 and made two distant flybys of Earth in June and December 2009. On May 30, 2010 it successfully fired its engines for an 11.3 second trajectory correction maneuver, for a velocity change (Δv) of 0.1 meters per second (0.22 mph), in preparation for the third Earth flyby on June 27. Observations of 103P/Hartley began on September 5 and ended November 25, 2010. For a diagram of the EPOXI solar orbits see here.

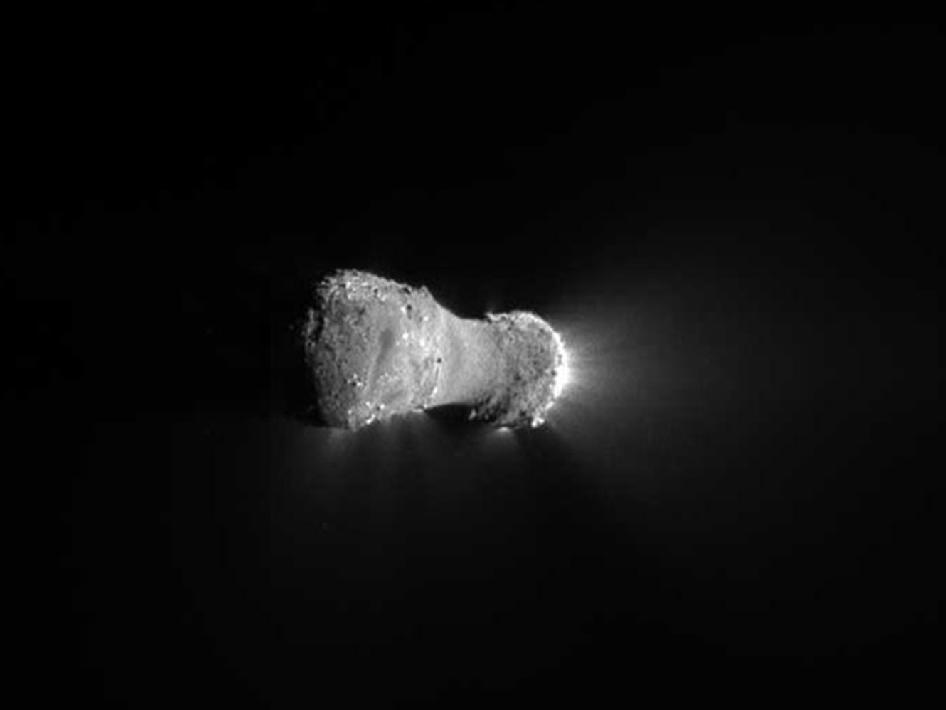
Another view of the comet, taken near closest approach.

The mission's closest approach to 103P/Hartley occurred at 10 am EDT on 4 November 2010, passing to within 694 kilometers (431 mi) of this small comet. The flyby speed was 12.3 km/s. The spacecraft employed the same suite of three science instruments—two telescopes and an infrared spectrometer—that the Deep Impact spacecraft used during its prime mission to guide an impactor into comet Tempel 1 in July 2005 and observe the results.

Early results of the observations show that the comet is powered by dry ice, not water vapor as was previously thought. The images were clear enough for scientists to link jets of dust and gas with specific surface features.

"When comet Boethin could not be located, we went to our backup, which is every bit as interesting but about two years farther down the road," said Tom Duxbury, EPOXI project manager at NASA's Jet Propulsion Laboratory in Pasadena, California. "Hartley 2 is scientifically just as interesting as comet Boethin because both have relatively small, active nuclei," said Michael A'Hearn, principal investigator for EPOXI at the University of Maryland, College Park.

=== Sundry opportunities ===
In November 2010, EPOXI was used to make some test-training deep sky observations, using the MRI camera that is optimised for cometary imagery. Images were made of the Dumbbell Nebula (M27), the Veil Nebula (NGC6960) and the Whirlpool Galaxy (M51a).
