= Michael A'Hearn =

American planetary scientist (1940-2017)

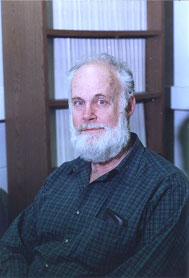
- Born: Michael Francis A'Hearn; November 17, 1940; Wilmington, Delaware, United States
- Died: May 29, 2017 (aged 76); Maryland, United States
- Education: Boston College; University of Wisconsin–Madison
- Awards: Gerard P. Kuiper Prize
- Scientific career
- Fields: planetary science
- Thesis: The Polarization of Venus (1966)
- Doctoral advisor: Arthur Code

Michael Francis A'Hearn (November 17, 1940 – May 29, 2017) was an American planetary scientist and astronomy professor at the University of Maryland College of Computer, Mathematical, and Natural Sciences. He was the principal investigator for NASA's Deep Impact/EPOXI mission, which performed the first impact of a comet.

== Biography ==
Michael Francis A'Hearn was born on November 17, 1940 in Wilmington, Delaware. He was the only child; his father worked for the Internal Revenue Service and his mother was a school teacher. He grew up in Braintree, Massachusetts. His family was of Irish ancestry.

He received his B.A. in physics at Boston College (1961); he received the cum laude degree in three years. He received a Ph.D. in astronomy at the University of Wisconsin–Madison (1966), with a thesis titled The Polarization of Venus, advised by Arthur Code. In 1966, he joined the Department of Physics and Astronomy at the University of Maryland; he spent there 50 years.

In the middle of 1970s, A'Hearn became interested in comets, and start to observe them using ground-based telescopes and then space-based telescopes, including Hubble. He was one of the first researches who used "narrowband filters for measuring comets' gas production rates and for mapping the structure of the gas and dust in their comae". Using this approach he developed "the first chemical classification system, based on carbon chain molecules". He aided in the development of systems for surveying abundances in comets as well as techniques for determining the sizes of cometary nuclei which uses optical and infrared measurements.

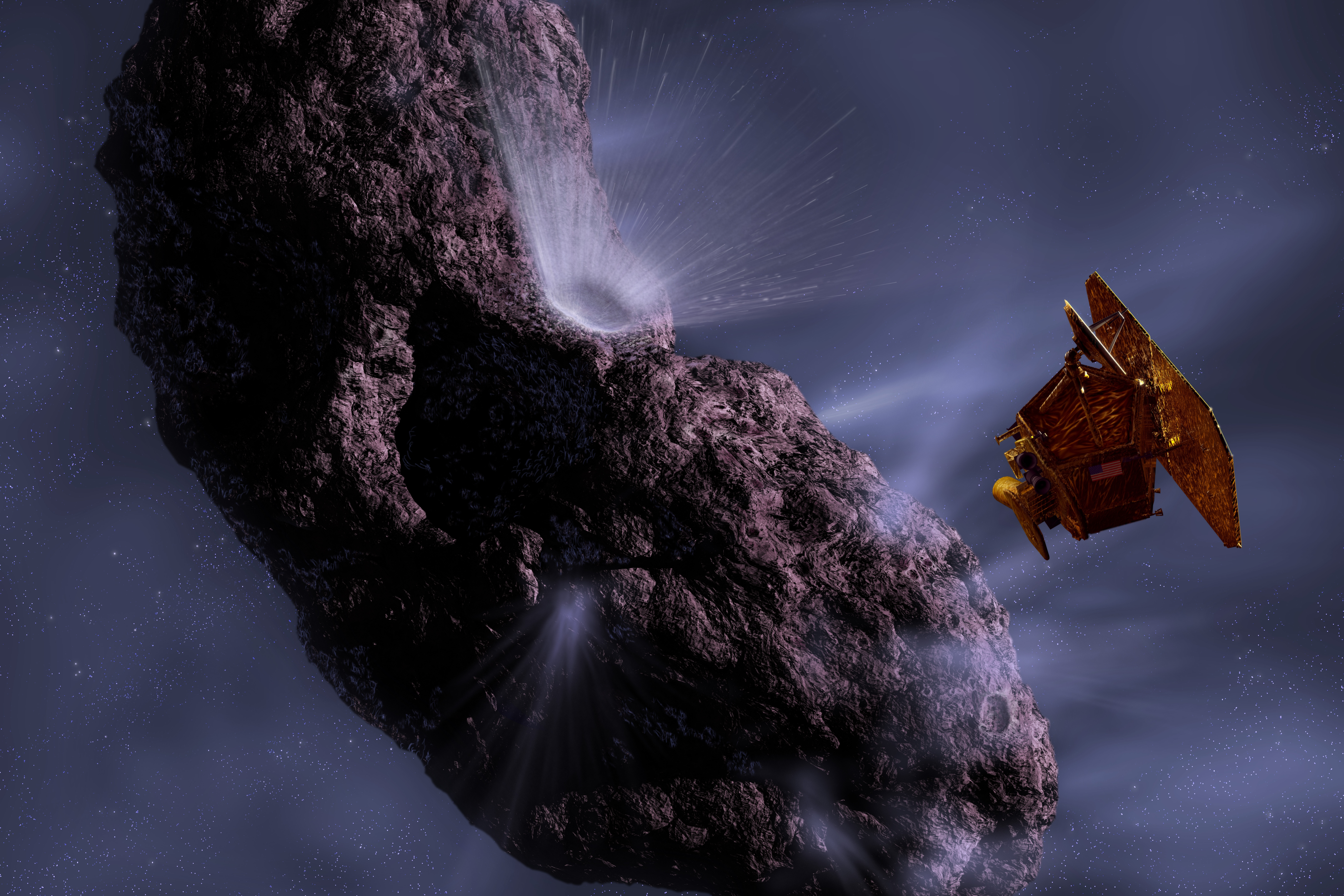
Artist's concept of the impact on Tempel 1

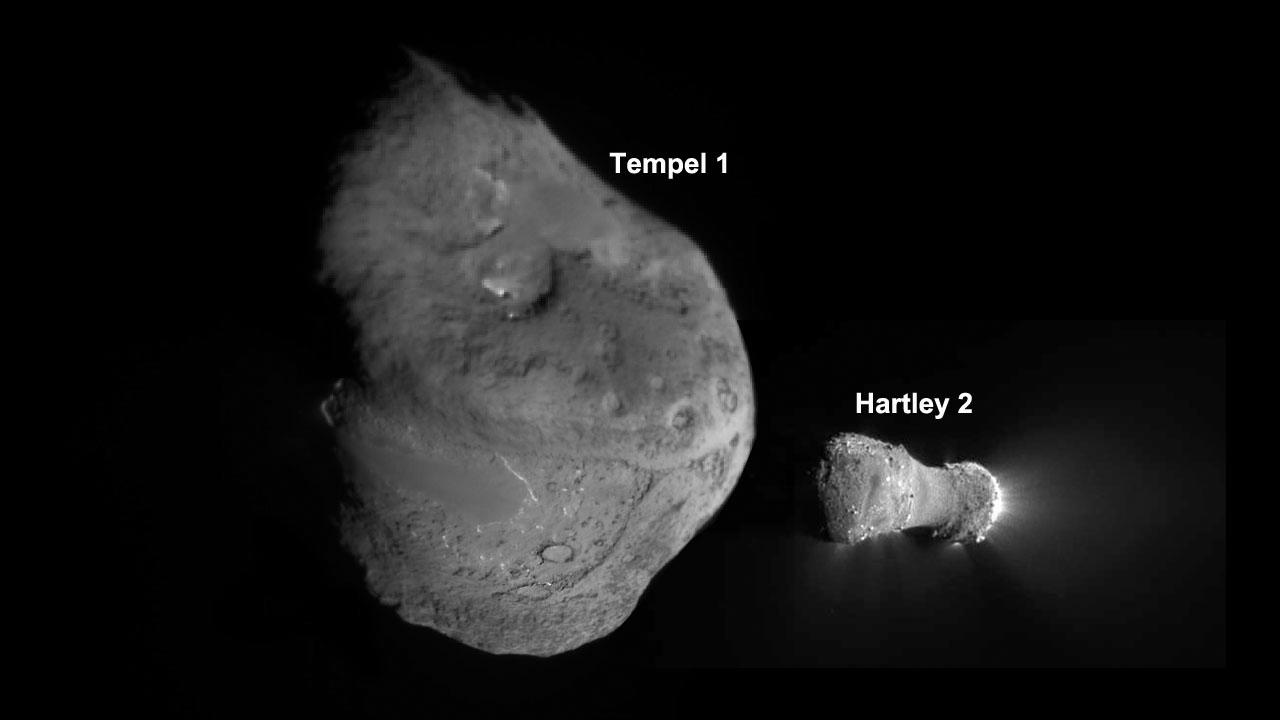
Comets Tempel 1 and Hartley 2, observed by Deep Impact in 2005 and 2010

He was the principal investigator for the NASA Deep Impact mission to comet Tempel 1, and its extended phase called EPOXI. Deep Impact was first proposed to NASA in 1996, with Michael J. Belton as a PI and A'Hearn as a deputy. Belton left the project, leaving A'Hearn to lead it in 1998 proposal. It was "one of the first active interplanetary experiments" that included an impactor. During the EPOXI phase, the spacecraft was sent to observe comet Hartley 2. A'Hearn was also a co-investigator on Stardust-NExT mission that revisited the Tempel 1 comet after the Deep Impact's impact, and a co-i of two instruments on ESA's Rosetta mission to 67P/Churyumov-Gerasimenko comet: the OSIRIS camera and Alice spectrograph.

In 1984, A'Hearn initiated the International Halley Watch (IHW), "a worldwide undertaking designed to collect and preserve observations of comet Halley during its 1986 return". He then organized an observation campaign of the Comet Shoemaker-Levy 9 collision with Jupiter in 1994. He later became the PI of the Small Bodies Node (SBN) of NASA's Planetary Data System. He served as a head of the AAS Publications Board in 2005-2008. He was also a president of the solar-system division of the International Astronomical Union.

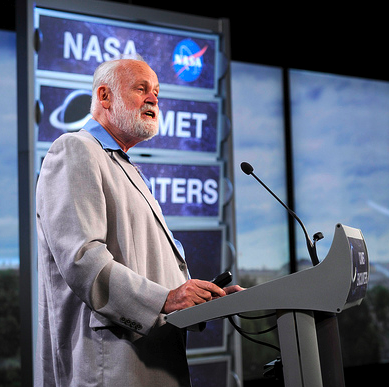
A'Hearn during Deep Impact/EPOXI press conference

A'Hearn's research showed "that comets are consolidated, primitive, loosely packed icy mud balls from the dawn of the solar system and building blocks of the planets". According to astronomer Carey M. Lisse, A'Hearn's best-known contributions are "helping to discover the presence of water ice and diatomic sulfur emission in cometary comae, introducing the Afρ geometry-independent measure of coma dust density, determining the rotation rates of comets by observing their cyanogen jets, and resolving the dark, low-albedo nature of cometary nuclei."

A'Hearn supervised 18 PhD students. According to Lisse, "By many counts, he trained, collaborated with, and employed more than 80% of the pre-Rosetta generation of cometary astronomers".

== Personal life ==
In 1963, A'Hearn married his fellow student, Maxine Ramold; they had three sons. A'Hearn was an avid sailor.

He died from pancreatic cancer on May 29, 2017, at the age of 76.

== Awards and recognition ==
- fellow of the American Association for the Advancement of Science (1989)
- NASA Exceptional Scientific Achievement Medal (2006, 2012)
- Gerard P. Kuiper Prize (2008)
- Gauß-Professur (2014)
- NASA Exceptional Public Service Medal (2017); awarded posthumously for "fundamental work on comets and small bodies of the solar system, leadership in space missions, and ensuring public access to data from NASA missions and related projects"

In June 1986, the main-belt asteroid 3192 A'Hearn, discovered by American astronomer Edward Bowell at Lowell's Anderson Mesa Station in Flagstaff, Arizona, was named after him in honor of his contributions to cometary science.

== Selected publications ==
A'Hearn authored over a hundred papers, including more than 30 on the Comet Churyumov-Gerasimenko.

- A'Hearn, M. F.; Schleicher, D. G.; Millis, R. L.; Feldman, P. D.; Thompson, D. T. (1984). "Comet Bowell 1980b". Astronomical Journal. 89: 579–591.
- A'Hearn, Michael F.; Hoban, Susan; Birch, Peter V.; Bowers, Craig; Martin, Ralph; Klinglesmith, Daniel A. (December 1986). "Cyanogen jets in comet Halley". Nature. 324 (6098): 649–651. doi:10.1038/324649a0. ISSN 1476-4687.
- A'Hearn, Michael F.; Millis, Robert C. [in French]; Schleicher, David G.; Osip, David J.; Birch, Peter V. (1 December 1995). "The Ensemble Properties of Comets: Results from Narrowband Photometry of 85 Comets, 1976-1992". Icarus. 118 (2): 223–270. doi:10.1006/icar.1995.1190. ISSN 0019-1035.
- A'Hearn, M. F.; Belton, M. J. S.; Delamere, W. A.; et al. (14 October 2005). "Deep Impact: Excavating Comet Tempel 1". Science. 310 (5746): 258–264. doi:10.1126/science.1118923.
- Keller, H. U.; et al. (1 February 2007). "OSIRIS – The Scientific Camera System Onboard Rosetta". Space Science Reviews. 128 (1): 433–506. doi:10.1007/s11214-006-9128-4. hdl:11577/2446970. ISSN 1572-9672.
- Sunshine, Jessica M.; Farnham, Tony L.; Feaga, Lori M.; Groussin, Olivier; Merlin, Frédéric; Milliken, Ralph E.; A'Hearn, Michael F. (23 October 2009). "Temporal and Spatial Variability of Lunar Hydration As Observed by the Deep Impact Spacecraft". Science. 326 (5952): 565–568. doi:10.1126/science.1179788.
- Archinal, B. A.; A'Hearn, M. F.; Bowell, E.; et al. (1 February 2011). "Report of the IAU Working Group on Cartographic Coordinates and Rotational Elements: 2009". Celestial Mechanics and Dynamical Astronomy. 109 (2): 101–135. doi:10.1007/s10569-010-9320-4. ISSN 1572-9478.
- A'Hearn, Michael F.; Belton, Michael J. S.; Delamere, W. Alan; et al. (17 June 2011). "EPOXI at Comet Hartley 2". Science. 332 (6036): 1396–1400. doi:10.1126/science.1204054.
- Sierks, Holger; et al. (23 January 2015). "On the nucleus structure and activity of comet 67P/Churyumov-Gerasimenko". Science. 347 (6220) aaa1044. doi:10.1126/science.aaa1044.
