= Filipino names in space =

Overview of space objects named after Filipino people, mythology and places

This is a list of space objects and features which were named after Filipino people, mythology and places.

== Asteroids ==
As of July 2026, there are 24 asteroids named after Filipino people, places and mythological creatures, all of which (except Anagolay and Duende) are located in the main asteroid belt between Mars and Jupiter.

Near-Earth obj.	MBA (inner)	MBA (outer)	Centaur
Mars-crosser	MBA (middle)	Jupiter trojan	Trans-Neptunian obj.
Unclassified

back to top

Named minor planet	Provisional	This minor planet was named for...	Ref · Catalog
3757 Anagolay	1982 XB	Anagolay, the goddess of lost things in Tagalog mythology	· 3757
4866 Badillo	1988 VB_{3}	Victor L. Badillo (1930–2014), Filipino Jesuit astronomer, former director of the Manila Observatory, president of the Philippine Astronomical Society (1972–1990), and honorary director of the Astronomical League of the Philippines	· 4866
5749 Urduja	1991 FV	Urduja, a legendary 14th century princess from the land of Tawalisi, which believed to be located in what is now the present-day Pangasinan	· 5749
6282 Edwelda	1980 TS_{4}	Edwin Aguirre (born 1955) and Imelda Joson, Filipino associate editor and photo editor, respectively, at Sky & Telescope magazine	· 6282
6636 Kintanar	1988 RK_{8}	Roman Kintanar (1929–2007), Filipino meteorologist and former director of the Philippine Atmospheric, Geophysical and Astronomical Services Administration (PAGASA)	· 6636
7026 Gabrielasilang	1993 QB_{1}	Gabriela Silang (1731–1763) is a Filipino revolutionary leader that led the Ilocos revolt against Spain in 1763 after the assassination of her husband, Diego, in the same year	· 7026
7431 Jettaguilar	1993 FN_{41}	Jose A. "Jett" Aguilar (born 1961) is a Filipino neurosurgeon who has saved over 1,000 children in the Philippines by volunteering his time and surgical expertise to treat their congenital malformations and brain tumors. He is also an amateur astronomer and serves as vice president of the Astronomical League of the Philippines	· 7431
11697 Estrella	1998 FX_{98}	Allan Noriel Estrella (born 1984), an ISEF awardee in 2002 for his microbiology project. He attends the Integrated Developmental School MSU-IIT, Iligan, Lanao Del Norte	· 11697
12088 Macalintal	1998 HZ_{31}	Jeric V. Macalintal (born 1986), an ISEF awardee in 2002 for his microbiology project. He attends the Integrated Developmental School MSU-IIT, Iligan, Lanao Del Norte	· 12088
12522 Rara	1998 HL_{99}	Prem Vilas Fortran M. Rara, (born 1985) is an ISEF awardee in 2002 for his microbiology project. He attends the Integrated Developmental School MSU-IIT, Iligan, Lanao Del Norte	· 12522
13241 Biyo	1998 KM_{41}	Josette Biyo (born 1958), a Filipino teacher who received the Intel International Excellence in Teaching Award in 2002. She taught at the Philippine Science High School, (Western Visayas), Iloilo City	· 13241
13513 Manila	1990 EL_{2}	Manila, Philippines	· 13513
20504 Magbanua	1999 RH_{15}	Mark Jesus M. Magbanua (born 1971) is a Filipino-American research scientist at the University of California, San Francisco, where he pioneers circulating tumor cell detection. Mark contributes to the identification of comets and active asteroids via the Ruben Comet Catchers project, including observing with the Vatican Advanced Technology Telescope.	· 20504
28439 Miguelreyes	2000 AM_{30}	Miguel Arnold S. Reyes (born 1995) is an ISEF awardee in 2011 for his materials and bioengineering project. He attends the Philippine Science High School (Main), Quezon City	· 28439
30100 Christophergo	2000 EL_{157}	Christopher Go (born 1970), a Filipino astrophotographer who has taken superb images of the Moon and the planets since 1990. He is from Cebu City	· 30100
34044 Obafial	2000 OZ_{31}	Nadine Antonette Obafial (born 2000) is an ISEF awardee in 2017 for her plant sciences team project. She attends the Davao City National High School, Davao City	· 34044
34047 Gloria	2000 OJ_{35}	Rubeliene Chezka F. Gloria (born 2001) is an ISEF awardee in 2017 for her plant sciences team project. She attends the Davao City National High School, Davao City	· 34047
34049 Myrelleangela	2000 ON_{36}	Myrelle Angela T. Colas (born 2001) is an ISEF awardee in 2017 for her plant sciences team project. She attends the Davao City National High School, Davao City	· 34049
34053 Carlquines	2000 OF_{38}	Carl Joshua T. Quines (born 2000) is an ISEF awardee in 2017 for his math team project. He attends the Valenzuela City School of Mathematics and Science, Valenzuela City	· 34053
34522 Cadores	2000 SH_{192}	Keith Russel P. Cadores (born 1999) is an ISEF awardee in 2018 for his energy team project. He attended the Camarines Sur National High School, Naga City, Camarines Sur	· 34522
34523 Manzanero	2000 SU_{194}	Joscel Kent P. Manzanero (born 1999) is an ISEF awardee in 2018 for his energy team project. He attended the Camarines Sur National High School, Naga City, Camarines Sur	· 34523
34524 Eugenerivera	2000 SZ_{195}	Eugene R. Rivera (born 1999) is an ISEF awardee in 2018 for his energy team project. He attended the Camarines Sur National High School, Naga City, Camarines Sur	· 34524
134346 Pinatubo	1991 PT_{2}	Mount Pinatubo, Luzon	· 134346
367943 Duende	2012 DA_{14}	The Duende, a race of fairy or goblin-like mythological creatures from Iberian, Latin American and Filipino folklore.	· 367943

== Comets ==
As of March 2024, there is only one known comet discovered by Filipino astronomers.

Comet designation	Namesake(s)	Discovery (year)	Ref
85D/Boethin	Leo Boethin (1912–1998)	1975	

== Geological features ==
As of February 2024, there are 22 geological features with Filipino names across 7 celestial objects in the Solar System (3 planets, 2 of Saturn's moons, 1 dwarf planet and 1 asteroid).

=== Mercury ===
Feature	Type	Coordinates	Named after	Ref
Balagtas	Crater	22.56°S 13.9°W	Francisco Balagtas (1788–1862)	
Bitin	Facula	51.55°S 28.45°E	Bitin (Cebuano meaning "snake")	
Rizal	Crater	82.48°N 146.98°W	Jose Rizal (1861–1896)	

=== Venus ===
Feature	Type	Coordinates	Named after	Ref
Darago	Fluctus	11.5°S 313.5°E	Darago, the goddess of war from Bagobo mythology	
Escoda	Crater	18.2°N 149.5°E	Josefa Llanes Escoda (1898–1945)	
Umaga	Valles	49.0°S 152.0°E	Umaga (Tagalog meaning "morning", formerly attributed to Venus itself)	

=== Mars ===
Feature	Type	Coordinates	Named after	Ref
Bacolor	Crater	33.0°N 241.4°W	Bacolor, Pampanga	
Camiling	Crater	0.8°S 241.4°W	Camiling, Tarlac	
Daet	Crater	7.4°S 41.8°W	Daet, Camarines Norte	
Naic	Crater	24.7°N 252.6°W	Naic, Cavite	
Solano	Crater	27.0°S 251.2°W	Solano, Nueva Vizcaya	
Taytay	Crater	7.37°N 19.65°W	Taytay, Palawan	

=== 1 Ceres ===
Feature	Type	Coordinates	Named after	Ref
Binayo	Crater	86.40°N 145.20°E	Binayo, a Mangyan female spirit, caretaker of rice spirits	
Ikapati	Crater	33.84°N 45.61°E	Ikapati (Lakapati), the goddess of agriculture in Tagalog mythology	
Oltagon	Crater	25.95°S 37.96°E	Oltagon, the goddess of agriculture in Ifugao mythology	

=== 101955 Bennu ===
Feature	Type	Coordinates	Named after	Ref
Amihan	Saxum	17.96°S 256.51°E	Amihan, a primordial bird deity from Tagalog mythology	
Minokawa	Crater	8.79°S 90.9°W	Minokawa, a giant dragon-like bird in Bagobo mythology	

=== Io ===
Feature	Type	Coordinates	Named after	Ref
Kanlaon	Patera	31.04S 337.58°W	Kan-Laon, the supreme sky goddess of creation, agriculture, and justice from Visayan mythology who resided at the peak of Kanlaon volcano.	

=== Rhea ===
Feature	Type	Coordinates	Named after	Ref
Lumawig	Crater	58.0°N 136.5°E	Lumawig, the supreme deity who created humanity from Igorot mythology	
Pulag	Chasma	33.0°S 266.5°E	Mount Pulag, Luzon	

=== Titan ===
Feature	Type	Coordinates	Named after	Ref
Kayangan	Lacus	86.30°S 202.17°E	Kayangan Lake, Palawan	
Lanao	Lacus	71.00°N 217.70°E	Lake Lanao, Mindanao	
Mindanao	Facula	6.60°S 174.20°E	Mindanao island	

== Stars and exoplanets ==
As of February 2024, only WASP-34 and its planet (b) have IAU-approved Filipino formal names, which they received during the second NameExoWorlds campaign in 2019.

Star	Planet	Distance	Named after
Amansinaya (WASP-34)	Haik (WASP-34b)	432 ly	Amansinaya and Haik, the two gods of the sea in Tagalog mythology
