= 103P/Hartley =

Jupiter-family comet

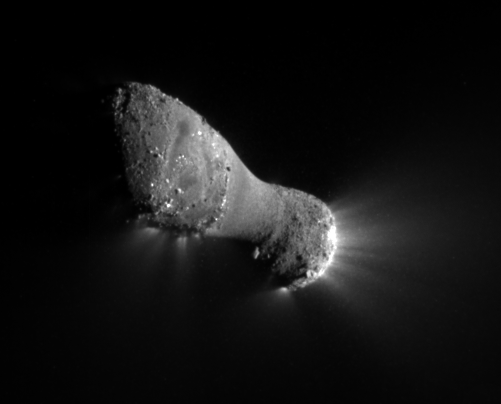
- The nucleus of Comet Hartley 2 photographed by the Deep Impact (EPOXI) mission on November 2010

Discovery
- Discovered by: Malcolm Hartley
- Discovery site: Siding Spring, Australia
- Discovery date: 15 March 1986

Designations
- MPC designation: P/1986 E2, P/1991 N1
- Pronunciation: /ˈhɑːrtli/
- Alternative designations: Hartley 2; 1985 V, 1991 XV; 1986c, 1991t

Orbital characteristics
- Epoch: 5 May 2025 (JD 2460800.5)
- Observation arc: 20.44 years
- Number of observations: 8,857
- Aphelion: 5.89 AU
- Perihelion: 1.06 AU
- Semi-major axis: 3.48 AU
- Eccentricity: 0.694
- Orbital period: 6.48 years
- Inclination: 13.608°
- Longitude of ascending node: 219.76°
- Argument of periapsis: 181.33°
- Mean anomaly: 86.789°
- Last perihelion: 12 October 2023
- Next perihelion: 5 April 2030
- T_{Jupiter}: 2.642
- Earth MOID: 0.072 AU
- Jupiter MOID: 0.277 AU

Physical characteristics
- Mean radius: 0.58±0.018 km
- Mass: 300 Mt (3.0×10^{11} kg; 6.6×10^{11} lb)
- Mean density: 200–400 kg/m^{3}
- Synodic rotation period: 18.1 hours
- Geometric albedo: 0.028
- Comet total magnitude (M1): 16.0

Comet Hartley 2, designated 103P/Hartley by the Minor Planet Center, is a small periodic comet with an orbital period of 6.48 years. It was discovered by Malcolm Hartley in 1986 at the Schmidt Telescope Unit, Siding Spring Observatory, Australia. Its diameter is estimated to be 1.2–1.6 km (0.75–0.99 mi)

Hartley 2 was the target of a flyby of the Deep Impact spacecraft, as part of the EPOXI mission, on 4 November 2010, which was able to approach within 700 km (430 mi) of Hartley 2 as part of its extended mission. As of November 2010 Hartley 2 is the smallest comet which has been visited. It is the fifth comet visited by spacecraft, and the second comet visited by the Deep Impact spacecraft, which first visited comet Tempel 1 on 4 July 2005.

== Discovery and orbit ==
Comet Hartley 2 is a small Jupiter-family comet having an orbital period of 6.46 years. It was discovered by Malcolm Hartley in 1986 at the Schmidt Telescope Unit, Siding Spring Observatory, Australia. It has the perihelion near the Earth's orbit at 1.05 AU (157 million km) from the Sun.

=== 2010 Earth approach ===
The comet passed within 0.12 AU (18 million km) of Earth on 20 October 2010, only eight days before coming to perihelion on 28 October 2010. From northern latitudes, during early November 2010, the comet was visible around midnight without interference from the Moon. The comet reached an apparent magnitude of about 5 and became dimly visible by naked eye.

=== 2023 Earth approach ===
On 26 September 2023 the comet passed 57268126±144 km from Earth. It came to perihelion on 12 October 2023 and brightened to about magnitude 8.

103P/Hartley Closest Earth Approach on 2023-Sep-26 05:44 UT
Date & time of closest approach	Earth distance (AU)	Sun distance (AU)	Velocity wrt Earth (km/s)	Velocity wrt Sun (km/s)	Uncertainty region (3-sigma)	Reference
2023-09-26 05:28 ± <1 min	0.3828 AU (57.27 million km)	1.088 AU (162.8 million km)	18.3	37.1	± 144 km	Horizons

Despite its current close passage by Earth's orbit, the comet is not yet a known source of meteor showers. However, that could change. Dust trails from the recent returns of 103P/Hartley 2 move in and out of Earth's orbit, and the 1979-dust trail is expected to hit in 2062 and 2068.

== Characteristics ==
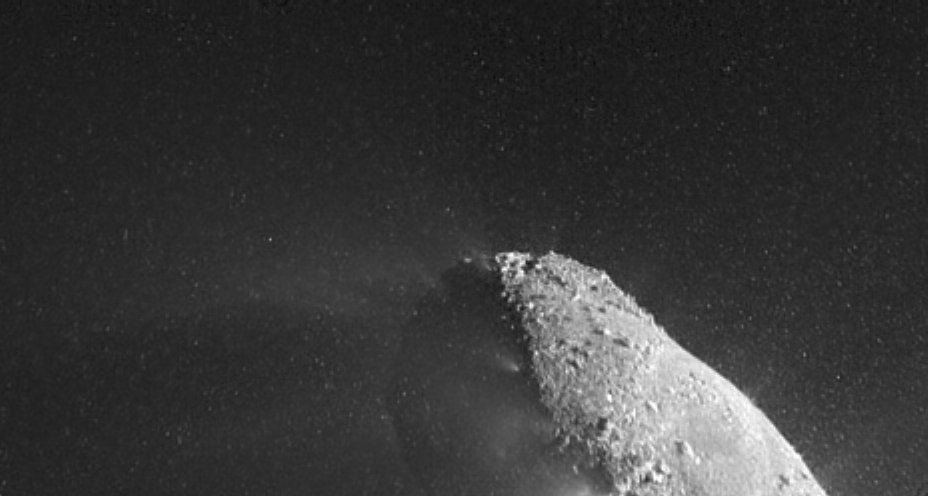
Comet 103P/Hartley closeup, from EPOXI.

Observation by the Spitzer Space Telescope in August 2008 showed the comet nucleus to have a radius of 0.57 ± 0.08 km (0.354 ± 0.050 mi) and a low albedo of 0.028. The mass of the comet is estimated to be about 300 megatonnes (3.0×10^{11} kg). Barring a catastrophic breakup or major splitting event, the comet should be able to survive up to another 100 apparitions (~700 years) at its current rate of mass loss.

Radar observations by the Arecibo Observatory during the comet's 2010 apparition revealed that the nucleus is highly elongated and rotates over an 18-hour period. The project manager of the EPOXI mission described its shape as "a cross between a bowling pin and a pickle".

In 2011 Herschel Space Observatory detected the signature of vaporized water in the comet's coma. Hartley 2 contains half as much heavy water as other comets analyzed before, with the same ratio between heavy water and regular water as found in Earth's oceans.

For many years, it was known that few comets produced more water vapor than it should by the redirection of nucleus of water ice. The flyby of Hartley 2 showed that many of the icy grains in the coma are driven out by the outgassing of carbon dioxide. It is believed that this is the source of much of the water coming from the comet.

Observations of Hartley 2 showed the importance of carbon-monoxide ice to carbon-dioxide ice in comets. After a reexamination, it was found that the abundances of carbon-monoxide ice and carbon dioxide ice show that short-period comets formed under warmer conditions, than the longer period comets. This shows that the short-period comets formed closer to the Sun, than the long-term comets. This discovery goes well with the measurements of Heavy Water in Hartley 2.

== Deep Impact flyby ==
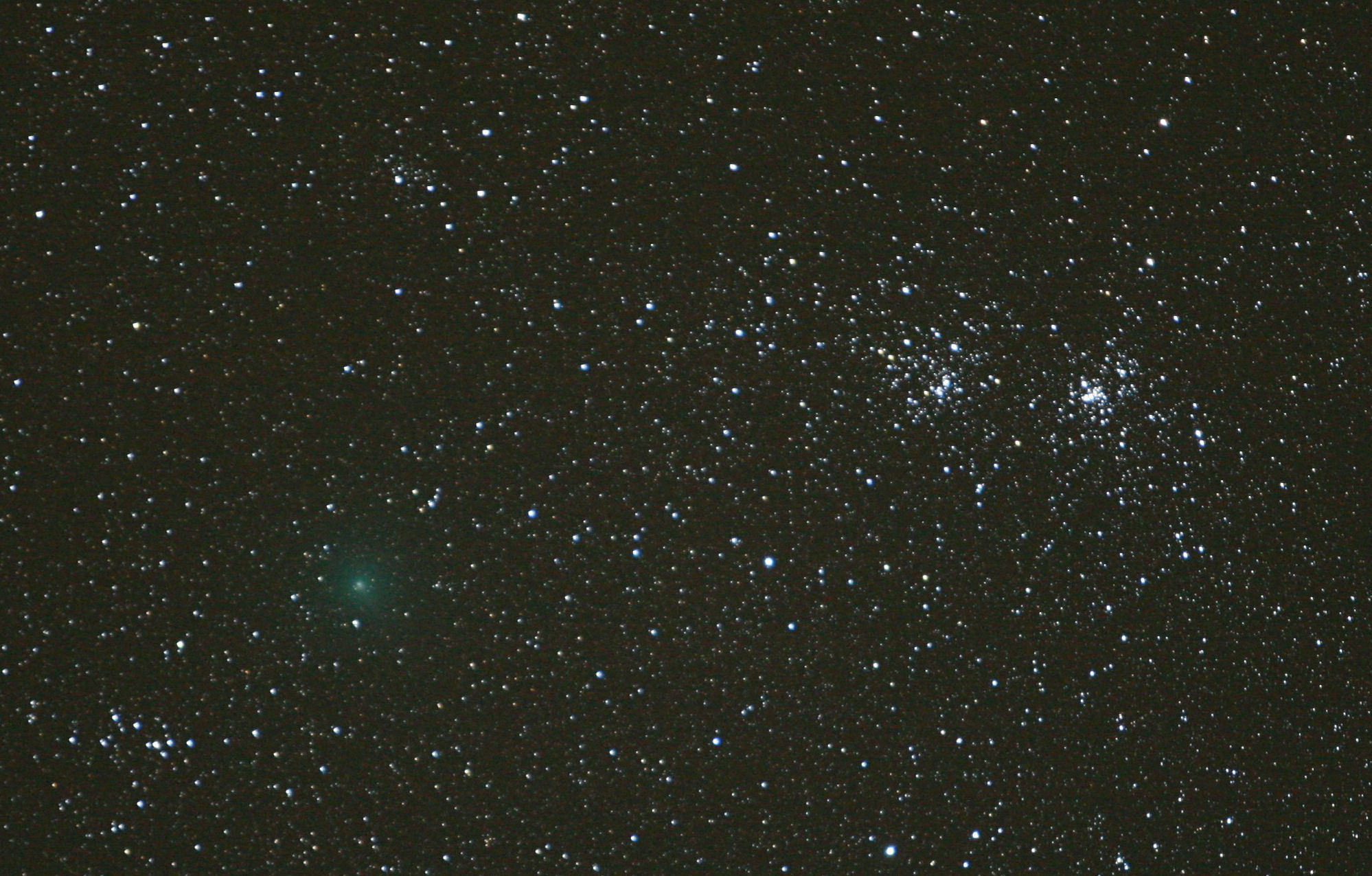
103P with Double Cluster in Perseus 9 October 2010.

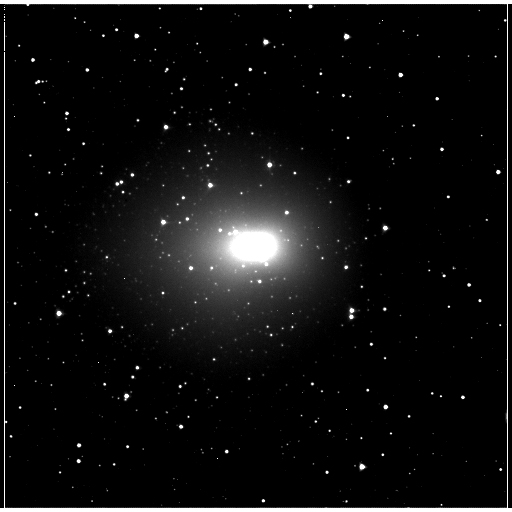
Comet Hartley 2 on 2 November 2010 from a distance of 2.3 million kilometers, as photographed by the Deep Impact spacecraft.

The Deep Impact spacecraft, which had previously photographed Comet Tempel 1, was reused by NASA to study Hartley 2. The initial plan was for a flyby of Comet Boethin. However, Boethin had not been observed since 1986, and its orbit could not be calculated with sufficient precision to permit a flyby, so NASA re-targeted the spacecraft toward Hartley 2 instead. The spacecraft came within 700 km (430 mi) while moving at 44,300 km/h (27,500 mph) on 4 November 2010. The data from the flyby were transmitted back to Earth through NASA's Deep Space Network.

The flyby was able to show that the comet is 2.25 km (1.40 mi) long, and "peanut shaped". Some jets of material are being ejected from the dark side of the comet, rather than the sunlit side. Scientists involved in the EPOXI mission describe the comet as being unusually active, with mission scientist Don Yeomans stating that "It's hyperactive, small and feisty."

NASA's scientists reported that the rays coming off the rough ends consist of hundreds of tons of fluffy ice and dust chunks – the largest particles are of golf ball to basketball-size – and they are ejected by jets of carbon dioxide. The scientists also said that it was the first time that comet activity powered by sublimation of frozen carbon dioxide had been observed as the comet neared the Sun; the CO_{2} ice within the comet must be primordial, dating from the beginnings of the Solar System.

=== Results ===
Animation of Deep Impact's trajectory from 12 January 2005 to 8 August 2013 Deep Impact 1 Tempel 1 Earth 103P/Hartley

The EPOXI mission flyby showed that the material being ejected from the comet is primarily composed of CO_{2} gas. Michael A'Hearn, the science team leader for the EPOXI mission, stated:

"Early observations of the comet show that, for the first time, we may be able to connect activity to individual features on the nucleus".

Flyby of Comet Hartley 2 on 4 Nov. 2010 by Deep Impact (EPOXI)

A University of Maryland-led study published in 17 June issue of the journal Science described an analysis of the mission. Key findings from the mission include: (1) the smooth, relatively inactive waist of the peanut shaped comet has probably been re-deposited; (2) Hartley 2 spins around one axis, but also tumbles around a different axis; and (3) on its larger, rougher ends, the comet's surface contains glittering, blocky objects that are about 165 ft (50 m) high and 260 ft (79 m) wide (as big as a 16-story building). Moreover, these objects appear to be two to three times more reflective than the surface average.

"Hartley 2 is a hyperactive little comet, spewing out more water than other comets its size", said University of Maryland Astronomer Michael A'Hearn, who is lead author on the Science paper and principal investigator for the EPOXI and Deep Impact missions. "When warmed by the Sun, dry ice [frozen carbon dioxide] deep in the comet's body turns to gas jetting off the comet and dragging water ice with it."

It is now believed that some of the dust, icy chunks, and other material coming off the ends of the comet are moving slowly enough to be captured by even the weak gravity of the comet, this material then falls back into the lowest point of the comet, which is the middle.

== See also ==
- List of minor planets and comets visited by spacecraft
  - 9P/Tempel
  - 81P/Wild

Numbered comets
Previous; 102P/Shoemaker	103P/Hartley	Next; 104P/Kowal
