= Arthur Code =

Arthur D. Code
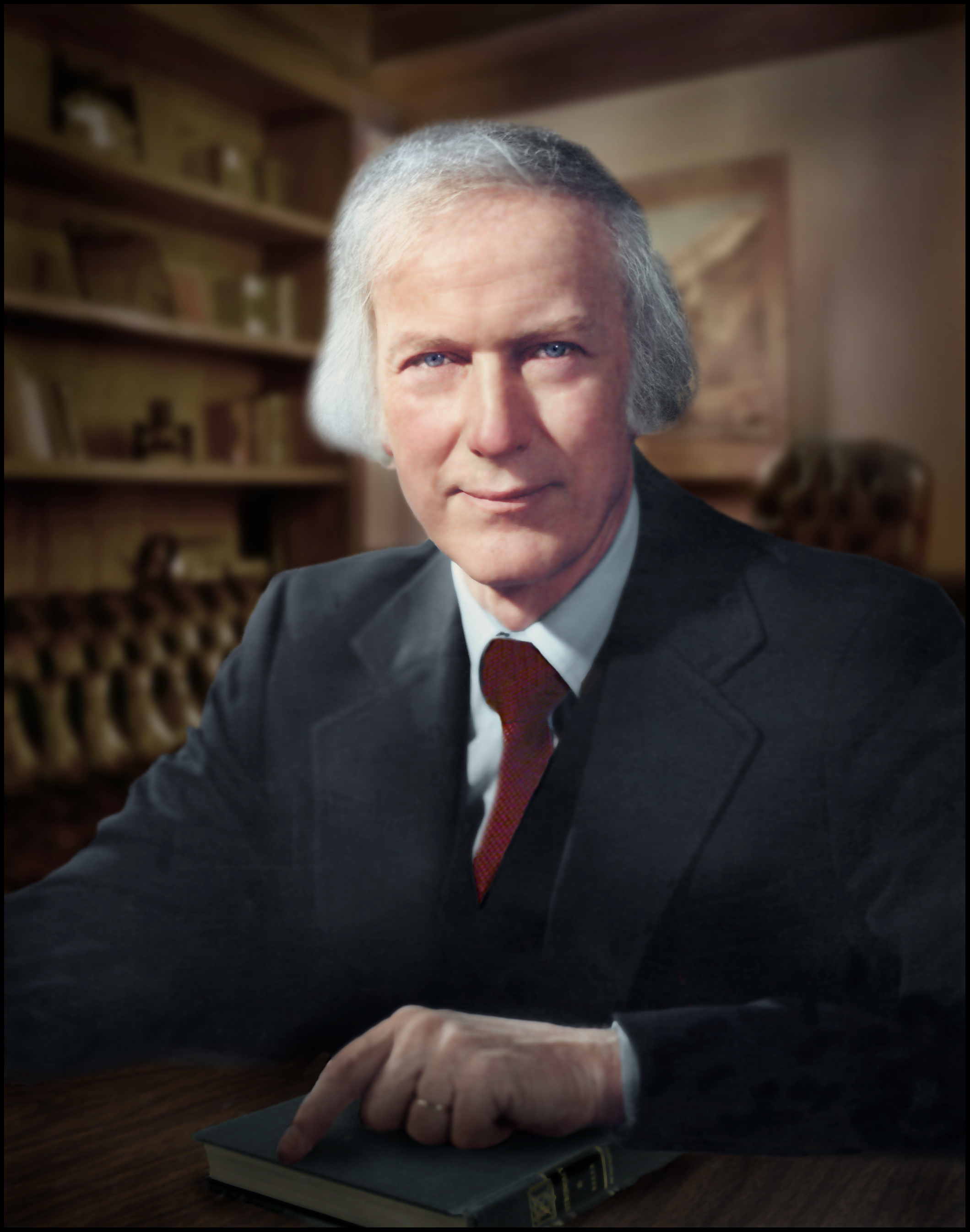
- Arthur D. Code (1923–2009)
- Born: August 13, 1923; Brooklyn, New York
- Died: March 11, 2009 (aged 85); Madison, Wisconsin
- Education: University of Chicago
- Children: Alan Code
- Scientific career
- Fields: Astronomy
- Workplaces: University of Wisconsin–Madison
- Thesis: Radiative equilibrium in an atmosphere in which pure scattering and pure absorption both play a role (1950)
- Doctoral advisor: Subrahmanyan Chandrasekhar

Arthur Dodd Code (August 13, 1923 – March 11, 2009) was an astronomer who designed orbiting observatories.

Code served as an electronics technician in the Navy during World War II.

Arthur Code was born in Brooklyn, N.Y., and developed an early interest in astronomy when he was young. After military service, Code received a master's degree and doctorate in astronomy and astrophysics from the University of Chicago (without having received a bachelor's degree) advised by Subrahmanyan Chandrasekhar. He spent the majority of his career at the University of Wisconsin, where he was also director of the Washburn Observatory. He had previously taught at the University of Virginia and the California Institute of Technology.

Code was one of the leaders of the OAO-2 project, an orbiting satellite that had light sensors, spectrometers, and various other radiation detectors. Data from OAO-2 demonstrated that young stars were hotter than previously believed, and also showed the existence of ozone in Mars's atmosphere. OAO-2 continued to operate until 1973 and supported Dr. Code's contention, stating “a fully automated observatory like this is a good idea; we know it works.” Code did a number of projects for NASA throughout the years, with himself claiming that he has been involved in "Space Astronomy" since the formation of the governmental space organization. Code was a transformative figure in astronomical physics. In a biography published by the Harvard Square Library, Code says, "The thread that runs through all this research is the development of instruments that would provide quantitative measurements that could confirm or rule out theoretical predictions on the structure, formation, and evolution of stars, and to study the connection with other galaxies of stars and the space between the stars."

He was the founding director of the Space Telescope Science Institute. The Space Telescope Science Institute was founded in 1982 and has helped guide the most famous space telescope in history, the Hubble Space Telescope.

The cause of Code's death was from complications of a lung condition. He was survived by his wife of sixty-six years, Mary Ella Guild Code. He had four children: Alan Code, Douglas Code, Edith Code, and David Code; and six grandchildren.
