= (163249) 2002 GT =

Apollo asteroid

Discovery
- Discovered by: Spacewatch
- Discovery site: Kitt Peak National Obs.
- Discovery date: 3 April 2002

Designations
- Minor planet category: NEO · PHA · Apollo

Orbital characteristics
- Epoch 13 January 2016 (JD 2457400.5)
- Uncertainty parameter 0
- Observation arc: 5114 days (14.00 yr)
- Aphelion: 1.7945 AU (268.45 Gm)
- Perihelion: 0.89422 AU (133.773 Gm)
- Semi-major axis: 1.3444 AU (201.12 Gm)
- Eccentricity: 0.33483
- Orbital period (sidereal): 1.56 yr (569.33 d)
- Mean anomaly: 196.65°
- Mean motion: 0° 37^{m} 56.352^{s} / day (n)
- Inclination: 6.9681°
- Longitude of ascending node: 201.76°
- Argument of perihelion: 135.09°
- Earth MOID: 0.0161099 AU (2.41001 Gm)

Physical characteristics
- Mean diameter: 350-500 m
- Synodic rotation period: 3.7663 h (0.15693 d)
- Absolute magnitude (H): 18.4

(163249) 2002 GT is an Apollo asteroid with an absolute magnitude of 18.26. It is a potentially hazardous asteroid as its orbit crosses that of Earth.

== Description ==
In 2011, NASA considered sending the unmanned spacecraft Deep Impact toward the asteroid with the aim of performing a flyby in 2020. It was uncertain whether Deep Impact carried sufficient fuel for this operation.

On 24 November 2011 and 4 October 2012, the space probe's thrusters were fired briefly for two trajectory correction maneuvers that targeted Deep Impact for an encounter with 2002 GT in 2020, possibly within a distance of about 200 kilometers. However, funding for the flyby mission was not guaranteed. In June 2013 the asteroid was observed in radar by the Arecibo Observatory.

However, on 8 August 2013 NASA lost communication with the spacecraft, and on 20 September 2013, NASA abandoned further attempts to contact the craft. According to A'Hearn, the most probable reason of software malfunction was a Y2K-like problem (at 11 August 2013 0:38:49 it was 2^{32} deciseconds from 1 January 2000).

== See also ==
- List of minor planets and comets visited by spacecraft
