= 85D/Boethin =

Lost comet

Discovery
- Discovered by: Leo Boethin
- Discovery date: 4 January 1975

Designations
- MPC designation: D/1975 A1; D/1985 T2
- Alternative designations: 1975 I, 1986 I; 1975a, 1985n

Orbital characteristics
- Epoch: 1 June 2007 (JD 2454252.5)
- Observation arc: 11.07 years (Not observed in 40 years)
- Number of observations: 51
- Aphelion: 9.235 AU
- Perihelion: 1.135 AU
- Semi-major axis: 5.185 AU
- Eccentricity: 0.78116
- Orbital period: 11.806 years
- Inclination: 4.295°
- Longitude of ascending node: 359.39°
- Argument of periapsis: 37.618°
- Mean anomaly: 313.19°
- Last perihelion: 29 July 2020? (unobserved)
- Next perihelion: 30 November 2031? (lost since 1986)
- T_{Jupiter}: 2.247
- Earth MOID: 0.149 AU

Physical characteristics
- Mean radius: 0.7–4.6 km (0.43–2.86 mi) (Note: Estimated size of the original nucleus before disintegrating, based on observations taken during its 1975 and 1986 apparitions.)
- Geometric albedo: 0.04 (assumed)
- Apparent magnitude: 12.0 (1975 apparition)

Comet Boethin (officially 85D/Boethin) was a periodic Jupiter-family comet discovered in 1975 by Leo Boethin. It appeared again in January 1986 as expected. Although the comet was next expected at perihelion in April 1997, no observations were reported, and the comet is thought to have disintegrated sometime after it was last observed in March 1986. The comet might have come to perihelion in late July 2020, but the uncertainty in the comet's position is hundreds of millions of km. The old orbit would have the comet next coming to perihelion around November 2031.

== Discovery circumstances ==
The comet was discovered under unusual circumstances. Comet 85D/Boethin was the first comet discovered by an observer in the Philippines. Leo Boethin (1912–1998), who was a Catholic priest of the Society of the Divine Word assigned to the Abra province in 1949, had taken advantage of the exceptionally dark skies of Luzon to observe comets and meteor showers. In January 1973, he found his first suspected comet at magnitude 9.5, but he saw it fading after a few nights down to magnitude 13 before he could send a telegram with his observations to Brian Marsden at the Central Bureau for Astronomical Telegrams. Marsden, skeptical of the report, responded that a short-lived outburst was possible, but that the discovery could not be confirmed.

Following his first observations of comet 85D/Boethin on 4–7 January 1975, Boethin sent a Special Delivery letter to Marsden, reporting the discovery of a possible new comet of magnitude 12, using his 8-inch telescope. Before the invention of email, telegrams were expensive, and Boethin had chosen to send a letter this time. The report took ten days to reach Marsden, and by that time the full Moon made observations impossible. Marsden responded that the delay was unfortunate, and that Boethin should try to cable future reports instead of sending letters, which could take weeks to arrive from the remote Abra province. Marsden was not optimistic that the comet could be recovered. Defying the odds, Boethin was able to observe his comet again in late January and early February, and he sent a telegram to the Central Bureau for Astronomical Telegrams. Using the new report, Marsden was able to calculate an ephemeris for the comet, and it was quickly confirmed by other observers. Marsden sent his congratulations, saying that the discovery circumstances had been "quite incredible" and that such a delay of confirmation was unheard of since the breakdown of international communication in World War II.

Comet 85D/Boethin was quite faint for a visual discovery, which had been made possible only by the very dark skies of Abra province. Observers with telescopes much larger than Boethin's had difficulties to see the object. Marsden noted that this was also true for Boethin's earlier reports from 1973, probably contributing to the unsuccessful confirmation in that case. He offered a free subscription to the IAU Circulars, expressing his hope that Boethin could use the money saved from the subscription to pay for telegrams in case of future discoveries. Boethin never found a new comet again.

In 2003, Gary Kronk and Brian Marsden noticed that the object that Leo Boethin observed in 1973 was actually 104P/Kowal 2, which had not been officially discovered until 1979. From Boethin's report, it was apparent that comet Kowal 2 had been in a short, major outburst in 1973.

== Orbit ==
85D/Boethin was a Jupiter-family comet with an orbital period of 11.81 years and a moderate inclination of 4.3°. It had been captured in a 1:1 orbital resonance with Jupiter for at least the last couple of centuries. At the time of its discovery, it was only the second object known to be in such resonance, after 56P/Slaughter–Burnham. It has been suggested that comets in this resonance might originate from the Jupiter trojans. 85D/Boethin came within 0.63 AU (94 million km) of Jupiter in August 1995.

== Target of EPOXI mission, loss of comet ==
It was to be a target of NASA's EPOXI comet-exploration mission in December 2008. However, the comet was not recovered in time to set up the trajectory for the flyby with sufficient accuracy, and EPOXI switched to its backup target, 103P/Hartley. It is thought that 85D/Boethin may have broken into pieces too small for visual detection. As a result, its designation was changed from 85P to 85D on 9 June 2017, signifying that it has been lost and has possibly broken up.

== See also ==
- Filipino names in space

== Notes ==
Numbered comets
| Previous; 84P/Giclas | 85D/Boethin | Next; 86P/Wild |
