= 4383 Suruga =

Main-belt asteroid

Discovery
- Discovered by: Y. Oshima
- Discovery site: Gekko Observatory
- Discovery date: 1 December 1989

Designations
- Named after: Suruga Province (Japanese province)
- Alternative designations: 1989 XP · 1979 BE_{2} 1981 UD_{10} · 1983 DN; 1985 UL_{4} · 1985 VB_{4}
- Minor planet category: main-belt · (inner) · Vestian

Orbital characteristics
- Epoch 4 September 2017 (JD 2458000.5)
- Uncertainty parameter 0
- Observation arc: 38.36 yr (14,012 days)
- Aphelion: 2.5785 AU
- Perihelion: 2.2725 AU
- Semi-major axis: 2.4255 AU
- Eccentricity: 0.0631
- Orbital period (sidereal): 3.78 yr (1,380 days)
- Mean anomaly: 150.70°
- Mean motion: 0° 15^{m} 39.24^{s} / day0
- Inclination: 7.1538°
- Longitude of ascending node: 88.532°
- Argument of perihelion: 317.89°
- Known satellites: 1

Physical characteristics
- Dimensions: 6.471±0.088 km 7.13 km (calculated)
- Synodic rotation period: 3.811±0.005 h (dated); 3.4069±0.0004 h
- Geometric albedo: 0.20 (assumed); 0.320±0.038
- Spectral type: V · S
- Absolute magnitude (H): 12.8 · 12.86±0.29 · 13.1

4383 Suruga, provisional designation 1989 XP, is a Vestian asteroid and binary system from the inner regions of the asteroid belt, approximately 6.5 kilometers in diameter and it was discovered on 1 December 1989, by Japanese astronomer Yoshiaki Oshima at Gekko Observatory, Japan. The asteroid was named after the former Japanese Suruga Province. Its synchronous minor-planet moon measures approximately 1.33 kilometers and has a period of 16.386 hours.

== Orbit and classification ==
Suruga is an orbital member of the Vesta family in the inner main-belt. It orbits the Sun at a distance of 2.3–2.6 AU once every 3 years and 9 months (1,380 days). Its orbit has an eccentricity of 0.06 and an inclination of 7° with respect to the ecliptic.

The asteroid was first identified as 1979 BE_{2} at Crimea–Nauchnij in 1979. Its observation arc begins in 1981, when it was identified as 1981 UD_{10} at the Australian Siding Spring Observatory, extending the body's observation arc by 8 years prior to its official discovery observation.

== Physical characteristics ==
Suruga has been characterized as a bright V-type asteroid by PanSTARRS' photometric survey.

=== Rotation and shape ===
In February 2013, a rotational lightcurve of Suruga was obtained from photometric observations by American astronomer Brian Warner at his Palmer Divide Observatory (714) in Colorado. Lightcurve analysis gave a well-defined rotation period of 3.4069 hours with a brightness variation of 0.14 magnitude (U=3), which indicates a nearly spheroidal shape.

These observations supersede a period of 3.4069 hours (Δmag 0.08) of an ambiguous lightcurve, obtained by Japanese astronomers during lightcurve survey of V-type asteroids in December 2002 (U=1+).

=== Diameter and albedo ===
According to the survey carried out by NASA's Wide-field Infrared Survey Explorer with its subsequent NEOWISE mission, Suruga measures 6.471 kilometers in diameter and its surface has an albedo of 0.320, while the Collaborative Asteroid Lightcurve Link assumes a standard albedo for stony asteroids of 0.20 and calculates a diameter of 7.13 kilometers with an absolute magnitude of 13.1.

=== Satellite ===
During Brian Warner's photometric observations in 2013, it was revealed, that Suruga is a synchronous binary system with a minor-planet moon in orbit. The satellite has an orbital period of 16.386. Based on the brightness variations of the mutual eclipsing/occultation events, Warner estimates that the satellite's mean-diameter is at least 21% of that of Suruga's (D_{s}/D_{p} of >0.21±0.02). The Johnston's Archive derives a satellite diameter of 1.33 kilometer and estimates a semi-major axis of 11 kilometers for the moon's orbit.

== Naming ==
This minor planet was named after the former Suruga Province, what is now the Shizuoka Prefecture in central Japan. It is the place where the discovering Gekko Observatory is located (also see 4261 Gekko). The approved naming citation was published by the Minor Planet Center on 28 May 1991 (M.P.C. 18307).
