= Kenzo Suzuki =

Kenzo Suzuki may refer to:

- Kenzo Suzuki (wrestler)
- Kenzo Suzuki (astronomer)
