= 5592 Oshima =

Minor planet

Discovery
- Discovered by: K. Suzuki; T. Urata
- Discovery site: Toyota Obs.
- Discovery date: 14 November 1990

Designations
- Named after: Yoshiaki Oshima (Japanese astronomer)
- Alternative designations: 1990 VB_{4} · 1955 RA
- Minor planet category: main-belt · (outer); Veritas

Orbital characteristics
- Epoch 23 March 2018 (JD 2458200.5)
- Uncertainty parameter 0
- Observation arc: 62.13 yr (22,693 d)
- Aphelion: 3.3830 AU
- Perihelion: 2.9610 AU
- Semi-major axis: 3.1720 AU
- Eccentricity: 0.0665
- Orbital period (sidereal): 5.65 yr (2,063 d)
- Mean anomaly: 26.407°
- Mean motion: 0° 10^{m} 28.2^{s} / day
- Inclination: 8.4938°
- Longitude of ascending node: 231.63°
- Argument of perihelion: 99.822°

Physical characteristics
- Mean diameter: 22.657±0.211 km 22.96±0.87 km 24.6±0.2 km 25.32 km (derived); 25.43±2.5 km 30.47±11.41 km 38.39±4.47 km
- Synodic rotation period: 12.54±0.02 h
- Geometric albedo: 0.0301±0.0059; 0.04±0.09; 0.0479 (derived); 0.06±0.01; 0.0666±0.0040; 0.0686±0.016; 0.076±0.003; 0.086±0.007
- Spectral type: C (Pan-STARRS); C (SDSS-MOC); Caa (S3OS2-TH); Ch (S3OS2-BB)
- Absolute magnitude (H): 11.50; 11.68±0.37; 11.7; 11.80; 11.9

5592 Oshima, provisional designation 1990 VB_{4}, is a Veritasian asteroid from the outer regions of the asteroid belt, approximately 25 kilometers (16 miles) in diameter. It was discovered on 14 November 1990, by astronomers Kenzo Suzuki and Takeshi Urata at the Toyota Observatory, and later named after Japanese astronomer Yoshiaki Oshima. The carbonaceous C-type asteroid has a rotation period of 12.5 hours.

== Orbit and classification ==
Oshima is a core member of the Veritas family (609), a young family of carbonaceous asteroids, that formed approximately 8.5±0.5 million years ago. The family is named after 490 Veritas and consists of nearly 1,300 members. Other members of this family include 1086 Nata and 2934 Aristophanes.

This asteroid orbits the Sun in the outer main belt at a distance of 3.0–3.4 AU once every 5 years and 8 months (2,063 days; semi-major axis of 3.17 AU). Its orbit has an eccentricity of 0.07 and an inclination of 8° with respect to the ecliptic. The body's observation arc begins with its first observation as 1955 RA at Goethe Link Observatory in September 1955, more than 35 years prior to its official discovery observation at Toyota.

== Physical characteristics ==
Oshima has been characterized as a carbonaceous C-type asteroid by Pan-STARRS and in the SDSS-based taxonomy. The Small Solar System Objects Spectroscopic Survey (S3OS2) it is classified as a Caa and hydrated Ch-type in the survey's Tholen- and SMASS-like taxonomy, respectively.

=== Rotation period ===
In September 2006, a rotational lightcurve of Oshima was obtained from photometric observations by French amateur astronomer Laurent Bernasconi. Lightcurve analysis gave a rotation period of 12.54±0.02 hours with a brightness amplitude of 0.28 magnitude (U=2).

=== Diameter and albedo ===
According to the surveys carried out by the Infrared Astronomical Satellite IRAS, the Japanese Akari satellite and the NEOWISE mission of NASA's Wide-field Infrared Survey Explorer, Oshima measures between 22.657 and 30.47 kilometers in diameter and its surface has an albedo between 0.04 and 0.086.

The Collaborative Asteroid Lightcurve Link derives an albedo of 0.0479 and a diameter of 25.32 kilometers based on an absolute magnitude of 11.9.

== Naming ==
This minor planet was named by the second discoverer after Japanese astronomer Yoshiaki Oshima, a prolific discoverer of minor planets himself at the Gekko Observatory during the late 1990s. The official naming citation was published by the Minor Planet Center on 1 September 1993 (M.P.C. 22511).
