= Yoshiaki Oshima =

Japanese astronomer

Minor planets discovered: 61
see § List of discovered minor planets

Yoshiaki Oshima (大島 良明, Ōshima Yoshiaki) (born 1952) is a Japanese astronomer at Gekko Observatory and prolific discoverer of 61 asteroids as credited by the Minor Planet Center, and include the binary asteroid 4383 Suruga, the potentially hazardous object (7753) 1988 XB and the Jupiter trojan 4715 Medesicaste.

== International asteroid monitoring project ==
Japan Spaceguard Association (JSGA) is keen to have astronomical education for young people and held Spaceguard Private Investigator of the Stars— the fugitives are asteroids! program in 2001. Yoshiaki Oshima participated as one of the committee member. JSGA submitted a paper on that project in a proceedings, with Oshima as a contributor. (Note: The Spaceguard Private Investigator of the Stars, an asteroid monitoring program for the youth, was made possible by the special cooperation by the Japan Space Forum, as well as sponsorship from Institute of Space and Astronautical Science, National Astronomical Observatory of Japan, National Space Development Agency of Japan along with John Moores University and Armar Observatory in the UK.)

JSGA held an astronomical education program as part of their International Asteroid Monitoring Project, that collaborated with the British Council and its International Schools' Observatory (ISO) program which had involved 12 teams of junior high to senior high school classes from Asian and European countries. (Note: UK has "National Schools' Observatory", an astronomical education for young people, which is held with John Moores University in Liverpool. The University operates a robotic telescope in the Canary Islands, and schools are allowed that they carry out scientific research using the remote telescope.)

The Private Investigator of Stars was co-sponsored by the British Council which advised the International Asteroid Monitoring Project by coordinating observatory in the Canary islands and participating laboratories for ISO. Yomiuri Shimbun newspaper held an asteroid hunting contest for the JSGA and run articles on their pages. 438 school classes and other teams signed up with 1,317 indibivisuals, and 133 teams reported the results of their observation.

JSGA based its project headquarters in its observatory called Bisei Spaceguard Center, owned by the Japan Space Forum. An optical telescope on the Canary island has been operated by the staff of Astrophysics Research Institute at John Moores University in Liverpool, and images were transmitted to each classroom via internet connection. (Note: The participating teams were supplied with a computer program "Aarteroid Catcher B-612" that JSGA developed to compare images of asteroids in the night sky. Each team will receive images from the Canary Island telescope and compare them with JSGAs' images, and the mission was monitoring asteroid collision and perhaps unknown asteroids. The contest was due 4 March 2001, and Japan Spaceguard Association (JSGA) examined 133 reports for 10 days. On 14 March, the jury meeting was held, and winners were announced on Yomiuri Shimbun on 20 March. Award overview, assessment comments as well as presentation report, interviews to recipients, along with JSGA's prospects for future astronomic education and asteroid hunting projects.)

== Honors ==
The outer main-belt asteroid 5592 Oshima is named after him. The naming citation also mentions his contribution to the development of the instrumentation at the Nihondaira Observatory.

== List of discovered minor planets ==
In 1988, Oshima discovered (7753) 1988 XB, a near-Earth object and potentially hazardous asteroid that approaches the orbit of Earth as close as 2.5 lunar distances. He also discovered 4715 Medesicaste, a 64-kilometer sized Jupiter trojan in 1989. By the end of the same year, he discovered 4383 Suruga a binary with a minor-planet moon. All discoveries he made at the Gekko Observatory (see table below).

3843 OISCA	28 February 1987	list
4157 Izu	11 December 1988	list
4261 Gekko	28 January 1989	list
4293 Masumi	1 November 1989	list
4383 Suruga	1 December 1989	list
4403 Kuniharu	2 March 1987	list
4715 Medesicaste	9 October 1989	list
4840 Otaynang	23 October 1989	list
5123 Cynus	28 January 1989	list
5206 Kodomonomori	7 March 1988	list
5258 Rhoeo	1 January 1989	list
5282 Yamatotakeru	2 November 1988	list
5353 Baillie	20 December 1989	list
5397 Vojislava	14 November 1988	list
5730 Yonosuke	13 October 1988	list
5740 Toutoumi	29 November 1989	list
(5810) 1988 EN	10 March 1988	list
(6903) 1989 XM	2 December 1989	list
(7284) 1989 VW	4 November 1989	list
(7569) 1989 BK	28 January 1989	list
(7753) 1988 XB	5 December 1988	list
(8008) 1988 TQ_{4}	10 October 1988	list
(8157) 1988 XG_{2}	15 December 1988	list
(8349) 1988 DH_{1}	19 February 1988	list
(9174) 1989 WC_{3}	27 November 1989	list

(9314) 1988 DJ_{1}	19 February 1988	list
(9320) 1988 VN_{3}	11 November 1988	list
(9940) 1988 VM_{3}	11 November 1988	list
10065 Greglisk	3 December 1988	list
(10299) 1988 VS_{3}	13 November 1988	list
(10751) 1989 UV_{1}	29 October 1989	list
(11034) 1988 TG	9 October 1988	list
(11035) 1988 VQ_{3}	12 November 1988	list
(11862) 1988 XB_{2}	7 December 1988	list
(12251) 1988 TO_{1}	9 October 1988	list
(12693) 1989 EZ	9 March 1989	list
13934 Kannami	11 December 1988	list
14843 Tanna	12 November 1988	list
(14860) 1989 WD_{3}	27 November 1989	list
(15243) 1989 TU_{1}	9 October 1989	list
(16426) 1988 EC	7 March 1988	list
(16434) 1988 VO_{3}	11 November 1988	list
(16436) 1988 XL	3 December 1988	list
(16458) 1989 WZ_{2}	21 November 1989	list
(17426) 1989 CS_{1}	5 February 1989	list
(18346) 1989 WG	20 November 1989	list
(19134) 1988 TQ_{1}	15 October 1988	list
(21018) 1988 VV_{1}	2 November 1988	list
(21021) 1988 XL_{2}	7 December 1988	list
(21034) 1989 WB_{3}	25 November 1989	list

(26099) 1989 WH	20 November 1989	list
(27715) 1989 CR_{1}	5 February 1989	list
(27721) 1989 WJ	20 November 1989	list
(30794) 1988 TR_{1}	15 October 1988	list
(32785) 1989 CU_{1}	10 February 1989	list
(32795) 1989 WA_{3}	21 November 1989	list
(35074) 1989 UF_{1}	25 October 1989	list
(37569) 1989 UG	23 October 1989	list
(37570) 1989 UD_{1}	25 October 1989	list
(37571) 1989 UE_{1}	25 October 1989	list
(69274) 1989 UZ_{1}	29 October 1989	list

== Works ==
- Isobe, S., Atsuo, A., Asher, D., Fuse, T., Hashimoto, N., Nakano, S., K. Nishiyama, Yoshiaki Oshima, Noritsugu Takahashi, J. Terazono, H. Umehara, Takeshi Urata, Makoto Yoshikawa. "Educational program of Japan Spaceguard Association using asteroid search", Spaceguard Detective Agency, Proceedings of Asteroids, Comets, Meteors – ACM 2002. International Conference, 29 July – 2 August 2002

== See also ==
- List of minor planet discoverers § Y. Oshima
