= Spaceguard =

Efforts to study asteroids that might impact Earth

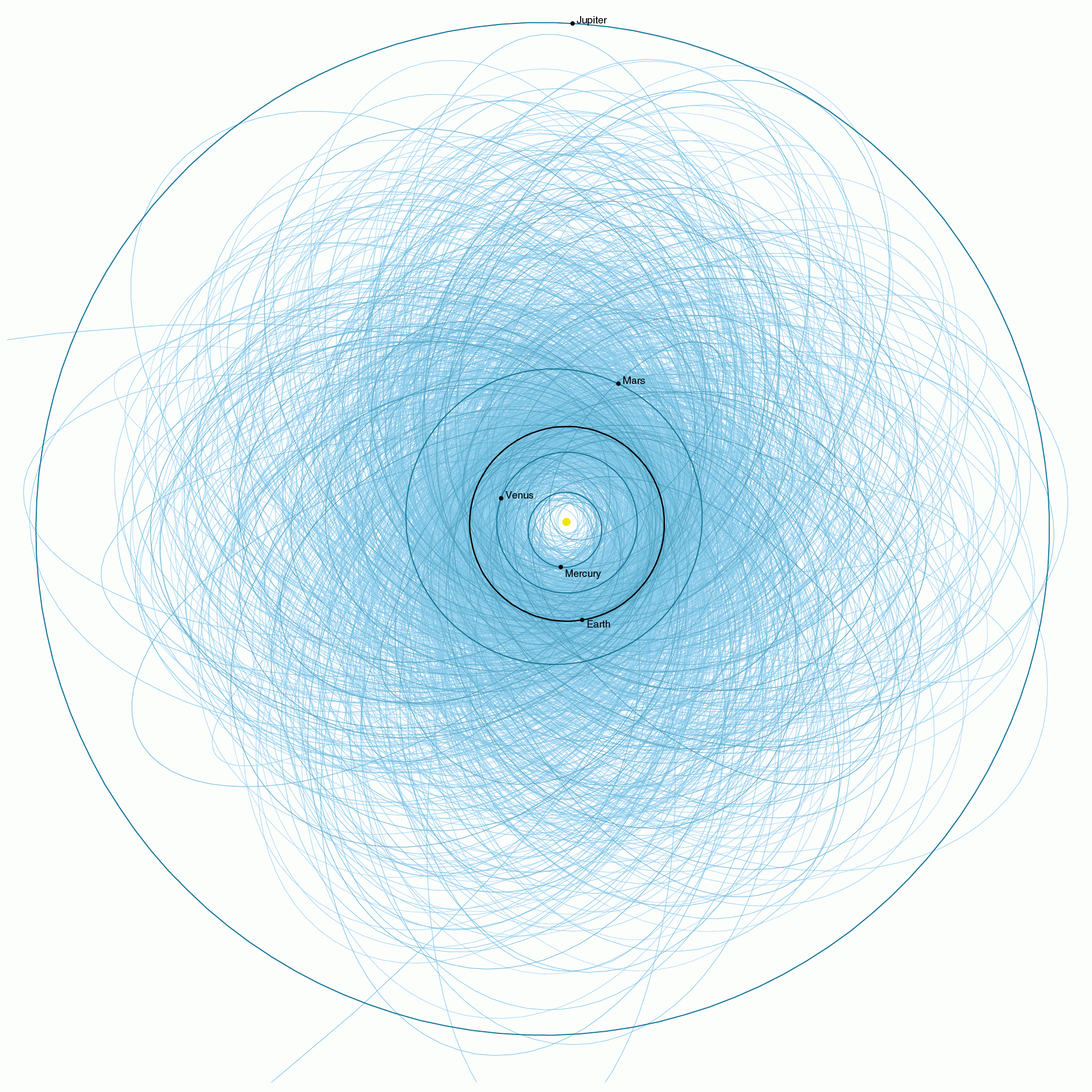
Plot of orbits of known potentially hazardous asteroids (size over 140 metres (460 ft) and passing within 7.6 million kilometres (4.7×10^{6} mi) of Earth's orbit) as of early 2013 (alternative image).

The term Spaceguard loosely refers to a number of efforts to discover, catalogue, and study near-Earth objects (NEOs), especially those that may impact Earth (potentially hazardous objects).

Asteroids are discovered by telescopes which repeatedly survey large areas of sky. Efforts which concentrate on discovering NEOs are considered part of the "Spaceguard Survey", regardless of which organization they are affiliated with.

A number of organizations have also raised related discussions and proposals on asteroid-impact avoidance.

== History ==
Arthur C. Clarke coined the term in his novel Rendezvous with Rama (1973) where "Project Spaceguard" was the name of an early warning system created following a fictional catastrophic asteroid impact. This name was later adopted by a number of real life efforts to discover and study near-Earth objects. The name was used for the Survey "with the permission and encouragement of Clarke." A 1992 US Congressional study produced a "Spaceguard Survey Report" which led to a mandate that NASA locate 90% of near-Earth asteroids larger than 1 km within 10 years. This is often referred to as the "Spaceguard Goal." A number of efforts which receive money through NASA are all considered to be working on the "Spaceguard Project."

The effect of the impact of Comet Shoemaker–Levy 9 to Jupiter in July 1994 created a greater perception of importance to the detection of near Earth objects. As David Levy stated in an interview "The giggle factor disappeared after Shoemaker-Levy 9." He was referring to the contemporary attitude that extinction level events were so improbable that those advocating for research for detection and possible deflection methods were only paranoid alarmists. The impact of one of its fragments created a giant dark spot on Jupiter over 12,000 km across, and was estimated to have released an energy equivalent to 6 teratons of TNT (600 times the world's nuclear arsenal). After the impact of Comet Shoemaker-Levy 9, asteroid detection programs all over the world received greater funding.

The Working Group on Near-Earth Objects (WGNEO) of the International Astronomical Union held a workshop in 1995 entitled Beginning the Spaceguard Survey which led to an international organization called the Spaceguard Foundation. Subsequently, there have been Spaceguard associations or foundations formed in countries around the world to support the ideas of discovering and studying near-Earth objects. Generally, the Spaceguard organizations formed within individual countries are associated with the international foundation or with the NASA efforts only by name, common interests, and similar goals.

The initial Spaceguard Goal was achieved, although in slightly longer than 10 years. An extension to the project gave NASA the mandate of reducing the minimum size at which more than 90% of near-Earth asteroids are known to 140 m.

== Observations ==
The 2002 Eastern Mediterranean event and the Chelyabinsk meteor (Russia, February 2013) were not detected in advance by any Spaceguard effort. On October 6, 2008, the 4-meter 2008 TC_{3} meteoroid was detected by the Catalina Sky Survey (CSS) 1.5 meter telescope at Mount Lemmon, and monitored until it hit the Earth the next day.

New survey projects, such as the Asteroid Terrestrial-impact Last Alert System (ATLAS) program operated by the University of Hawaiʻi, aim to greatly increase the number of small (down to approximately 10 m) impactors that are discovered before atmospheric entry—typically with days to weeks of warning, enabling evacuations of the affected areas and damage mitigation planning. This is in contrast to other surveys which focus on finding much larger (greater than 100 m) objects years to decades before any potential impacts, at times when they could potentially still be deflected away from Earth.

Another short-term warning system is the NASA Scout program that came into operation in 2016.

On October 19, 2017, one of the Survey telescopes, Pan-STARRS 1, discovered the first interstellar asteroid, ʻOumuamua.

The United Kingdom also hosts the self-styled Spaceguard Centre which conducts astrometric research (MPC code J26) and is open to the general public daily, but it is not affiliated with or supported by any public body.

== Issues ==
According to Dr. Michael A'Hearn, a typical mission would take too long from approval to launch if there was an emergency:

REP. STEWART: ... are we technologically capable of launching something that could intercept [an asteroid]? ... DR. A'HEARN: No. If we had spacecraft plans on the books already, that would take a year ... I mean a typical small mission ... takes four years from approval to start to launch ...

— Representative Chris Stewart (R, Utah) and Dr. Michael F. A'Hearn, 10 April 2013, United States Congress

Lack of a master plan and dangers of false alarms have been pointed out by Stefan Lövgren.

== See also ==
- Spaceguard Foundation
  - Bisei Spaceguard Center
  - Japan Spaceguard Association
- Asteroid-impact avoidance (includes list of survey projects)
- Asteroid impact prediction
- B612 Foundation
- NEOShield
- Planetary Defense Coordination Office
- Impact event
  - Tunguska event, 1908
- List of meteor air bursts
  - Chelyabinsk meteor, Russia, February 2013
