= Japan Spaceguard Association =

Nonprofit organisation

- Company type: Specified Nonprofit Corporation
- Industry: astronomy
- Founded: October 20, 1996
- Headquarters: Tokyo, Japan
- Revenue: non-profit
- Website: www.spaceguard.or.jp

The Japan Spaceguard Association (日本スペースガード協会, nihon supēsugādo kyōkai; abbreviated JSGA) is a not-for-profit organization based in Tokyo, Japan. Its formal status under the Japanese law is Specified Nonprofit Corporation (特定非営利活動法人).

== Missions ==
The aims of the Japan Spaceguard Association (JSGA) echoes that of The Spaceguard Foundation and other spaceguard movements: to protect the Earth's environment from a disastrous near-Earth object (NEO) collision by studying and observing the NEOs.

JSGA operates the Bisei Spaceguard Center, owned by the Japan Space Forum, to achieve their goal. It is located near Bisei town in the western Japan. In addition to the search for NEOs, this facility will be used to track debris in Earth's orbit. The Minor Planet Center credits JSGA with the discovery of the main-belt asteroid (21309) 1996 XH_{5}, made at Kiso Observatory on 6 December 1996.

== International asteroid monitoring project ==
JSGA as being a Specified Nonprofit Corporation, it is keen to have astronomical education for young people and in 2001 held Spaceguard Private Investigators of the Stars: the fugitives are asteroids! rally as part of its asteroid monitoring project. Yoshiaki Oshima was seated at the operating committee and the jury, and JSGA submitted a paper on that project in a proceedings. (Note: The Spaceguard Private Investigators of the Stars as an asteroid monitoring program for the youth was made possible by the special cooperation by the Japan Space Forum, as well as sponsorship from Institute of Space and Astronautical Science, National Astronomical Observatory of Japan, National Space Development Agency of Japan along with Liverpool John Moores University and Armagh Observatory in the UK.) British Council advised JSGA for its contest and supported them to present their project to observatories and laboratories.

To run the contest and along with the Bisei Spaceguard Center, an optical telescope on the Canary island operated by Liverpool John Moores University in Liverpool transmitted images to each participant via internet connection. In total, 438 school classes and other teams signed up with 1,317 people, and 133 group and individual contestants reported the results of their observation. The Yomiuri Shimbun newspaper sponsored the project and run articles reporting the progress of the contest.

The Liverpool John Moores University and their Astrophysics Research Institute operates the National Schools' Observatory program with a robotic telescope on the Canary Islands, and schools in the United Kingdom register to monitor asteroids from remoted locations. They cosponsored the International Schools' Observatory (ISO) program British Council had organized, (Note: The Liverpool John Moores University regularly holds Asteroid Watch program for schools in the UK with "National Schools' Observatory" projects.) when 12 teams of junior high to senior high school classes took part from Asian and European countries.

The contestants for Spaceguard Private Investigators of the Stars sent their reports due March 4, 2001, and JSGA examined 133 reports over the period of two weeks. On 14 March the jury meeting was held, and winners were announced on Yomiuri Shimbun on 20 March 2001. Award overview as well as assessment comments were published along with presentation report and interviews to awardees. JSGA presented the prospectus for future astronomic education and asteroid hunting projects.

== Members ==
Members include Atsuo Asami (浅見 敦夫, Asami Atsuo), a Japanese astronomer who operates the Hadano Astronomical Observatory, located about 60 km southwest of Tokyo, Takeshi Urata and Yoshiaki Oshima.

== See also ==
- Bisei Spaceguard Center
