= The Spaceguard Foundation =

Organization studying near-Earth objects

- Type: not-for-profit organization
- Industry: astronomy
- Founded: March 26, 1996
- Founders: E. Shoemaker, D. Steel, A. Carusi and the Working Group on Near-Earth Objects (WGNEO) of the International Astronomical Union
- Headquarters: Frascati, Italy
- Products: Spaceguard System
- Revenue: non-profit
- Website: spaceguard.esa.int

The Spaceguard Foundation (SGF) is a private organization based in Frascati, Italy, whose purpose is to study, discover and observe near-Earth objects (NEO) and protect the Earth from the possible threat of their collision. The foundation is non-partisan, non-political and non-profit, and acts as the international organization grouping together the spaceguard organizations in various countries, as well as individual astronomers and organizations interested in the foundation's activities.

The foundation was established in Rome in 1996. Since then, it has moved into the ESA Centre for Earth Observation (ESRIN) at Frascati. As of 2007, Italian astronomer Andrea Carusi heads the foundation.

== The Spaceguard System ==
The Spaceguard System is a collection of observatories engaging in near-Earth objects (NEO) observations. The Spaceguard Central Node—the website of the foundation—manages the collection and provides the observatories with services which would optimize the international coordination of NEO followups. The individual observatories in the system participate in these services on a volunteer basis. As of 2007, all the observatories in the system are ground-based.

== Related organizations ==
- Spaceguard Croatia (Croatia)
- Spaceguard Foundation e.V. (Germany)
- Japan Spaceguard Association (Japan)
- Spaceguard UK (United Kingdom)

== See also ==
- B612 Foundation
- Chelyabinsk meteor
- Tunguska event
