= Kenzo Suzuki (astronomer) =

Japanese astronomer

- Born: 鈴木 憲蔵 (Suzuki Kenzō); 1950 (age 75–76)
- Occupation: amateur astronomer
- Known for: A local guide for the Brother Earth planetarium in Nagoya City Science Museum
- Notable work: discoverer of minor planets

Minor planets discovered: 42
see § List of discovered minor planets

Kenzo Suzuki (鈴木 憲蔵, Suzuki Kenzō, b. 1950) is a Japanese astronomer from Toyota, Aichi, Japan. Between 1984 and 1992, he has discovered 42 minor planets mostly in collaboration with astronomers Takeshi Urata and Toshimasa Furuta.

== A local guide for the Brother Earth ==
He is the discoverer of main-belt asteroid 3533 Toyota and it is named after his home town. Asteroid 5526 Kenzo is named after him. For the local community, Suzuki is a lecturer for astronomy and participates in programs at the Brother Earth planetarium, or the world largest planetarium at Nagoya City Science Museum in Aichi Prefecture, Japan. He lets the visitors, ranging from groups of elementary school students to adults, to observe planets through telescopes and shares his experience and insight as a veteran astronomer.

== List of discovered minor planets ==
List of minor planets discovered by Kenzo Suzuki

Name	Discovery Date	Listing
3165 Mikawa	31 August 1984	list^{[A]}
3178 Yoshitsune	21 November 1984	list^{[A]}
3533 Toyota	30 October 1986	list^{[A]}
3733 Yoshitomo	15 January 1985	list^{[A]}
3828 Hoshino	22 November 1986	list^{[A]}
4035 Thestor	22 November 1986	list^{[A]}
4037 Ikeya	2 March 1987	list^{[A]}
4212 Sansyu-Asuke	28 September 1987	list^{[A]}
4374 Tadamori	31 January 1987	list^{[A]}
4445 Jimstratton	15 October 1985	list^{[A]}
4488 Tokitada	21 October 1987	list^{[A]}
4538 Vishyanand	10 October 1988	list
4541 Mizuno	1 January 1989	list^{[B]}
4604 Stekarstrom	18 September 1987	list^{[A]}
4748 Tokiwagozen	20 November 1989	list^{[A]}
4941 Yahagi	25 October 1986	list^{[A]}
4945 Ikenozenni	18 September 1987	list^{[A]}
4998 Kabashima	5 November 1986	list^{[A]}
5240 Kwasan	7 December 1990	list^{[A]}
5482 Korankei	27 February 1990	list^{[A]}
5507 Niijima	21 October 1987	list^{[A]}
5592 Oshima	14 November 1990	list^{[A]}
(5724) 1986 WE	22 November 1986	list^{[A]}

Name	Discovery Date	Listing
(5843) 1986 UG	30 October 1986	list^{[A]}
6444 Ryuzin	20 November 1989	list^{[A]}
(6448) 1991 CW	8 February 1991	list^{[A]}
(6967) 1991 VJ3	11 November 1991	list^{[A]}
7237 Vickyhamilton	3 November 1988	list^{[B]}
7298 Matudaira-gou	26 November 1992	list^{[A]}
(7518) 1989 FG	29 March 1989	list^{[B]}
(8351) 1989 EH_{1}	10 March 1989	list^{[B]}
(9547) 1985 AE	15 January 1985	list^{[A]}
9865 Akiraohta	3 October 1991	list^{[A]}
10725 Sukunabikona	22 November 1986	list^{[A]}
(11478) 1985 CD	14 February 1985	list^{[A]}
(11867) 1989 TW	4 October 1989	list^{[B]}
(14357) 1987 UR	22 October 1987	list^{[A]}
(16408) 1986 AB	11 January 1986	list^{[A]}
(19138) 1989 EJ_{1}	10 March 1989	list^{[B]}
(23456) 1989 DB	26 February 1989	list^{[B]}
(26830) 1990 BB	17 January 1990	list^{[A]}
(32775) 1986 WP2	29 November 1986	list^{[A]}
Co-discovery made with:^{A} T. Urata^{B} T. Furuta

== Bibliography ==
Books

- Saburō Ida; Kenzō Suzuki; Ikuo Takeshita (1977). 103a niyoru sankō seiun [A diffuse nebula photographed with 103a] (in Japanese). Tokyo, Japan: Seibundo shinkōsha.

Journals

- Takao Kobayashi; Syuichi Nakano (2009). Syuichi Nakano (ed.). "Wagakuni amachua ni yoru shōwakusei hakken no rekishi" [History of the minor asteroid discovery - amateur astronomers in Japan] (PDF). 天界 Tenkai. 90 (1012A). α Editorial Board: 546–559. "Table ２. 882, JCPM Oi Station [Kenzō Suzuki]; No.115 81, Toyota [Kenzō Suzuki]"

Magazines

- Kenzō Suzuki (1972). "Sukecchi de kasei-zu ni idomu" [Sketch and draw your own Mars map]. 天文と気象 Tem'mon to Kishō (in Japanese). 地人書館 Chijinshokan Co., Ltd. pp. 16–23. ISSN 0287-7201. Discontinued, published between 1949 and 1983 through volume 15, no.1 to volume 49, no.6 (literary translates as "Astronomy and Meteorology".) Changed name to "Gekkan Temmon" in 1984 which was discontinued since 2007.
- Kenzō Suzuki (1974). "Dokusha no Kansoku repōto - Omoshirokatta 1973-nen no kasei" [Reports from readers - impressive Mars in 1973]. 天文と気象 Tem'mon to Kishō (in Japanese). Vol. 40, no. 5. 地人書館 Chijinshokan Co., Ltd. pp. 28–32. ISSN 0287-7201.
- Kenzō Suzuki (January 1982). "Renzoku satsuei no shōkai" [Basic Seriography]. 天文ガイド Temmon Gaido (in Japanese). Seibundo shinkosha. ISSN 0288-1977.

== See also ==
- List of minor planet discoverers
