= Gekko Observatory =

Astronomical observatory in Kannami, Japan

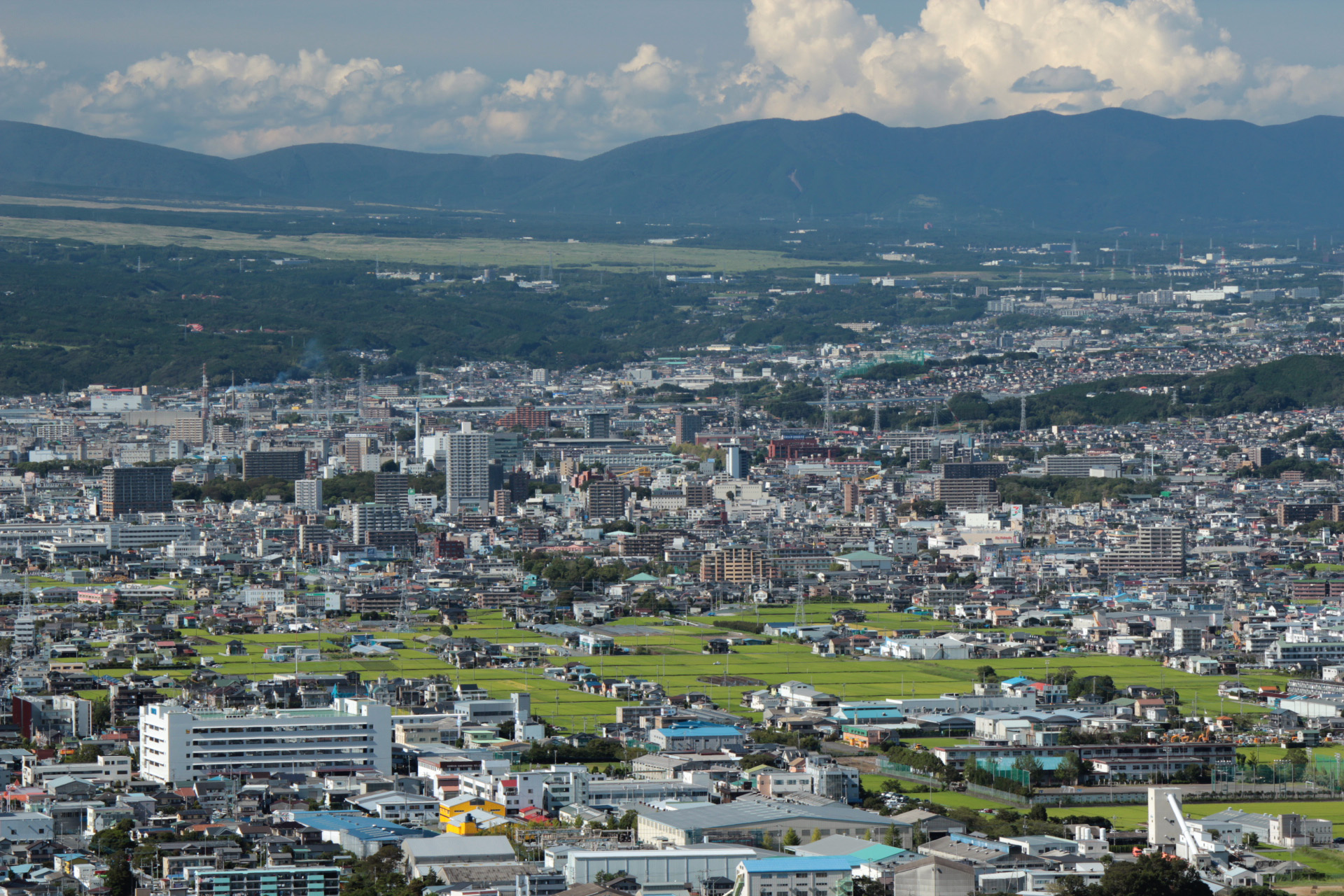
- Alternative names: Gekko Astronomical Observatory
- Observatory code: 888
- Location: Kannami, Numazu metropolitan area, Shizuoka Prefecture, Japan
- Coordinates: 35°07′43″N 138°59′33″E
- Altitude: 312 m (1,024 ft)
- Established: 21 September 1957
- Website: gekkou.or.jp

Telescopes
- Unnamed: 20cm refracting telescope
- Unnamed: 50cm reflecting telescope
- Related media on Commons

Gekko Tenmondai (Japanese: 月光天文台, lit. 'Moonlight Observatory') is an astronomical observatory located in the Shizuoka Prefecture, Japan. It was founded in 1957 by Ananaikyo members and is owned by the International Foundation for Cultural Harmony. Between 1987 and 2000, the astronomers Yoshiaki Oshima and Tetsuo Kagawa discovered 172 minor planets at this site. In 2000, this observatory was ranked 40th in the world for total asteroid discoveries.

Asteroid 4261 Gekko is named after this observatory. The IAU code for this observatory is 888.
