= Ivan Yarkovsky =

Polish-Russian civil engineer (1844–1902)

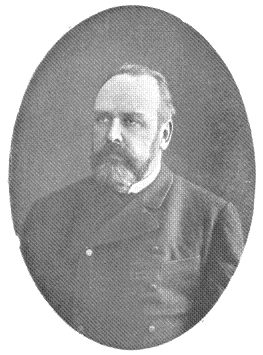
Ivan Yarkovsky

Ivan Osipovich Yarkovsky (Polish: Jan Jarkowski; 24 May 1844, Asveya – 22 January 1902, Heidelberg) was a Polish-Russian civil engineer who also studied physics. He suggested that asteroids and planetary objects could shift their orbits due to asymmetric heating from the sun caused due to their rotation. Objects that are rotating absorb solar radiation from one direction and radiate it back in all directions but differences in heat radiating out can cause a slight force which can alter the orbit of the object leading to a on outward or inward movement depending on the direction of velocity and thermal properties. This has sometimes been called the Yarkovsky effect.

== Life and work ==
Yarkovsky was born to a Polish family in Asveya (Russian Empire, now Belarus). His father Osip Janovic was a noble who lost his title after taking part in the Polish uprising of 1830. The family had then moved from Warsaw to Russian Osveya to become a physician to Count Jan Shadurski. After the death of his father in 1847 Ivan and his mother moved to Moscow where he went to a local school. After the death of his mother, he went to a school for orphans and joined an artillery division in the Caucasus. In 1868 he went to the institute of practical technology in St. Petersburg and became a civil engineer in 1872. He travelled around Europe examining machine building and he worked for a railway company in Kiev-Brest. He married Elena Alexandrovna Sendzikovskaya. In 1873 he moved to the Alexandrovsk railway company working in Minsk, Smolensk and from 1875 in Moscow. He was involved with the Russian technological society where he served as a president in 1889. He worked with Nikolay Egorovich Zhukovsky on aerodynamics of wings. He worked on a ship that could harness wave energy, and examined a range of ideas. He toyed with ideas on electromagnetism, and examined ideas on ether, radiation, and the transmutation of elements. He also took an interest in astronomy, particularly ideas on how the planets were formed and how they cooled. He tried to build a gravity-meter and attempted to see how a solar eclipse (on 19 August 1887) would affect gravity measurements. In 1888 he published a theory of gravity in French. He wrote another edition in 1889 in Russian and in 1891 he wrote on meteorological phenomena. He left the Alexandrovsk railway company in 1894 due to poor health and moved to St. Petersburg with his family of six children. He worked briefly at the Nevsky shipping company, then at the Maltsov locomotive factory at Dyatkovo. He fell ill in 1901 and went to a spa in Badenweiler and died from a sarcoma in Heidelberg.

Yarkovsky's little-known publication was read and acknowledged by Estonian astronomer Ernst J. Öpik in 1951. Öpik had read the pamphlet in 1909 while at school and had remembered that the effect could either add or counter the Poynting-Robertson effect depending on the direction of rotation of the object in relation to its orbit. The same effect was also described by Vladimir Vyacheslavovich Radzievskii (1911-2003) in 1948. David P. Rubincam was able to confirm it in 1987 in the orbit of the satellite LAGEOS. Beginning in the 1970s, long after Yarkovsky's death, his work on the effects of thermal radiation on small objects in the Solar System (e.g., asteroids) was developed into the Yarkovsky effect and the YORP effect. The asteroid 35334 Yarkovsky is named in his honour †. In 1888, he also created a mechanical explanation of gravitation.

== Literature ==
- Yarkovsky, I. O. (1888). Hypothese cinetique de la Gravitation universelle et connexion avec la formation des elements chimiques. Moscow.
