= Temperature lag =

Temperature lag is when the temperature change of an astronomical body lags behind the change in radiation absorbed. This affects large bodies with atmospheres differently from small bodies without.

Large body atmospheric/meteorological examples include:

- Diurnal temperature variation – e.g., peak daily temperature typically occurs after noon
- Seasonal lag – e.g., peak annual temperature typically occurs after the summer solstice

Small body examples include:

- Yarkovsky effect – "daily" or "seasonal" rotational differences between radiation absorption and emission result in asteroids orbits spiraling in to the Sun
- YORP effect – effects of variations between radiation absorption and emission result in asteroids' rotation speeding up
