= YORP =

Yorp or YORP may refer to one of the following:

- 54509 YORP, an Earth co-orbital asteroid
- Yarkovsky–O'Keefe–Radzievskii–Paddack effect, a second-order variation of the Yarkovsky effect
- Youth Organization Registration Program, an initiative of the National Youth Commission (Philippines)
