= 9921 Rubincam =

Asteroid

- Orbit of Rubincam (blue), inner planets and Jupiter (outermost)

Discovery
- Discovered by: S. J. Bus
- Discovery site: Siding Spring Obs.
- Discovery date: 2 March 1981

Designations
- Named after: David Rubincam (American geophysicist)
- Alternative designations: 1981 EO_{18}
- Minor planet category: main-belt · (inner)

Orbital characteristics
- Epoch 4 September 2017 (JD 2458000.5)
- Uncertainty parameter 0
- Observation arc: 63.45 yr (23,175 days)
- Aphelion: 2.5174 AU
- Perihelion: 2.2352 AU
- Semi-major axis: 2.3763 AU
- Eccentricity: 0.0594
- Orbital period (sidereal): 3.66 yr (1,338 days)
- Mean anomaly: 91.234°
- Mean motion: 0° 16^{m} 8.76^{s} / day
- Inclination: 2.4008°
- Longitude of ascending node: 331.39°
- Argument of perihelion: 89.205°

Physical characteristics
- Dimensions: 4.10 km (calculated); 4.250±0.094 km
- Synodic rotation period: 8.01±0.03 h 8.014±0.0017 h
- Geometric albedo: 0.20 (assumed); 0.204±0.035
- Spectral type: S
- Absolute magnitude (H): 14.2 · 14.276±0.001 (R) · 14.3

9921 Rubincam, provisional designation 1981 EO_{18}, is a stony asteroid from the inner regions of the asteroid belt, approximately 4 kilometers in diameter. It was discovered on 2 March 1981, by American astronomer Schelte Bus at the Siding Spring Observatory in Australia, and later named after American geophysicist David Rubincam.

== Orbit and classification ==
Rubincam is a stony S-type asteroid that orbits the Sun in the inner main-belt at a distance of 2.2–2.5 AU once every 3 years and 8 months (1,338 days). Its orbit has an eccentricity of 0.06 and an inclination of 2° with respect to the ecliptic. A first precovery was taken at Palomar Observatory in 1953, extending the body's observation arc by 28 years prior to its official discovery at Siding Spring.

== Physical characteristics ==
=== Lightcurves ===
In February 2010, two rotational lightcurves of Rubincam were obtained from photometric observations at the Palomar Transient Factory in California. Lightcurve analysis gave a rotation period of 8.01 and 8.014 hours with a brightness amplitude of 0.33 and 0.31 in magnitude, respectively (U=3-/2).

=== Diameter and albedo ===
According to the survey carried out by NASA's Wide-field Infrared Survey Explorer with its subsequent NEOWISE mission, Rubincam measures 4.250 kilometers in diameter and its surface has an albedo of 0.204, while the Collaborative Asteroid Lightcurve Link assumes a standard albedo for stony asteroids of 0.20 and calculates a diameter of 4.1 kilometers with an absolute magnitude of 14.3.

== Naming ==
This minor planet was named after David Rubincam (born 1947), an American solid-earth geophysicist and planetary geodynamicist at NASA's Goddard Space Flight Center in Greenbelt, Maryland. He was the first to study the influence of the radiation recoil effects on an asteroid's rotation period and spin axis, which he later named the Yarkovsky–O'Keefe–Radzievskii–Paddack effect or YORP effect for short. The official naming citation was published by the Minor Planet Center on 28 September 2015 (M.P.C. 95803).
