= Ann E. Bailie =

American mathematician (born 1935)

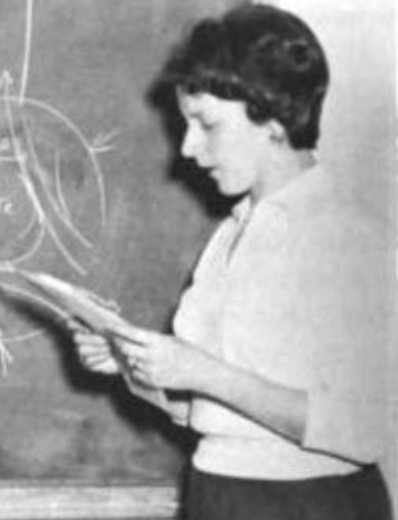
- Ann E. Bailie, from a 1961 publication of the United States Civil Service Commission
- Born: Dorothy Ann Eckels; 1935; Littleton, New Hampshire
- Died: 2022 (aged 86–87)
- Occupation: Mathematician

Dorothy Ann Eckels Bailie (born 1935) is an American mathematician who worked at Goddard Space Flight Center in the 1950s and 1960s. She was one of the three authors of the 1959 report establishing Earth's shape as asymmetrical and "pear-shaped", based on data from Vanguard 1.

== Early life ==
Dorothy Ann Eckels was born in Littleton, New Hampshire and raised in Laconia, New Hampshire, the daughter of John C. Eckels and Dorothy R. Eckels. Her father was a surgeon. Her maternal grandfather, Adolph Frederick Erdmann, was a pioneer in the field of anesthesiology. She earned a bachelor's degree in mathematics at Middlebury College in 1957. While at Middlebury, she was elected Queen of the school's Winter Carnival, an event she co-chaired.

== Career ==
Bailie worked at the United States Naval Research Laboratory after college. By 1959 she worked in the Theoretical Division of NASA's Goddard Space Flight Center, on calculating and analyzing complex orbits for satellites. She, R. Kenneth Squires, and John A. O'Keefe were the team that determined that the Earth was asymmetrical and "pear-shaped", based on data from Vanguard 1.

James E. Webb mentioned Bailie, Nancy Roman, and Eleanor C. Pressly in his 1961 commencement speech at George Washington University, as examples of women in the space program. In 1963, she was named one of the Ten Young Women of the Year by Mademoiselle magazine. Later in her career, she worked at Analytical Mechanics Associates in Maryland.

== Personal life ==
Ann Eckels married accountant William J. Bailie in 1959. They had three children. Her husband died in 2009.
