= DESTINY+ =

Planned asteroid flyby mission by JAXA, using solar electric propulsion

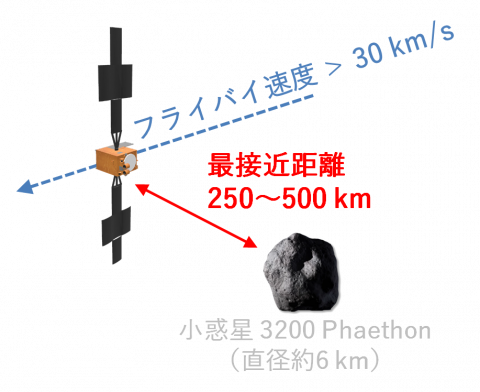
- Names: Demonstration and Experiment of Space Technology for INterplanetary voYage with Phaethon fLyby and dUst Science
- Mission type: Asteroid flyby
- Operator: ISAS / JAXA
- Website: http://destiny.isas.jaxa.jp/
- Mission duration: ≥4 years (planned) cruise: ≈2 years

Spacecraft properties
- Manufacturer: NEC Corporation
- Launch mass: 480 kg (1,060 lb) including 60 kg of xenon and 15.4 kg of hydrazine
- Power: 4.7 kW from solar panels

Start of mission
- Launch date: 2028 (planned)
- Rocket: H3
- Launch site: Tanegashima Space Center
- Contractor: JAXA

Orbital parameters
- Reference system: Geocentric orbit
- Regime: Highly elliptical orbit
- Perigee altitude: 230 km (140 mi)
- Apogee altitude: 40,000 km (25,000 mi)
- Inclination: 30.0°

Flyby of 3200 Phaethon
- Closest approach: 2030 (planned)
- Distance: 500 km (planned)

Transponders
- Band: X-band

Instruments
- DESTINY Dust Analyzer (DDA); Telescopic Camera for Phaethon (TCAP); Multiband Camera for Phaethon (MCAP)
- Medium-class Science Program

DESTINY^{+} (Demonstration and Experiment of Space Technology for INterplanetary voYage with Phaethon fLyby and dUst Science) is a planned mission to fly by the Geminids meteor shower parent body 3200 Phaethon, and sample dust originating from the "rock comet". The spacecraft is being developed by the Japanese space agency JAXA and will demonstrate advanced technologies for future deep space exploration. As of October 2024, DESTINY^{+} is planned to be launched in fiscal year 2028.

== Overview ==
As of 2026, DESTINY+ is targeting launch in Japanese fiscal year 2028 from Tanegashima Space Center aboard an H3 rocket, alongside the European Space Agency's Ramses mission. Under the revised mission plan, DESTINY+ will be injected directly into interplanetary space, with a planned flyby of asteroid 99942 Apophis in 2029 followed by a flyby of 3200 Phaethon in fiscal year 2030.

The mission was originally planned to launch aboard an Epsilon S rocket and spend approximately two years gradually raising its Earth orbit using ion thrusters. Following delays in Epsilon S development, JAXA changed the launch vehicle to H3 and eliminated the Earth-orbit phase. The revised trajectory also creates opportunities to investigate additional small bodies during the interplanetary cruise.

The probe's ion engines have the capability to perform another orbit transfer to study additional objects.

== Objectives ==
DESTINY^{+} will be a technology demonstrator to further improve operations of low cost solar electric propulsion in deep space. It will also demonstrate innovative lightweight solar array panel technology. The scientific aspect of this mission is to understand origin and nature of dusts, which are key sources of organic compounds to Earth. It will also observe dusts from comet/asteroid 3200 Phaethon using a dust analyzer and will map its surface using a multiband telescopic camera to understand the mechanisms of dust ejection. The spacecraft will come as close as 500 km (310 mi) from 3200 Phaethon.

== Spacecraft ==
DESTINY^{+} will use ultra light-weight solar panels and heat-actuated folding radiators, along with compact avionics. The spacecraft is designed to tolerate a radiation dose up to approximately 30 krad by using a 3 mm aluminum shield.

=== Propulsion ===
The spacecraft will be propelled by four μ10 solar electric ion engines, as used by Hayabusa and Hayabusa2, but while its predecessors operated only up to three engines simultaneously, DESTINY^{+} will use all four simultaneously for a total thrust of 40 mN (specific impulse: 3000 seconds; acceleration: 83 μm/s^{2}; power: 1670 watts.) The total dry mass (excludes xenon propellant) of the ion engine system is 59 kg (130 lb).

== Payload ==
DESTINY^{+} will carry three scientific instruments:

- DESTINY Dust Analyzer (DDA) — The DESTINY Dust Analyzer (2.7 kg) will be provided by the German Aerospace Center (DLR), and is being developed by the University of Stuttgart.
- Telescopic Camera for Phaethon (TCAP) — The telescopic camera has a mass of 15.8 kg.
- Multiband Camera for Phaethon (MCAP) — The multiband camera has a mass of 3.5 kg and will detect light in 390 nm, 550 nm, 700 nm, 850 nm wavelengths.

== See also ==
- Lucy – NASA mission to flyby multiple Jupiter trojans
- OKEANOS – proposed JAXA Jupiter trojan flyby mission using solar sail/solar electric propulsion hybrid
- OSIRIS-REx – NASA sample-return mission to the carbonaceous asteroid 101955 Bennu
- Rosetta – ESA mission to comet 67P/Churyumov–Gerasimenko
