= 99942 Apophis =

Potentially hazardous near-Earth asteroid

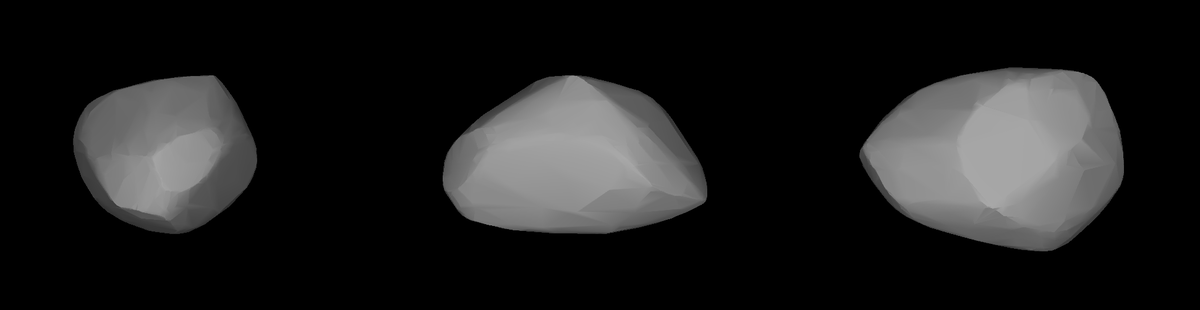
- Model of 99942 Apophis's shape, assuming the entire surface is of a similar composition

Discovery
- Discovered by: Roy A. Tucker; David J. Tholen; Fabrizio Bernardi
- Discovery site: Kitt Peak
- Discovery date: 19 June 2004

Designations
- Pronunciation: /əˈpɒfɪs/ or /əˈpoʊfɪs/; (trad.) /ˈæpəfɪs/
- Named after: Ἄποφις Apophis
- Alternative designations: 2004 MN_{4}
- Minor planet category: Aten; NEO; PHA
- Adjectives: Apophidian /æpəˈfɪdiən/ (Latin Apŏpidis)
- Symbol: (rare)

Orbital characteristics
- Epoch 5 May 2025 (JD 2460800.5)
- Uncertainty parameter 0
- Observation arc: 6599 days (18.07 yr)
- Earliest precovery date: 15 March 2004
- Aphelion: 1.0987 AU (164.36 million km)
- Perihelion: 0.7461 AU (111.61 million km)
- Semi-major axis: 0.9224 AU (137.99 million km)
- Eccentricity: 0.1911
- Orbital period (sidereal): 0.886 yr (323.6 d)
- Average orbital speed: 30.73 km/s
- Mean anomaly: 90.28°
- Mean motion: 1.112°/day
- Inclination: 3.341°
- Longitude of ascending node: 203.9°
- Argument of perihelion: 126.7°
- Earth MOID: 0.000038 AU (5.7 thousand km) (Note: Like all orbital elements, the E-MOID changes depending on the epoch it is defined at. At epoch May 2025, the E-MOID is 0.000038 AU, but in early 2029 it will be around 0.00006 AU (ca 9000 km).)
- Jupiter MOID: 4.1 AU
- T_{Jupiter}: 6.464

Physical characteristics
- Dimensions: 0.370 km (0.230 mi); 0.45 × 0.17 km
- Mean radius: 0.185 km (0.115 mi); 0.17±0.02 km
- Mass: 6.1×10^{10} kg (assumed)
- Mean density: ~3.2 g/cm^{3}; 2.6 g/cm^{3} (assumed)
- Synodic rotation period: 30.4 h (1.27 d); 30.55±0.12 h 30.67±0.06 h Tumbling: 27.38±0.07 h (precession period), 263±6 h (rotation period), 30.56±0.01 h (twice the period of harmonic with strongest lightcurve amplitude)
- Geometric albedo: 0.23; 0.35±0.10
- Temperature: 270 K
- Spectral type: Sq
- Absolute magnitude (H): 19.7±0.4; 19.09±0.19; 18.95±0.15

99942 Apophis (provisional designation 2004 MN_{4}) is a near-Earth asteroid classified as a potentially hazardous object. Its mean diameter is about 340–370 metres (1,120–1,210 ft), while radar observations indicate an elongated shape with a long axis of about 450 metres (1,480 ft) and suggest that it may be bilobed. It was discovered on 19 June 2004 by Roy A. Tucker, David J. Tholen, and Fabrizio Bernardi at Kitt Peak National Observatory. The asteroid was numbered 99942 in 2005 and named after Apophis, the Greek name of the ancient Egyptian serpent deity Apep.

Apophis attracted widespread attention shortly after its discovery because early orbit calculations indicated a possible collision with Earth on 13 April 2029. The estimated probability reached 2.7% on 27 December 2004, and Apophis was rated level 4 on the Torino scale, the highest rating attained by any object. Later that day, the identification of a precovery image from March 2004 extended the observation arc and eliminated the possibility of a 2029 impact. Small probabilities of impacts on later approaches, including in 2036 and 2068, remained for several years, but increasingly precise observations reduced those risks. In 2021, Apophis was removed from the Sentry Risk Table after an impact during the following 100 years was ruled out.

Apophis will nevertheless make an exceptionally close approach to Earth on 13 April 2029, passing about 31,600 kilometres (19,600 mi) above the surface. It is expected to reach magnitude 3.1 and become visible to the naked eye under suitable conditions from parts of Europe, Africa, and western Asia. Earth's gravity will alter its orbit, changing it from an Aten-class asteroid to an Apollo-class asteroid, and tidal forces during the encounter may alter its rotation and partially resurface it.

The 2029 encounter has also made Apophis a target for spacecraft exploration. NASA's OSIRIS-APEX, formerly OSIRIS-REx, is planned to rendezvous with Apophis after the Earth encounter and study it for 18 months. The ESA–JAXA Ramses mission is planned to rendezvous with the asteroid before the encounter.

== Discovery and naming ==
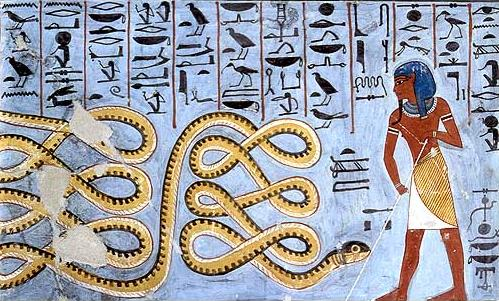
Atum, a form of Ra facing Apep (Apophis) before killing him, tomb of Ramesses I, 19th Dynasty (c. 1292–1290 BC)

Apophis was discovered on 19 June 2004, by Roy A. Tucker, David J. Tholen, and Fabrizio Bernardi at the Kitt Peak National Observatory. On 21 December 2004, Apophis passed 0.0964 AU (14.42 Gm; 8.96 million mi) from Earth. Precovery observations from 15 March 2004 were identified on December 27, and an improved orbit solution was computed. Radar astrometry in January 2005 further refined its orbit solution. The discovery was notable in that it was at a very low solar elongation (56°) and at very long range (1.1 AU).

When first discovered, the object received the provisional designation 2004 MN_{4}, and early news and scientific articles naturally referred to it by that name. Once its orbit was sufficiently well calculated, it received the permanent number 99942 (on 24 June 2005). Receiving a permanent number made it eligible for naming by its discoverers, and they chose the name "Apophis" on 19 July 2005. Apophis is the Greek name of Apep, an enemy of the Ancient Egyptian sun-god Ra. He was the uncreator, an evil serpent that dwelled in the eternal darkness of the Duat and tried to swallow and kill Ra during his nightly passage by devouring him as his food. Apep was held at bay by Set and Horus, the Ancient Egyptian gods of storms and the desert with skies and the plain respectively with Ra's entourage, and Ra beheaded Apep to death forever once in the form of the great feline in the shade of Heliopolis sun temple's persea tree. Apophis will evolve from an Aten- into an Apollo-type asteroid as a result of the 2029 encounter. Apollo asteroids are usually named after Greek deities, Aten asteroids after Egyptian ones. The name Apophis is a nod to that: It is the Greek name of an Egyptian deity.

Tholen and Tucker, two of the co-discoverers of the asteroid, are reportedly fans of the television series Stargate SG-1. One of the show's persistent villains is an alien named Apophis. He is one of the principal threats to the existence of civilization on Earth through the first few seasons, and may have inspired the naming. Tholen denied reports that the asteroid was named after the TV character, stating that the connection is coincidental. In the fictional world of the show, the alien's backstory was that he had lived on Earth during ancient times and had posed as a god, thereby giving rise to the myth of the Egyptian god of the same name.

Proposed symbol for Apophis

The mythological creature Apophis is pronounced with the accent on the first syllable (/ˈæpəfɪs/). (Note: This is normal for classical names in which the penultimate syllable is short.) In contrast, the asteroid's name is generally accented on the second syllable (/əˈpoʊfɪs/, or /əˈpɒfɪs/ as the name was pronounced in the TV series).

Symbols were given to the first few asteroids in the 19th century, though this practice faded when it became clear that there were a great number of them: such symbols are now extremely rarely used by astronomers. In 2008, Denis Moskowitz, a software engineer who devised most of the dwarf planet symbols in Unicode, proposed a symbol for Apophis. His symbol is based on ancient Egyptian depictions of Apep. The added star is similar to many of the 19th-century asteroid symbols.

== Physical characteristics and rotation ==
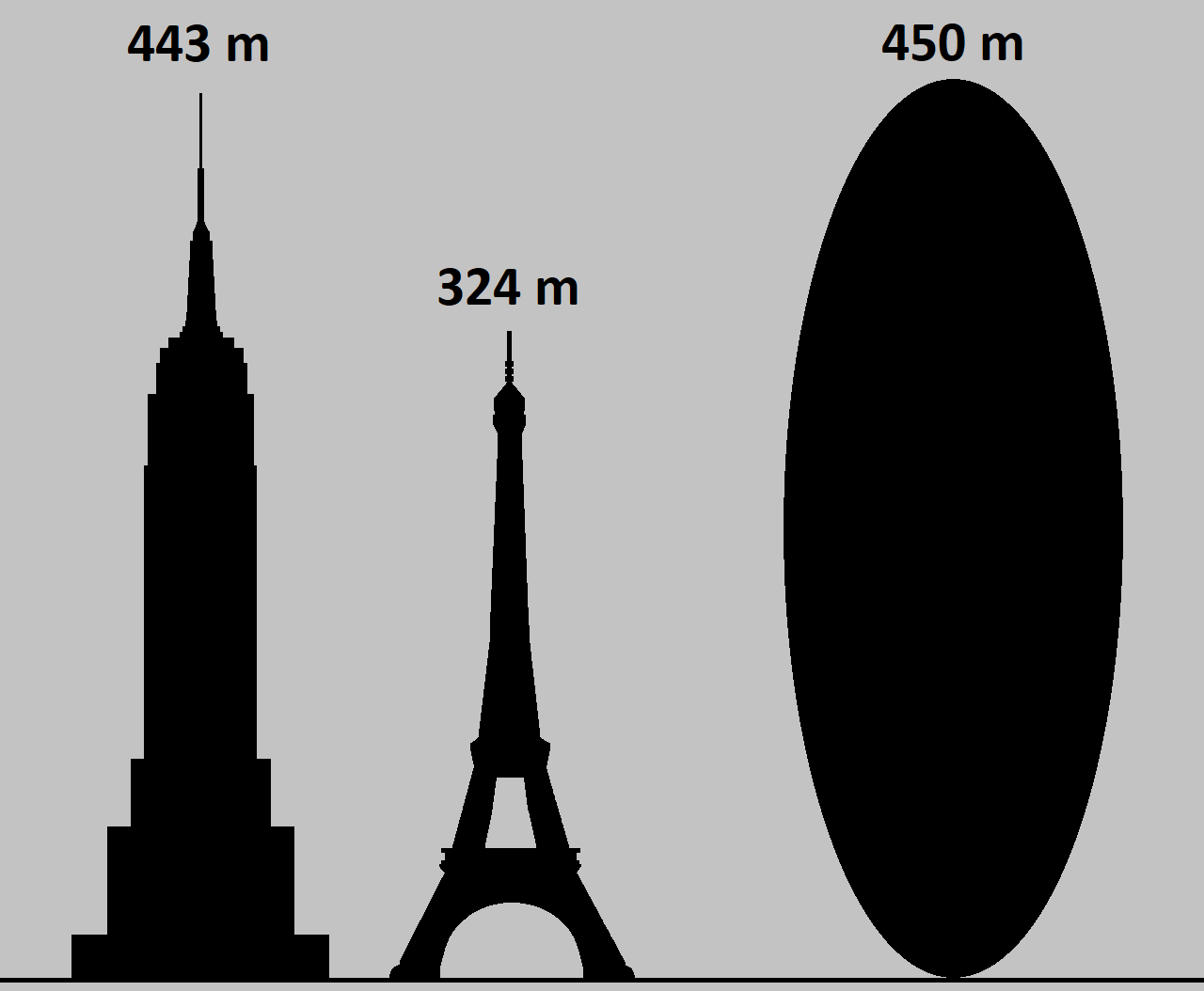
Comparison of possible size of Apophis with the Eiffel Tower and Empire State Building

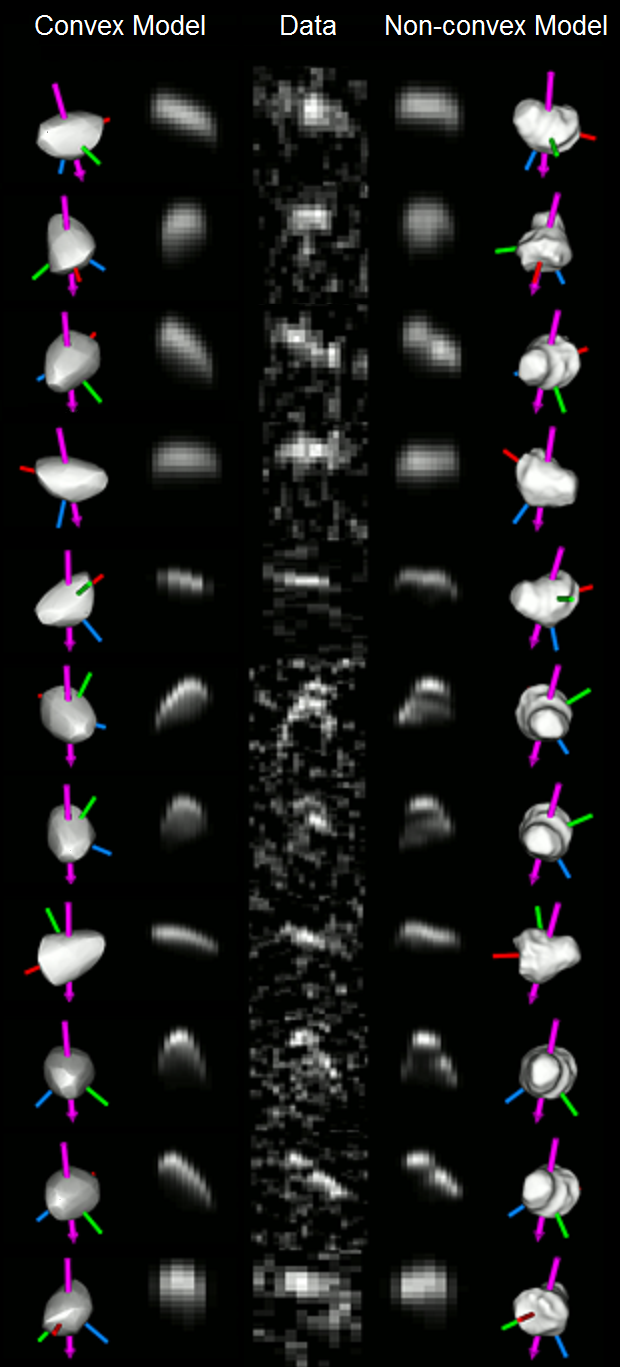
Comparison between the best-fit convex and nonconvex shape models, and some of the available radar images of (99942) Apophis

Based on the observed brightness, Apophis's diameter was initially estimated at 450 metres (1,480 ft); a more refined estimate based on spectroscopic observations at NASA's Infrared Telescope Facility in Hawaii by Binzel, Rivkin, Bus, and Tokunaga (2005) is 350 metres (1,150 ft). As of 2013, NASA's impact risk page listed the diameter at 330 metres (1,080 ft), and an assumed mass of 4×10^{10} kg. The mass estimate is more approximate than the diameter estimate, but should be accurate to within a factor of three. Apophis's surface composition probably matches that of LL chondrites.

Based on Goldstone and Arecibo radar images taken in 2012–2013, Brozović et al. have estimated that Apophis is an elongated object 450 × 170 metres in size, and that it is bilobed (possibly a contact binary) with a relatively bright surface albedo of 0.35±0.10. The axis of its angular momentum points 59° south of the ecliptic, which means that Apophis is a retrograde rotator.

Apophis is a tumbler, which means that it does not rotate around a fixed axis. Rather, the axis of rotation moves in the frame of reference of the asteroid with a period of around 263 hours (called the rotation period). The angle between it and the principal axis of highest moment of inertia varies, as does the angle between that principal axis and the vector of angular momentum (from around 12° to around 55° twice every period). During this period, the angle between the long axis of Apophis and the angular momentum vector swings between around 78° and 102° (90°±12°). But the principal axis of highest moment and the rotation axis both move around the constant axis of angular momentum much faster, with a time-averaged period of 27.38 hours (this is called precession). The result is that Apophis appears to be "flipping", making a revolution on average every 30.56 hours. Every 263 hours, the principal axis with highest moment goes around 263/27.28 times (ca 9.6), whereas the long axis goes around 263/30.56 times (ca 8.6).

== Orbit ==
Apophis has a low inclination orbit (3.3°) that varies from just outside the orbit of Venus (0.746 AU, as compared to the aphelion of Venus, 0.728) to just outside the orbit of Earth (1.099 AU). Although its orbit changes slightly each time it comes close to Earth, at present it comes near Earth once in 7.75 years on average (four times between April 14, 1998, and April 13, 2029). Because of its eccentric orbit, these moments are not evenly spaced and tend to occur between December and April, when Apophis is in the outer portions of its orbit. In fact, the eccentricity and semi-major axis are such that (before 2029) Apophis is always receding from Earth around May 1 and is always approaching around December 2. At the ascending node (where Apophis crosses the plane of Earth's orbit from south to north) Apophis is very close to where Earth is around 13 April of any year, and this is what gives rise to close encounters such as the one on 13 April 2029. The orbit also passes south of where the earth is in mid December, producing for example the close approaches of December 16, 1889, and December 18, 1939. After the 2029 Earth approach, the orbit will change dramatically. The period will change from around 8/9 of a year to a bit under 7/6. It will still come very close to Earth's yearly April 13 location. It will no longer pass close to Earth's yearly mid-December location, but will then pass close to Earth's mid-September location. This will cause a close encounter on 11 September 2102, after which the uncertainty in the location of Apophis will increase rapidly with time.

By 2116, the JPL Small-Body Database and NEODyS close approach data start to become divergent. In April 2116, Apophis is expected to pass about 0.02 AU (3 million km; 8 LD) from Earth, but could pass as close as 0.001 AU (150 thousand km; 0.39 LD) or as far as 0.1 AU (15 million km; 39 LD).

Selected approaches to Earth until 2117
Date	JPL SBDB nominal geocentric distance (AU)	uncertainty region (3-sigma)
2004-12-21	0.09638 AU (14.418 million km)	n/a
2013-01-09	0.09666 AU (14.460 million km)	n/a
2029-04-13	0.000254115 AU (38,015.1 km)	±3.3 km
2036-03-27	0.309678 AU (46.3272 million km)	±130 thousand km
2051-04-20	0.04149 AU (6.207 million km)	±240 thousand km
2066-09-16	0.06943 AU (10.387 million km)	±870 thousand km
2116-04-12	0.01756 AU (2.627 million km)	0.00104 to 0.10433 AU (0.156 to 15.608 million km) (Note: The minimum possible Earth approach between April 5–20, 2116 is 0.00102 AU (153 thousand km). "JPL Horizons" gives 13 million km for 3σ)
2117-10-07	0.48 AU (72 million km)	0.30994 to 0.64045 AU (46.366 to 95.810 million km) (Note: "JPL Horizons" gives 42 million km for 3σ)

=== 2029 close approach ===
Animation of Apophis's orbit in 2028–2029

Around Sun

Around Earth

Sun · Earth · Apophis · Moon
Simulation of the 2029 close approach
Apophis · International Space Station · Satellites

The closest known approach of Apophis will occur on 13 April 2029, at 21:46 UT, when Apophis will pass Earth at a distance of about 31,600 kilometres (19,600 mi) above the surface. Using the June 2024 orbit solution which includes the Yarkovsky effect, the 3-sigma uncertainty region in the 2029 approach distance is about ±3.3 km. The distance, a hair's breadth in astronomical terms, is five times the radius of the Earth, one tenth the distance to the Moon, and closer than the ring of geostationary satellites currently orbiting the Earth. It will be the closest asteroid of its size in recorded history. On that date, it will become as bright as magnitude 3.1 (visible to the naked eye from rural as well as darker suburban areas, visible with binoculars from most locations). The close approach will be visible from Europe, Africa, and western Asia. Over the course of about a day, Apophis will move northwest from Centaurus to Perseus and then southwest to Pisces, an arc of 205°. Approaching Earth its speed relative to Earth will be 6.0 km/s. Earth's gravity will accelerate it to 7.4 km/s at the time of closest approach, and then slow it back down to 6 as it departs. During the approach, Earth will perturb Apophis from an Aten-class orbit with a semi-major axis of 0.92 AU to an Apollo-class orbit with a semi-major axis of 1.1 AU. Perihelion will lift from 0.746 AU to 0.895 AU and aphelion will lift from 1.10 AU to 1.31 AU.

Orbital elements for 2029 (pre-flyby) and 2030 (post-flyby)
Parameter	Epoch	Orbit type	Orbital period	Semi-major axis	Perihelion	Aphelion	Inclination	Eccentricity
Units				AU			(°)	
Pre-flyby	2029	Aten	0.89 years (323.6 days)	0.922	0.746	1.10	3.34°	0.191
Post-flyby	2030	Apollo	1.16 years (423.1 days)	1.103	0.895	1.31	2.22°	0.189

Apophis also encounters the Moon at 89,600 km (55,700 mi) from the lunar surface, 16 hours after the encounter with Earth.

During the 2029 approach, Apophis's brightness will peak at magnitude 3.1, easily visible to the naked eye, with a maximum angular speed of 42° per hour. The maximum apparent angular diameter will be approximately 2 arcseconds. This is roughly equivalent to the angular diameter of Neptune from Earth. Therefore, the asteroid will be barely resolved by ground-based telescopes not equipped with adaptive optics but very well resolved by those that are. Because the approach will be so close, tidal forces are likely to alter Apophis's rotation axis, but Apophis will not approach within the Roche limit where it would be broken up by tidal forces. A partial resurfacing of the asteroid is possible, which might change its spectral class from a weathered Sq- to an unweathered Q-type.

History of close approaches of large near-Earth objects since 1908 ^{(A)}

PHA	Date	Approach distance in lunar distances			Abs. mag (H)	Diameter ^{(C)} (m)	Ref ^{(D)}
PHA	Date	Nominal^{(B)}	Minimum	Maximum	Abs. mag (H)	Diameter ^{(C)} (m)	Ref ^{(D)}
(152680) 1998 KJ9	1914-12-31	0.606	0.604	0.608	19.4	279–900	data
(458732) 2011 MD5	1918-09-17	0.911	0.909	0.913	17.9	556–1795	data
(163132) 2002 CU11	1925-08-30	0.903	0.901	0.905	18.5	443–477	data
69230 Hermes	1937-10-30	1.926	1.926	1.927	17.5	700-900	data
69230 Hermes	1942-04-26	1.651	1.651	1.651	17.5	700-900	data
2017 NM6	1959-07-12	1.89	1.846	1.934	18.8	580–1300	data
(27002) 1998 DV9	1975-01-31	1.762	1.761	1.762	18.1	507–1637	data
2002 NY40	2002-08-18	1.371	1.371	1.371	19.0	335–1082	data
(612901) 2004 XP1414	2006-07-03	1.125	1.125	1.125	19.3	292–942	data
2015 TB145	2015-10-31	1.266	1.266	1.266	20.0	620-690	data
(137108) 1999 AN10	2027-08-07	1.014	1.010	1.019	17.9	556–1793	data
(153814) 2001 WN5	2028-06-26	0.647	0.647	0.647	18.2	921–943	data
99942 Apophis	2029-04-13	0.0981	0.0963	0.1000	19.7	310–340	data
2017 MB1	2072-07-26	1.216	1.215	2.759	18.8	367–1186	data
2011 SM68	2072-10-17	1.875	1.865	1.886	19.6	254–820	data
(163132) 2002 CU_{11}	2080-08-31	1.655	1.654	1.656	18.5	443–477	data
(416801) 1998 MZ	2116-11-26	1.068	1.068	1.069	19.2	305–986	data
(153201) 2000 WO107	2140-12-01	0.634	0.631	0.637	19.3	427–593	data
(276033) 2002 AJ129	2172-02-08	1.783	1.775	1.792	18.7	385–1242	data
(290772) 2005 VC	2198-05-05	1.951	1.791	2.134	17.6	638–2061	data
^{(A)} This list includes near-Earth approaches of less than 2 lunar distances (LD) of objects with H brighter than 20.^{(B)} Nominal geocentric distance from the center of Earth to the center of the object (Earth has a radius of approximately 6,400 km).^{(C)} Diameter: estimated, theoretical mean-diameter based on H and albedo range between X and Y.^{(D)} Reference: data source from the JPL SBDB, with AU converted into LD (1 AU≈390 LD)^{(E)} Color codes: unobserved at close approach observed during close approach upcoming approaches

=== 2036 approaches ===
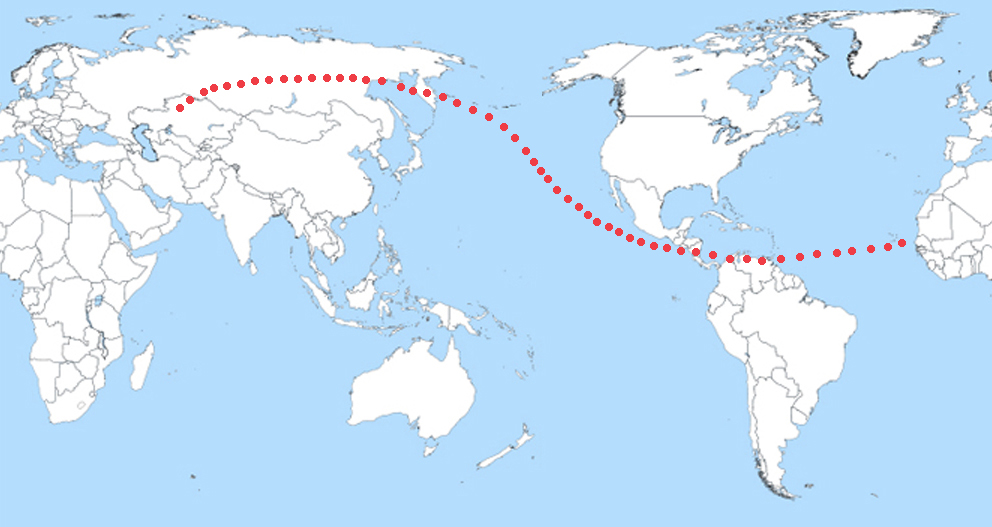
Hypothetical risk corridor for an impact on 13 April 2036

After the possibility of an impact in 2029 was ruled out, a small probability remained that during its 2029 close encounter with Earth, Apophis would pass through a gravitational keyhole estimated to be less than 1 km wide, which would have set up a future impact exactly seven years later on Easter Sunday, 13 April 2036. This possibility kept it at Level 1 on the 0 to 10 Torino impact hazard scale until August 2006, when the probability that Apophis would pass through the keyhole was determined to be negligible. Apophis's rating on the Torino scale was consequently lowered to Level 0.

In 2036, Apophis will pass the Earth at a third the distance of the Sun in both March and December. Using the 2024 orbit solution, the Earth approach on 27 March 2036, will be no closer than 0.3089 AU (46.21 million km; 28.71 million mi; 120.2 LD), but more likely about 0.3097 AU (46.33 million km; 28.79 million mi). For comparison, the planet Venus will be closer to Earth at 0.2883 AU (43.13 million km; 26.80 million mi; 112.2 LD) on 30 May 2036. (Note: On 8 January 2022 Venus was even closer to Earth at 0.2658 AU (39.76 million km; 24.71 million mi; 103.4 LD).)

=== Refinement of close approach predictions ===
Illustration of a common trend where progressively reduced uncertainty regions result in an asteroid impact probability increasing followed by a sharp decrease

Six months after discovery, and shortly after a close approach to Earth on 21 December 2004, the improved orbital estimates led to the prediction of a very close approach on 13 April 2029, by both NASA's automatic Sentry system and NEODyS, a similar automatic program run by the University of Pisa and the University of Valladolid. Subsequent observations decreased the uncertainty in Apophis's trajectory and the probability of an impact event in 2029 temporarily climbed, peaking at 2.7% (1 in 37) on 27 December 2004, when the uncertainty region had shrunk to 83,000 km. This probability, combined with its size, caused Apophis to be assessed at level 4 on the Torino scale and 1.10 on the Palermo scale (corresponding to an impact hazard over 12 times the background level), scales scientists use to represent how dangerous a given asteroid is to Earth. These are the highest values at which any object has been rated on either scale.

The chance that there would be an impact in 2029 was eliminated later in the day of 27 December 2004, as a result of a precovery image that extended the observation arc back to March 2004. The danger of a 2036 passage was lowered to level 0 on the Torino scale in August 2006. With a cumulative Palermo scale rating of −3.22, the risk of impact from Apophis is less than one thousandth the background hazard level. It is estimated that an asteroid as big or bigger coming so close to Earth happens only once in 800 years on average. Such an asteroid is expected to actually hit Earth once in about 80,000 years.

==== 2013–2015 refinement ====
The close approach in 2029 will substantially alter the object's orbit, prompting Jon Giorgini of JPL to say in 2011, "If we get radar ranging in 2013 [the next good opportunity], we should be able to predict the location of 2004 MN_{4} out to at least 2070." Apophis passed within 0.0966 AU (14.45 million km; 8.98 million mi) of Earth in 2013, allowing astronomers to refine the trajectory for future close passes. Just after the closest approach on 9 January 2013, the asteroid peaked at an apparent magnitude of about 15.6. The Goldstone radar observed Apophis during that approach from 3 January through 17 January. The Arecibo Observatory observed Apophis once it entered Arecibo's field of view after 13 February 2013. The 2013 observations reduced the probability of an impact in 2036 to 7×10^{−9}, basically ruling out any chance of a 2036 impact.

A NASA assessment as of 21 February 2013 that did not use the January and February 2013 radar measurements gave an impact probability of 2.3 in a million for 2068. As of 6 May 2013, using observations through 15 April 2013, the odds of an impact on 12 April 2068, as calculated by the JPL Sentry risk table had increased slightly to 3.9 in a million (1 in 256,000).

Incorporating early 2015 observations, the April 12, 2068, impact probability was 6.7 in a million (1 in 150,000), and the asteroid had a cumulative 9 in a million (1 in 110,000) chance of impacting Earth before 2106. After 2015, its orbit kept it near the Sun from the perspective of Earth, precluding telescopic observations. It was not further than 60 degrees from the Sun between April 2014 and December 2019.

==== 2020–2021 observations ====
Apophis in February 2021

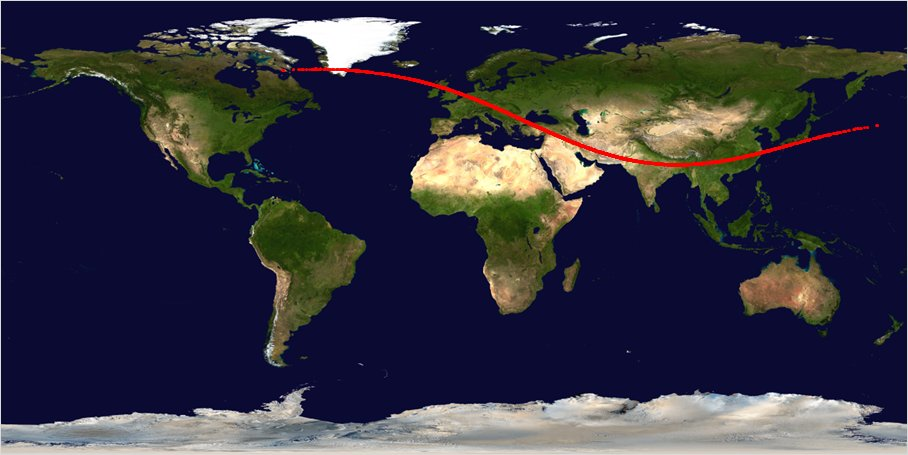
Hypothetical risk corridor for an impact on 13 April 2029, based on the 2020–21 planetary defense exercise

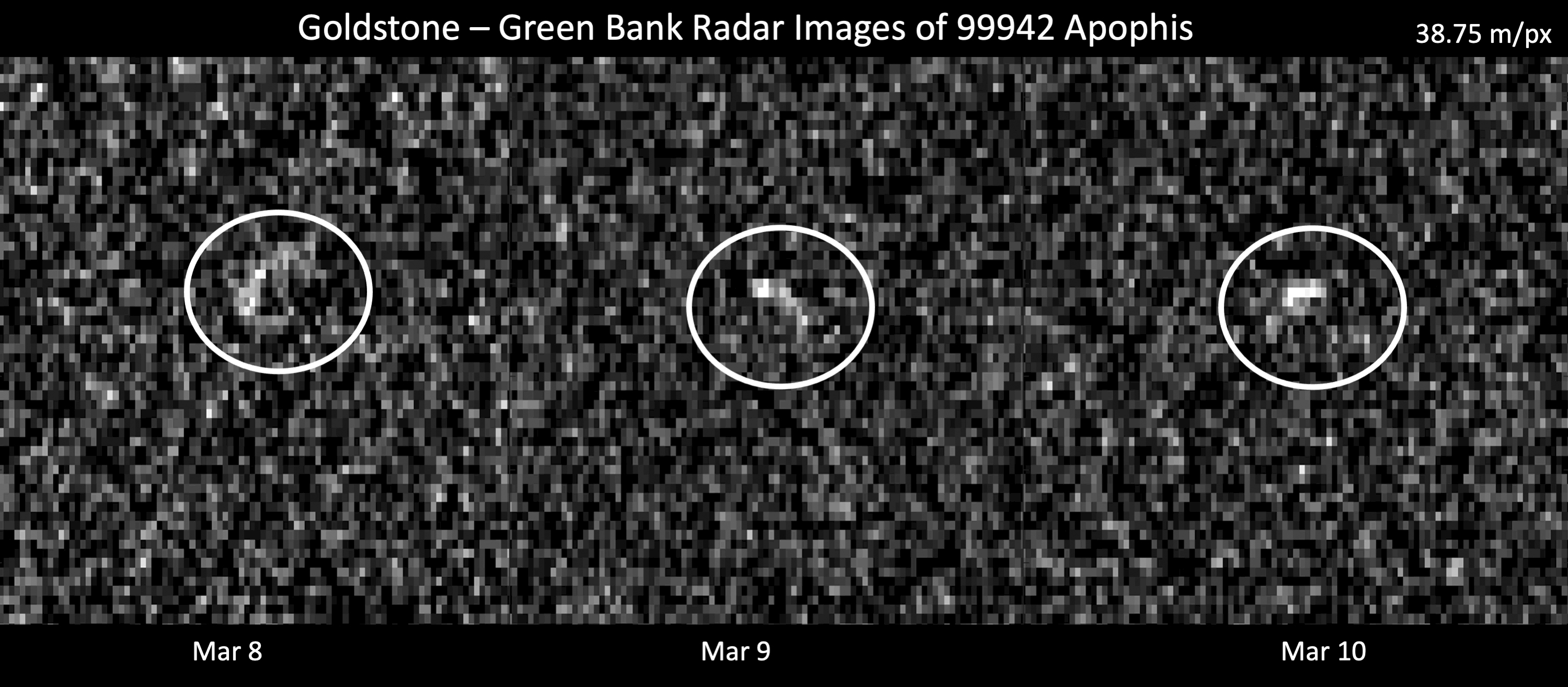
Radar observations, 8–10 March 2021

No observations of Apophis were made between January 2015 and February 2019 but observations began again in January 2020. In March 2020, astronomers David Tholen and Davide Farnocchia measured the acceleration of Apophis due to the Yarkovsky effect for the first time, significantly improving the prediction of its orbit past the 2029 flyby. Tholen and Farnocchia found that the Yarkovsky effect causes the semi-major axis to decrease by about 170 metres per year, causing an increase in ecliptic longitude that is quadratic in time. In late 2020, Apophis approached the Earth and passed 0.11265 AU (16.852 million km; 43.84 LD) from Earth on 6 March 2021, brightening to +15 mag at that time. Radar observations of Apophis were carried out at Goldstone in March 2021. The asteroid has been observed by NEOWISE (between December 2020 and April 2021) and by NEOSSat (in January 2021).

These observations showed that the impact parameter ζ (basically how far behind Earth Apophis would pass if it were not deflected by the gravitational pull of Earth) in 2029 will be about 47,363 km, less than the earlier nominal value of 47,659 km by 296 km because of the Yarkovsky effect. This means that Apophis will not hit Earth in the coming century, in particular avoiding the keyhole 212.14 km below nominal that would have led to a collision in 2068.

Apophis was the target of an observing campaign by the International Asteroid Warning Network, resulting in the collection of light curves, spectra, and astrometry. The observations were used to practice and coordinate the response to an actual impact threat. Ignoring all earlier observations, the estimated probability of an impact in 2029 reached 16 percent before going down to zero.

On 21 February 2021, Apophis was removed from the Sentry Risk Table, as an impact in the next 100 years was finally ruled out.

The 2021 apparition was the last opportunity to observe Apophis until shortly before its 2029 flyby.

Entering March 2021, six asteroids each had a more notable cumulative Palermo scale rating than Apophis, and none of those has a Torino level above 0. (Note: Of the six asteroids with a higher Palermo scale rating than Apophis at the time: (29075) 1950 DA and 101955 Bennu cannot impact within the next 100 years; 1979 XB and 2007 FT3 are lost short-arc objects that cannot be recovered with targeted observations and await serendipitous survey observations; 2000 SG344 and 2009 JF_{1} are less than 50 metres in diameter.) In the longer term, Apophis will however continue to be a threat for possibly thousands of years, until it is removed from being a potentially hazardous object, for instance by passing close to Venus or Mars.

==== Stellar occultations ====
Several occultations of bright stars (apparent magnitude 8–11) by Apophis occurred in March and April 2021. A total of five separate occultations were observed successfully, marking the first time that an asteroid as small as Apophis was observed using the occultation method (beating the previous record set in 2019 by asteroid 3200 Phaethon, which is more than ten times the size of Apophis).

The first event, on 7 March, was successfully observed from the United States by multiple observers. The next potential occultation, which occurred on 11 March, was predicted to be visible from central Europe, but was not observed, mainly because of bad weather (two negative observations were recorded from Greece). Another occultation occurred on 22 March, but larger-than-expected residuals in the 7 March data had caused the majority of observers to be deployed outside of the actual path for the occultation, and it was observed only by a single observer from the United States, amateur astronomer Roger Venable. This single detection then allowed the prediction of several more events that would have been unobservable otherwise, including an occultation on 4 April, which was observed from New Mexico, again by Venable, alongside others. Two more occultations, observable on 10 and 11 April from Japan and New Mexico, respectively, were seen by several observers each. The occultation measurements helped refine the asteroid's size and orbit.

=== History of impact estimates ===
Date	Time	Status
2004-12-23		The original NASA report mentioned impact chances of "around 1 in 300" in 2029, which was widely reported in the media. The actual NASA estimates at the time were 1 in 233; these resulted in a Torino scale rating of 2, the first time any asteroid had received a rating above 1.
2004-12-23		Later that day, based on a total of 64 observations, the estimates were changed to 1 in 62 (1.6%), resulting in an update to the initial report and an upgrade to a Torino scale rating of 4.
2004-12-25		The chances were first reported as 1 in 42 (2.4%) and later that day (based on 101 observations) as 1 in 45 (2.2%). At the same time, the asteroid's estimated diameter was lowered from 440 m to 390 m and its mass from 1.2×10^{11} kg to 8.3×10^{10} kg.
2004-12-26		Based on a total of 169 observations, the impact probability was still estimated as 1 in 45 (2.2%), the estimates for diameter and mass were lowered to 380 m and 7.5×10^{10} kg, respectively.
2004-12-27		Based on a total of 176 observations with an observation arc of 190 days, the impact probability was raised to 1 in 37 (2.7%) with a line of variation (LOV) of only 83,000 km; diameter was increased to 390 m, and mass to 7.9×10^{10} kg.
2004-12-27		Later that afternoon, a precovery increased the span of observations to 287 days, which eliminated the 2029 impact threat. The cumulative impact probability was estimated to be around 0.004%, a risk lower than that of asteroid 2004 VD17, which once again became (temporarily) the greatest-risk object. A 2053 approach to Earth still posed a minor risk of impact, and Apophis was still rated at level one on the Torino scale for this orbit.
2004-12-28	12:23 GMT	Based on a total of 139 observations, a value of one was given on the Torino scale for 2044-04-13.29 and 2053-04-13.51.
2004-12-29	01:10 GMT	The only pass rated 1 on the Torino scale was for 2053-04-13.51 based on 139 observations spanning 287.71 days (2004-Mar-15.1104 to 2004-Dec-27.8243).
2004-12-29	19:18 GMT	This was still the case based upon 147 observations spanning 288.92 days (2004-Mar-15.1104 to 2004-Dec-29.02821), though the close encounters were changed and reduced to 4 in total.
2004-12-30	13:46 GMT	No passes were rated above 0, based upon 157 observations spanning 289.33 days (2004-Mar-15.1104 to 2004-Dec-29.44434). The most dangerous pass was rated at 1 in 7,143,000.
2004-12-30	22:34 GMT	157 observations spanning 289.33 days (2004-Mar-15.1104 to 2004-Dec-29.44434). One pass at 1 (Torino scale) 3 other passes.
2005-01-02	03:57 GMT	Observations spanning 290.97 days (2004-Mar-15.1104 to 2004-Dec-31.07992) One pass at 1 (Torino scale) 19 other passes.
2005-01-03	14:49 GMT	Observations spanning 292.72 days (2004-Mar-15.1104 to 2005-Jan-01.82787) One pass at 1 (Torino scale) 15 other passes.
2005–01		Extremely precise radar observations at Arecibo Observatory refine the orbit further and show that the April 2029 close approach will occur at only 5.7 Earth radii, approximately one-half the distance previously estimated.
2005-02-06		Apophis estimated to have a 1-in-13,000 chance of impacting in April 2036.
2005-08-07		Radar observation refines the orbit further and eliminates the possibility of an impact in 2035. Only the pass in 2036 remains at Torino scale 1 (with a 1-in-5,560 chance of impact).
2005–10		It is predicted that Apophis will pass just below the altitude of geosynchronous satellites, which are at approximately 35,900 kilometres (22,300 mi).
2006-05-06		Radar observation at Arecibo Observatory slightly lowered the Palermo scale rating, but the pass in 2036 remained at Torino scale 1 despite the impact probability dropping by a factor of four.
2006-08-05		Additional observations through 2006 resulted in Apophis being lowered to Torino scale 0. (The impact probability was assessed as 1 in 45,000.)
2008-04		News outlets carry the story that 13-year-old German student Nico Marquardt found a probability of 1 in 450 for a 2036 impact. This estimate was allegedly acknowledged by ESA and NASA but in an official statement, NASA denied they had made an error. The release went on to explain that since the angle of Apophis's approach to the Earth's equator means the asteroid will not travel through the belt of current equatorial geosynchronous satellites, there is currently no risk of collision; and the effect on Apophis's orbit of any such impact would be insignificant.
2009-04-29		An animation is released that shows how unmeasured physical parameters of Apophis bias the entire statistical uncertainty region. If Apophis is a retrograde rotator on the small, less-massive end of what is possible, it will be several hundred kilometres further ahead in 2029, resulting in a different change to its orbit, and then the measurement uncertainty region for 2036 will get pushed back such that the center of the distribution encounters Earth's orbit. This would result in an impact probability much higher than computed with the Standard Dynamical Model. Conversely, if Apophis is a small, less-massive prograde rotator, it arrives a bit later on April 13, 2029, and the uncertainty region for 2036 is advanced along the orbit. Only the remote tails of the probability distribution could encounter Earth, producing a negligible impact probability for 2036.
2009-10-07		Refinements to the precovery images of Apophis by the University of Hawaii's Institute for Astronomy, the 90-inch Bok Telescope, and the Arecibo Observatory have generated a refined path that reduces the odds of an 13 April 2036 impact to about 1 in 250,000.
		Criticism of older published impact probabilities rests on the fact that important physical parameters such as mass and spin that affect its precise trajectory had not yet been accurately measured and hence there were no associated probability distributions. The Standard Dynamical Model used for making predictions simplifies calculations by assuming Earth is a point mass. This could lead to a prediction error of up to 2.9 Earth radii for the 2036 approach, necessitating the consideration of Earth's oblateness during the 2029 passage for accurately forecasting the potential impact. Additional factors that could greatly influence the predicted motion in ways that depend on unknown details, were the spin of the asteroid, its precise mass, the way it reflects and absorbs sunlight, radiates heat, and the gravitational pull of other asteroids passing nearby. Small uncertainties in the masses and positions of the planets and Sun could cause up to 23 Earth radii of prediction error for Apophis by 2036.
2013-01		A statistical impact risk analysis of the data up to this point calculated that the odds of the 2036 impact at 7.07 in a billion, effectively ruling it out. The same study looked at the odds of an impact in 2068, which were calculated at 2.27 in a million. First appearance of Sentry virtual impactors that also include mid-October dates.
2013-01-09		The European Space Agency (ESA) announced that the Herschel Space Observatory made new thermal infrared observations of the asteroid as it approached Earth. The initial data shows the asteroid to be bigger than first estimated because it is now expected to be less reflective than originally thought. The Herschel Space Observatory observations increased the diameter estimate by 20% from 270 to 325 metres, which translates into a 75% increase in the estimates of the asteroid's volume or mass. Goldstone single-pixel observations of Apophis have ruled out the potential 2036 Earth impact. Apophis will then come no closer than about 23 million kilometres (14×10^{6} mi)—and more likely miss us by something closer to 56 million kilometres (35×10^{6} mi). The radar astrometry is more precise than was expected.
2014-10-08		The Sentry Risk Table assessed Apophis as having a 6.7-in-a-million (1-in-150,000) chance of impacting Earth in 2068, and a 9-in-a-million (1-in-110,000) cumulative chance of impacting Earth by 2105.
2020-03		By taking observations of Apophis with the Subaru Telescope in January and March 2020, as well as remeasuring older observations using the new Gaia DR2 star catalog, astronomers positively detect the Yarkovsky effect on Apophis. The semi-major axis thereby decreases by about 170 metres per year. The Yarkovsky effect is the main source of uncertainty in impact probability estimates for this asteroid.
2021-02-21		Apophis was removed from the Sentry Risk Table, as an impact in the next 100 years was finally ruled out.
2021-03-15	10:44	JPL solution #207 using observations in 2020 and 2021 reduced the 3-sigma uncertainty region in the 2029 approach distance from ±700 km to about ±3 km. The June 2021 solution showed the Earth approach on 27 March 2036 will be no closer than 0.30889 AU (46.209 million km; 28.713 million mi; 120.21 LD).
2024-06-25		JPL solution #220 includes observations through 2022-April-09.

== Possible impact effects ==
As of 2021, the Sentry Risk Table estimated that Apophis would impact Earth with kinetic energy equivalent to 1,200 MT or megatons of TNT. In comparison, the energy released by the eruption of Krakatoa was 200 MT, the total global nuclear arsenal has an energy equivalent to 1,460 MT, and the Chicxulub impact and extinction event had an estimated energy of 100,000,000 MT (100 teratons). See TNT equivalent examples for an extended table of comparable energies.

The exact effects of an impact would vary based on the asteroid's composition, and the location and angle of impact. Any impact of Apophis would be extremely detrimental to an area of thousands of square kilometres, but would be unlikely to have long-lasting global effects, such as the initiation of an impact winter. Assuming Apophis is a 370-metre-wide (1,210 ft) stony asteroid with a density of 3,000 kg/m^{3}, if it were to impact into sedimentary rock, Apophis would create a 5.1-kilometre (17,000 ft) wide impact crater.

=== Expired 2036 path of risk ===
In July 2005, former Apollo astronaut Rusty Schweickart, as chairman of the B612 Foundation, formally asked NASA to investigate the possibility that the asteroid's post-2029 orbit could be in orbital resonance with Earth, which would increase the probability of future impacts. Schweickart also asked NASA to investigate whether a transponder should be placed on the asteroid to enable more accurate tracking of how its orbit is affected by the Yarkovsky effect.

In 2008, the B612 Foundation made estimates of Apophis's path if a 2036 Earth impact were to occur, as part of an effort to develop viable deflection strategies. The result was a narrow corridor a few kilometres wide, called the "path of risk", extending across southern Russia, across the north Pacific (relatively close to the coastlines of California and Mexico), then right between Nicaragua and Costa Rica, crossing northern Colombia and Venezuela, ending in the Atlantic, just before reaching Africa. Using the computer simulation tool NEOSim, it was estimated that the hypothetical impact of Apophis in countries such as Colombia and Venezuela, which were in the path of risk, could have had more than 10 million casualties. A deep-water impact in the Atlantic or Pacific oceans would produce an incoherent short-range tsunami with a potential destructive radius (inundation height of >2 m) of roughly 1,000 kilometres (620 mi) for most of North America, Brazil and Africa, 3,000 km (1,900 mi) for Japan and 4,500 km (2,800 mi) for some areas in Hawaii.

== Exploration ==
=== NASA ===
==== OSIRIS-APEX post-Earth-encounter rendezvous ====
The OSIRIS-REx spacecraft returned a sample of Bennu to Earth on 24 September 2023. After ejecting the sample canister, the spacecraft can use its remaining fuel to target another body during an extended mission. Apophis is the only asteroid which the spacecraft could reach for a long-duration rendezvous, rather than a brief flyby. In April 2022, the extension was approved, and OSIRIS-REx will perform a rendezvous with Apophis in April 2029, a few days after the close approach to Earth. It will study the asteroid for 18 months and perform a maneuver similar to the one it made during sample collection at Bennu, by approaching the surface and firing its thrusters. This will expose the asteroid's subsurface and allow mission scientists to learn more about the asteroid's material properties. For its Apophis mission after the sample return, OSIRIS-REx was renamed OSIRIS-APEX (short for OSIRIS-Apophis Explorer).

=== Planetary Society ===
In 2007, the Planetary Society, a California-based space advocacy group, organised a $50,000 competition to design an uncrewed space probe that would 'shadow' Apophis for almost a year, taking measurements that would "determine whether it will impact Earth, thus helping governments decide whether to mount a deflection mission to alter its orbit". The society received 37 entries from 20 countries on 6 continents.

The commercial competition was won by a design called Foresight created by SpaceWorks Engineering. SpaceWorks proposed a simple orbiter with only two instruments and a radio beacon at a cost of ~US$140 million, launched aboard a Minotaur IV between 2012 and 2014. Pharos, the winning student entry, would be an orbiter with four science instruments that would rendezvous with and track Apophis. The spacecraft would have been launched in April or May 2013 aboard a Delta II 7925 rocket, to arrive at the asteroid after a cruise of 233 to 309 days. It would have carried four additional BUOI probes that would have impacted the surface of Apophis over the course of two weeks.

=== ESA ===
==== Don Quijote ====
Apophis is one of two asteroids that were considered by the European Space Agency as the target of its Don Quijote mission concept to study the effects of impacting an asteroid.

==== Ramses ====
Apophis is the target of the European Space Agency's approved Ramses (Rapid Apophis Mission for Security and Safety) mission, with a launch in April or May 2028 and rendezvous with the asteroid in February 2029.

==== Satis ====
In parallel with Ramses, ESA is also considering a stand-alone CubeSat mission called Satis.

=== JAXA ===
==== DESTINY+ ====
The DESTINY+ spacecraft from JAXA in collaboration with DLR will be launched as a rideshare with Ramses. Its primary target is the asteroid (3200) Phaethon, but it will perform a flyby of Apophis as a rehearsal for the primary mission.

=== CNSA ===
China had planned an encounter with Apophis in 2022, several years prior to the close approach in 2029. This mission, now known as Tianwen-2, would have included exploration and close study of three asteroids including an extended encounter with Apophis for close observation, and land on the asteroid 1996 FG_{3} to conduct in situ sampling analysis on the surface. The spacecraft launched on 28 May 2025, with a different set of targets.

== Proposed deflection strategies ==
Studies by NASA, ESA, and various research groups in addition to the Planetary Society contest teams, have described a number of proposals for deflecting Apophis or similar objects, including gravitational tractor, kinetic impact, and nuclear bomb methods.

On 30 December 2009, Anatoly Perminov, the director of the Russian Federal Space Agency, said in an interview that Roscosmos will also study designs for a possible deflection mission to Apophis.

On 16 August 2011, researchers at China's Tsinghua University proposed launching a mission to knock Apophis onto a safer course using an impactor spacecraft in a retrograde orbit, steered and powered by a solar sail. Instead of moving the asteroid on its potential resonant return to Earth, Shengping Gong and his team believe the secret is shifting the asteroid away from entering the gravitational keyhole in the first place.

In October 2022, a method was proposed for mapping the interior of an asteroid of concern, such as 99942 Apophis, in order to determine the optimal location for a kinetic impact.

== Popular culture ==
In Id Software's video game Rage, the backstory involves the asteroid colliding with Earth on 23 August 2029. The asteroid almost wipes out the human race and ushers in a post-apocalyptic age.

In music, the asteroid Apophis is referred to in the song "The Profit of Doom" by gothic metal band Type O Negative on their 2007 album Dead Again. The lyrics refer to the asteroid 99942 Apophis, which at that time was considered to have a possibility of hitting Earth on Friday, 13 April 2029.

== See also ==
- Asteroid capture
- Asteroid impact prediction
- Asteroid Redirect Mission
- Earth-grazing fireball
- "Fail Safe", the Stargate SG-1 episode in which a civilization-destroying asteroid is discovered on a direct collision course with Earth
- List of impact structures on Earth
- NEO Surveyor
- List of predicted asteroid impacts on Earth

== Notes ==
Preceded by (153814) 2001 WN5	Large NEO Earth close approach (inside the orbit of the Moon); April 13, 2029	Succeeded by 2012 UE34
