= Ramses (spacecraft) =

Future mission to asteroid 99942 Apophis

- Mission type: Asteroid probe
- Operator: ESA, JAXA
- Website: www.ramsesmission.space

Start of mission
- Launch date: 2028
- Rocket: H3
- ESA insignia Space Safety Programme

Ramses (Rapid Apophis Mission for Space Safety) is a future European-Japanese planetary defense mission to the near-Earth asteroid (99942) Apophis, led by the European Space Agency (ESA). It is expected to be launched between mid April and mid May 2028 and to arrive at Apophis in February 2029 before its closest approach to Earth. It will conduct measurements of the asteroid's properties before and during the Earth flyby to study its response to the close encounter with the planet. At the asteroid, Ramses will deploy two smaller CubeSats. Ramses will leverage much of the technology developed for the Hera mission.

== Timeline ==
=== Development ===
In July 2024, ESA's Space Safety Programme has received permission to begin preparatory work for Ramses. The project has been awarded 1.5 million euros for the preparations and in October 2024, ESA signed a contract with OHB Italia SpA for preliminary work on the mission. ESA also unveiled the official mission patch. In July 2024, India expressed interest on developing an instrument for Ramses. In 2024, DLR proposed including a mini-rover in the Ramses mission: MASCOT3 (or BASTET), similar to the MASCOT rover which flew on Hayabusa2.

In March 2025, ESA has selected the first of two CubeSats (later named Farinella) to fly onboard Ramses. The mission team revealed that they were considering whether the second CubeSat could be a lander that would touch down on Apophis. In April 2025, ESA has selected the Spanish company Emxys to build the second CubeSat (later named Don Quijote), indeed intended to land on Apophis, and GomSpace (Denmark) to provide system engineering support for the lander CubeSat project.

In August 2025, JAXA has made an official funding request to the Government of Japan to participate in the mission. JAXA plans to contribute the probe's solar arrays, infrared imager, and a rideshare launch on the H3 rocket. On the European side, the funding decision was expected to be made in late 2025 at the ESA ministerial council. Speaking at EPSC-DPS meeting in September 2025, Ramses Project Manager Paolo Martino confirmed that the project was fully on schedule. The Preliminary Design Review had been completed previous year, and the Critical Design Review was expected in November 2025. At the ministerial council in late November 2025, ESA member states approved funding for the mission, together with a substantial increase in the budget of the Space Safety Programme.

In December 2025, OHB Italia signed an agreement with the Belgian company SPACEBEL, already involved in Hera, which will provide the core onboard software for Ramses. On 6 February 2026, Ramses concluded its Critical Design Review. On 10 February 2026 at ESTEC, ESA signed a contract worth €81.2 million with OHB Italia to begin the construction, assembly, and testing phase of the mission. ESA also signed a contract worth €8.2 million with Tyvak International for the construction of the orbiter CubeSat Farinella. On 12 February, OHB Italia signed a contract with the Czech company G.L.Electronic, that will supply electrical cables and related hardware for Ramses. G.L.Electronic also contributed to the Hera mission. In May 2026 ESA and JAXA signed a cooperation agreement detailing the Japanese contribution to the Ramses mission. The two agencies also signed a more general memorandum of cooperation on planetary defence. In early July 2026, ESA signed a contract with the Spanish company EMXYS to provide the Don Quijote lander CubeSat.

=== Construction ===
In June 2026, the central tube of Ramses was completed in Bremen. On 21 September 2026, the spacecraft's Core Module, including the mission's on-board computer, was switched on for the first time in a cleanroom at OHB Italia's facility in Milan. Meanwhile, the Propulsion Module was being integrated at ArianeGroup's facility in Lampoldshausen.

== Mission profile ==
Ramses will launch on a Japanese H3 rocket from Tanegashima Space Center in April 2028 together with another asteroid probe, the JAXA's DESTINY+ whose mission is to explore the active asteroid Phaethon. This will allow DESTINY+ to perform a flyby of Apophis before Ramses, taking the first space images of the asteroid in preparation of the arrival of Ramses.

Ramses will fly on a 10-months direct transfer trajectory and rendezvous with Apophis no later than 1 March 2029. Both before and after the closest approach to Earth, Ramses will perform global imaging of the asteroid's surface at 10 cm resolution and targeted imaging of selected areas at 1.5 cm resolution. During the Earth flyby, Ramses will keep a safe distance of 5 km from the asteroid while performing observations with high temporal resolution of 1 picture per minute.

The close approach of the asteroid Apophis to the Earth and Moon on Friday, April 13, 2029

The white bar indicates uncertainty in the range of possible positions as of the 2007 observation data. The 2029 uncertainty region is now down to ±700 km.

Apophis orbit diverted by Earth's gravity – visualisation by ESA's "NEO Toolkit"

Animation of Ramses's proposed trajectory from April 2028 to March 2030. Legend: Ramses · Earth · 99942 Apophis · Sun

== Spacecraft ==
The Ramses spacecraft design is mostly based on Hera. However, the different mission profile of Ramses led to various design changes, e.g. smaller solar arrays and antennas due to closer distance to Sun and Earth during critical operations, as well as changes to tank volume and dry mass due to an increased delta-V demand.

The spacecraft's body (integrated at ESTEC) is composed of a U-shaped Core Module (integrated in Milan) containing the electronics and a Propulsion Module (integrated in Lampoldshausen) containing propellant tanks. The spacecraft's central tube (built in Bremen), part of the Propulsion Module and made of carbon fibre reinforced polymer, measures 1.55 m in height and weighs just under 40 kg. The spacecraft's solar arrays are provided by JAXA.

== CubeSats ==
=== Farinella ===
The first selected CubeSat, named Farinella after the Italian planetary scientist Paolo Farinella, will be built by Tyvak International (Italy), a company that developed the Milani CubeSat for the Hera mission. The small spacecraft will combine the dust analyser of Milani with the low-frequency radar of Juventas, another CubeSat of Hera. The dust analyser, called VISTA, will study material released from the surface of Apophis and the radar will investigate the asteroid's internal structure.

=== Don Quijote ===
The second selected CubeSat, Don Quijote (not to be confused with Don Quijote, an undeveloped concept for asteroid mission), being developed by a consortium led by Emxys (Spain), will attempt landing on Apophis. Its main task will be to provide high resolution imagery of the asteroid's surface from a distance of just a few kilometres. If the landing is successful, Don Quijote will also measure the asteroid's seismic activity and magnetic interactions during its exceptionally close flyby of Earth. Emxys previously contributed to the GRASS gravimeter on Hera's Juventas CubeSat.

== Science instruments ==
The Ramses spacecraft itself will be equipped with eight scientific instruments including two Asteroid Framing Cameras and a Radio Science experiment as in Hera, while other will be mounted on the two accompanying CubeSats, Farinella and Don Quijote.

=== Instruments on Ramses ===
==== AFC ====
Like Hera, Ramses will be equipped with two Asteroid Framing Cameras (AFC) for both scientific and navigational imaging. AFC have a broad field of view suitable for capturing the entire asteroid at relatively low resolution and will be complemented by the CHANCES instrument with higher resolution. The AFC instruments were developed by Jena-Optronik, a former subsidiary of Jenoptik (now part of Airbus Defence and Space).

==== CHANCES ====
The Color High-resolution Apophis Narrow-angle CamEra System (CHANCES) is an imaging instrument capable of capturing the asteroid surface reflectance at different wavelengths to study its physical properties and mineralogical composition. Its role is to record the subtle changes on the asteroid caused by Earth's gravity during the flyby. CHANCES is being developed by the University of Bern.

==== HAMLET ====
The HyperScout for Apophis Multispectral Exploration and Taxonomy (HAMLET) is a hyperspectral camera for detailed surface characterization in two spectral channels (650-960 nm and 960-1500 nm). The camera is designed to map the asteroid's mineral and elemental composition as well as various physical properties, including space weathering effects before and after the flyby of Earth. HAMLET is based on the design of the HyperScout-H imager on Hera. The instrument is being developed by Cosine Italia with scientific support from Istituto di Astrofisica e Planetologia Spaziali in Rome and Osservatorio Astronomico di Capodimonte in Naples.

==== PALT ====
The Planetary ALTimeter (PALT) is a LIDAR instrument for measuring the distance to the asteroid using laser with a wavelength of 1.5 μm. Its accuracy is 0.5 m. It can be used both for scientific investigations and for navigation.

==== RPS ====
The RAMSES Plasma Spectrometer (RPS) is a high-resolution spectrometer for measuring charged particles. Its role is to study the plasma environment around Apophis—especially during the pass through Earth's outer radiation belt—and the plasma's interactions with the asteroid's surface. It may also detect the lifting of regolith from the asteroid's surface. RPS is based on a spare model of the Jovian Electron and Ion Sensor, part of the Particle Environment Package on ESA's JUICE spacecraft. It was developed by the Max Planck Institute for Solar System Research, Göttingen.

==== RSE ====
Like Hera, Ramses is expected to perform Radio Science Experiments (RSE) aiming to investigate the asteroid's mass, gravity field, and spin. RSE will combine optical navigation data with radiometric measurements using radio links between Ramses and Earth, as well as Ramses and the two CubeSats.

==== TIRI ====
The Japanese multi-band thermal infrared imager TIRI also flew aboard the Hera spacecraft. Its role is to investigate the thermophysical properties and composition of the asteroid's surface. It uses a wide band (8–14 μm) for thermographic imaging and six narrow bands (7–14 μm) for compositional mapping. TIRI was developed by JAXA as a successor of the single band infrared imager TIR on the Hayabusa2 spacecraft.

=== Instruments on Farinella ===
==== ARA ====
The Farinella CubeSat will carry a low-frequency radar operating in monostatic mode derived from the JuRa instrument on Juventas, one of Hera's CubeSats. The instrument is being developed by Institut de Planétologie et d'Astrophysique, Université Grenoble-Alpes. The radar's miniature antennas are being developed by the Polish company Astronika.

==== VISTA ====
The Volatile In-Situ Thermogravimeter Analyser (VISTA), flying aboard Farinella, will analyze dust particles and volatiles in order to monitor various mobilization events of materials from the asteroid's surface caused by tidal forces, rotation, micrometeorite impacts, and spacecraft manoeuvres. It is based on the VISTA instrument of Hera.

==== Horus ====
Horus is an optical instrument operating aboard the Farinella CubeSat, developed by Tyvak International and Politecnico di Milano. Serving a dual purpose as both a high-resolution scientific imager and a navigation camera, Horus is designed to capture close-up imagery from the CubeSat's low-altitude orbit around the asteroid Apophis.

=== Instruments on Don Quijote ===
==== MARIE ====
The MARIE (Magnetosphere-induced Apophis Response Investigation Experiment) magnetometer, flying aboard the Don Quijote lander, will study the interactions between Apophis and Earth's magnetic field, as well as the distribution of possible magnetisation on the asteroid itself during the lander's approach, landing, and surface operations. The Ramses mission is an earlier-than-expected opportunity for in-space testing of the miniaturized magnetometer technology developed for small satellites as part of the German government's space strategy of 2023.

==== GRASS II ====
The GRASS (Gravimeter for Small Solar System Objects) gravimeter, developed through a collaboration between the Royal Observatory of Belgium (ROB) and EMXYS, will fly aboard the Don Quijote lander. Following landing on Apophis, it will perform direct in situ measurements of the local gravitational acceleration. These measurements will help constrain the asteroid's mass distribution, internal structure and mechanical properties, complementing the observations from the SIA seismometer and the other instruments aboard the Ramses CubeSats.

==== SIA ====
The SIA (Seismic Instrument for Asteroids) seismometer, developed by ISAE-SUPAERO, will fly aboard the Don Quijote lander. If the landing is successful, SIA will observe how the asteroid's internal structure reacts to the tidal forces during the Earth flyby. It will complement the observations by the low-frequency radar instrument on Farinella.

== See also ==
- List of ESA programmes and missions
