= Nico Marquardt =

German politician

Member of the Potsdam Parliament
- Incumbent
- Assumed office 25 May 2014

Personal details
- Born: 1994 (age 31–32) Potsdam, Germany
- Party: Social Democratic Party of Germany
- Education: Bachelor in Digital Business and Master in Public Health
- Occupation: Politician, non-executive director, consultant
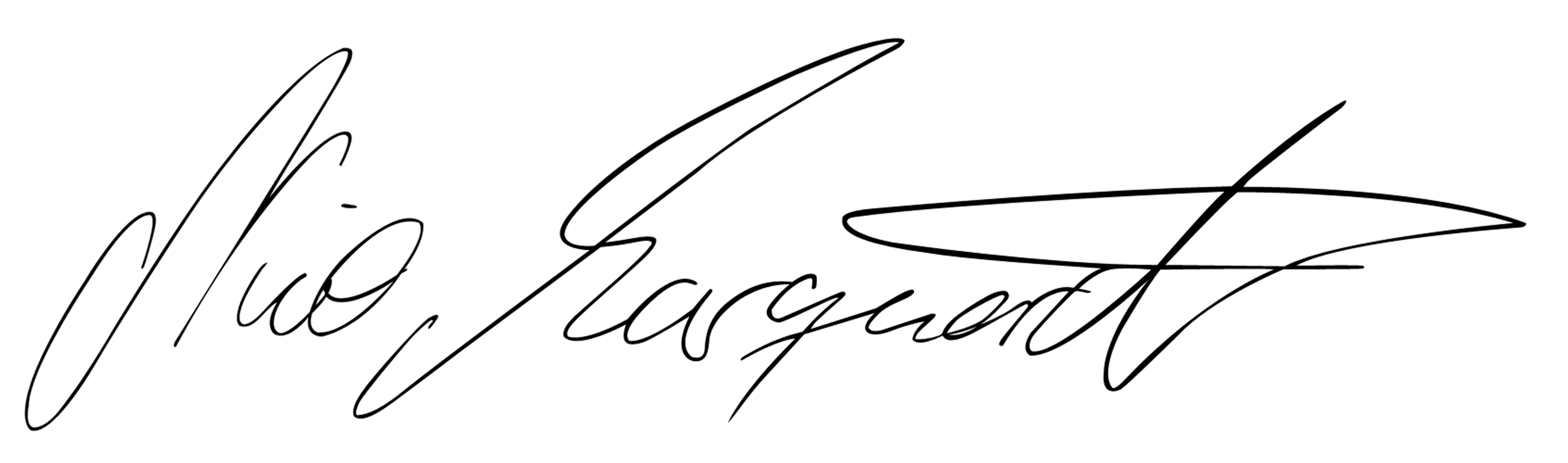
- Signature
- Website: Official website

Nico Marquardt (born 1994) is a German politician, non-executive director and consultant. He currently serves as the parliamentary leader of the SPD in Potsdam. At the age of 13, he became internationally known with his astronomy research work about the near-Earth asteroid 99942 Apophis.

== Life ==
=== Early life ===
Nico Marquardt was born in Potsdam, Germany as the son of a Oberstleutnant (commissioned officer) and nurse.

=== Education ===
He holds a Bachelor's degree in Digital Business, a Master's degree in Public Health and is currently pursuing a PhD in Global Health with a focus on the application of artificial intelligence to improve maternal health in low-resource settings.

=== Astronomy ===
In April 2008, at the age of 13, he took part in the competition Jugend forscht with his research paper The Killer Asteroid 99942 Apophis, in which he calculated the probability for the asteroid Apophis to collide with a geosynchronous satellite and the consequences of this event to the likelihood of an Earth collision. On the day of the award Marquardt was interviewed by German newspaper Bild which published an article saying that Marquardt found a 100-times higher probability of an Earth-collision in the year 2036 than what NASA gave at the time. Afterwards, nearly all international press reported the story of the boy who "corrected" NASA.

The astronomer Fred Watson even said "Marquardt has done a marvellous job. A hundred years ago people used logarithms and hand-calculators and slide rules to work out asteroid orbits. But it says a lot for the world that we live in that a 13 year-old schoolboy can download the right software to do the job and actually find errors in NASA's work. It is quite extraordinary." NASA denied that its figure was wrong.

=== Career ===
Since 2013 Marquardt is CEO of the consulting firm Rabbit. As of August 2014 Marquardt has been elected as non-executive director of the local energy and water service company EWP and also as member of the supervisory board for the hospital Forst as well as the hospital Ernst von Bergmann. Marquardt co-hosts the podcast Exponential Talk, where he discusses the implications of digital transformation and accelerating change with personalities, including Nobel laureates such as Klaus Hasselmann.

== Political career ==
During his final year in high school, Marquardt ran for office in Potsdam as a candidate for the Social Democratic Party of Germany and won. This made Marquardt the youngest elected politician of any state capital in Germany. In November 2015 Marquardt filed criminal charges against the far-right political party Der Dritte Weg (German for "The Third Path") in Germany on grounds of incitement to hatred. In the 2019 elections, he was re-elected and has since served as the deputy chairman of the Committee of Participation, Transparency and Digitalisation and as a member of the Culture Committee. Marquardt has been the chairman of the Digitalization Council of the state capital Potsdam since 2022. Since 2024 Marquardt is parliamentary leader of the SPD in Potsdam.

== Awards ==
Marquardt won the first prize at the German competition Jugend forscht, got the Special Honor from the Federal Ministry of Education and Research and the Special Award of the German Aerospace Center.
