= David Rubincam =

American geophysicist (born 1947)

David P. Rubincam
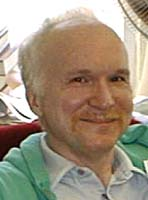
- Born: David Perry Rubincam; February 27, 1947 (age 79)
- Education: University of Maryland, College Park (Ph.D., 1973)
- Known for: YORP effect
- Scientific career
- Fields: Geophysics, Celestial mechanics
- Workplaces: NASA Goddard Space Flight Center

David Perry Rubincam (born February 27, 1947) is an American geophysicist known for his work in solid-earth geophysics, planetary geodynamics, and celestial mechanics. He worked at NASA’s Goddard Space Flight Center (GSFC) from 1978 until his retirement in 2018, where he made significant contributions to understanding non-gravitational effects on the motion of planetary bodies. In 2000, Rubincam coined the term Yarkovsky–O'Keefe–Radzievskii–Paddack effect (YORP effect) to describe how sunlight can alter the spin rates and orientations of small celestial bodies. The main-belt asteroid 9921 Rubincam was named in his honor.

== Education and career ==
Rubincam earned his Ph.D. in physics from the University of Maryland, College Park in 1973. He joined NASA Goddard in 1978 as a civilian scientist and spent his career in the Laboratory for Terrestrial Physics. His early research focused on Earth’s rotation, tidal friction, and geodynamics, including studies using satellites such as LAGEOS.

In later decades, Rubincam shifted his focus to the influence of thermal forces on small bodies. He was the first to analyze how thermal radiation recoil could affect an asteroid’s spin, leading him to introduce the term “YORP” in a 2000 publication. He also contributed to understanding long-term planetary climate oscillations, including Milankovitch cycles.

In 2006, he co-authored a widely cited review on the Yarkovsky effect and YORP, summarizing their implications for asteroid dynamics. Rubincam retired from NASA in 2018.

== Honors and memberships ==
Rubincam is a member of the American Geophysical Union and the American Association for the Advancement of Science.

In 2015, the International Astronomical Union named the asteroid 9921 Rubincam after him for his work on radiation recoil effects on asteroids.

== Personal life ==
Rubincam is the son of noted genealogist Milton Rubincam. He resides in Lanham, Maryland.

== Selected publications ==
- Rubincam, D. P. (2000). "Radiative spin-up and spin-down of small asteroids." Icarus, 148(1), 2–11. doi:10.1006/icar.2000.6485.
- Bottke, W. F., Vokrouhlický, D., Rubincam, D. P., & Nesvorný, D. (2006). "The Yarkovsky and YORP effects: Implications for asteroid dynamics." Annual Review of Earth and Planetary Sciences, 34, 157–191. doi:10.1146/annurev.earth.34.031405.125154.
- Rubincam, D. P. (2004). "Black body temperature, orbital elements, the Milankovitch precession index, and the Seversmith psychroterms." Theoretical and Applied Climatology, 79(1–2), 111–131. doi:10.1007/s00704-004-0056-5.
