= John A. O'Keefe (astronomer) =

American astronomer (1916–2000)

John Aloysius O'Keefe III (October 13, 1916 – September 8, 2000) was an expert in planetary science and astrogeology with the National Aeronautics and Space Administration (NASA) from 1958 to 1995.

He and his co-authors, Ann Eckels and Ken Squires, are credited with the discovery that the Earth had a significant third degree zonal spherical harmonic in its gravitational field using U.S. Vanguard 1 satellite data collected in the late 1950s. The Earth's pear shape as it was known became front-page news and was even the subject of a "Peanuts" cartoon. For that, he is credited as the "father of space geodesy".

He was the first to propose the idea of a scanning microscope in 1956 and he is the co-discoverer of the YORP effect (short for Yarkovsky-O’Keefe-Radzievskii-Paddock effect), an effect resulting from sunlight which causes a small celestial body such as an asteroid or meteor to spin up or down.

== Biography ==
=== Early years ===
O'Keefe was born in Lynn, Massachusetts, on October 13, 1916. He was the oldest of four children of Edward Scott O'Keefe and Ruth Evans. O'Keefe spent his last two years of high school at Exeter Academy. He then went to Harvard, following in the footsteps of his father and grandfathers on both sides as well as all four of his uncles. He graduated in 1937 with an A.B. degree in astronomy. He spent another year at the Harvard College Observatory doing graduate study under Harlow Shapley. At Shapley's urging he went on to graduate studies at the Yerkes Observatory of the University of Chicago where he earned his Ph.D. in Astronomy in 1941. His first major discovery, while in graduate school (1938), was that clouds of solid carbon cause the peculiar dips in the light curve of R Coronae Borealis, the archetype of a class of carbon-rich stars. After earning his doctorate he spent a year at Brenau University teaching Mathematics and Physics. He was of Irish descent and was Catholic.

=== Army Map Service career ===
When World War II broke out, O'Keefe was rejected by the draft so he instead joined the Army Map Service Corps of Engineers as a civilian producing improved maps for the war effort. He continued this work during the cold war. His best-known protégé at Army Map Service was William M. Kaula, who went on to become an authority on satellite geodesy.

=== NASA career ===
O'Keefe joined NASA in December 1958 and became the assistant chief of the Theoretical Division under Robert Jastrow at the Goddard Space Flight Center in Greenbelt, Maryland. He spent the rest of his professional career at Goddard.

During the early Project Apollo-era, O'Keefe was one of the major leaders in developing the American lunar science program and was instrumental in securing astrogeologist Eugene Shoemaker to work with NASA in developing a geology program for the Apollo astronauts. Shoemaker referred to O'Keefe as the "godfather of astrogeology". In 1997, Shoemaker and his wife, Carolyn, named asteroid 6585 after O'Keefe.

Prior to the Moon landings O'Keefe developed a theory that tektites, natural glass objects found in discrete strewn fields around the world, are actually volcanic ejecta from the Moon. He suggested that explosive, hydrogen-driven lunar volcanoes may be the mechanism that launched the tektites to Earth. After the Moon landings his claim was apparently supported by a chemical analysis of a portion of lunar sample 12013 retrieved by Apollo 12 astronaut Pete Conrad that showed a similar major element composition to some tektites found in Southeast Asia. Some Apollo 14 samples also had chemistries similar to tektites. However, most other lunar data strongly challenged the O'Keefe hypothesis, and almost all researchers in this field now accept that tektites are of terrestrial origin, the products of large meteorite or cometary impacts on Earth. This is supported by geochemical, isotopic and mineralogical evidence, and the fact that most tektite strewn fields can now be confidently matched to known impact craters of similar age on Earth.

Several of O'Keefe's ideas about the physics of tektite formation, especially pertaining to Stokes' Law and the slow formation or 'fining' of tektites (apparently not possible in a rapid impact event), still remain as challenges to modern explanations of how tektites might have formed.

NASA's Goddard Space Flight Center conferred its highest honor, the Award of Merit, on O'Keefe in 1992. Advancing Parkinson's disease forced him to retire in 1995.

== Personal life ==
While at the Yerkes Observatory in Williams Bay, Wisconsin, O'Keefe and other graduate students took their meals at the Tulane house. Here he met his future wife, Martha Sylvia Tulane. They later settled in Chevy Chase, Maryland, where they had three sons and six daughters. Their second son, Roy Tulane O'Keefe (Michele Bourdeau) was born on January 5, 1946. Roy joined the Army in 1965, and later was a medic in the Special Forces. He was killed in Vietnam during the Tet Offensive on February 6, 1968. The children all attended Blessed Sacrament grade school in Chevy Chase. The sons all attended the Abbey School in Washington, D.C. O'Keefe was Roman Catholic.

=== Death ===
O'Keefe died on September 8, 2000 (aged 83), in Sioux Falls, South Dakota, from complications of liver cancer and Parkinson's disease. He was surrounded by his wife and children.
