= Ernst Öpik =

Estonian astronomer and astrophysicist (1893–1985)

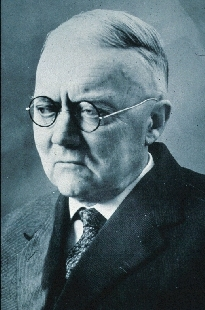
- Ernst Öpik
- Born: 22 October 1893; Kunda, Governorate of Estonia, Russian Empire
- Died: 10 September 1985 (aged 91); Bangor, Northern Ireland, United Kingdom
- Education: University of Moscow; University of Tartu
- Known for: Öpik–Oort cloud
- Relatives: Lembit Öpik (grandson)
- Awards: Gold Medal of the Royal Astronomical Society in 1975; Bruce Medal in 1976
- Scientific career
- Fields: Astronomy
- Workplaces: Armagh Observatory

Ernst Julius Öpik (22 October [O.S. 10 October] 1893 – 10 September 1985) was an Estonian astronomer and astrophysicist who spent the second half of his career (1948–1981) at the Armagh Observatory in Northern Ireland. He is best known for his pioneering work on solar system dynamics, particularly of the Oort cloud and the Yarkovsky effect.

== Education ==
Öpik was born in Kunda, Kreis Wierland, Governorate of Estonia then a part of the Russian Empire. He went to the University of Moscow to specialize in the study of minor bodies, such as asteroids, comets, and meteors. He completed his 1923 doctorate at the University of Tartu.

== Astronomical work ==
He was the first and longest serving editor of the Irish Astronomical Journal (1950–1980) and frequently published his own research there. In 1916 he published an article there in which he estimated the densities of visual binary stars. Using the white dwarf star ο_{2} Eridani B, he determined its density as 25,000 times the density of the Sun but concluded that the result is impossible.

In 1922 he published a paper in which he estimated the distance to the Andromeda Galaxy. He determined the distance using a novel astrophysical method based on the observed rotational velocities of the galaxy, which depends on the total mass around which stars are rotating, and on the assumption that the luminosity per unit mass was the same as that of our galaxy. He concluded that the distance was 450 kpc. His result was in good accordance with other estimates of these days (100 to 1000 kpc) and were closer to recent estimates (778 kpc) than Hubble's result (275 kpc). His method is still widely used.

In 1922 he correctly predicted the frequency of craters on Mars long before they were detected by space probes.

In 1932 he postulated a theory concerning the origins of comets in the Solar System. He believed that they originated in a cloud orbiting far beyond the orbit of Pluto. This cloud is now known as the Oort cloud or alternatively the Öpik-Oort Cloud in his honour. From October 1931 to the end of July 1933, Öpik, Harlow Shapley and Samuel L. Boothroyd headed the Arizona meteor expedition, which detected approximately 22,000 meteors. He also invented a rocking camera for the study of meteors. In 1951 he published a paper concerning the triple-alpha process, describing the burning of helium-4 into carbon-12 in the cores of red giant stars. However, this achievement is often overlooked because Edwin Salpeter's paper on the same subject had already been published by the time Öpik's paper reached Britain and the United States.

== Yarkovsky effect connection ==
The Yarkovsky effect was discovered by the Russian civil engineer Ivan Osipovich Yarkovsky (1844–1902), who worked on scientific problems in his spare time. Writing in a pamphlet around the year 1900, Yarkovsky noted that the diurnal heating of a rotating object in space would cause it to experience a force that, while tiny, could lead to large long-term effects in the orbits of small bodies, especially meteoroids and small asteroids. Yarkovsky's work might have been forgotten had it not been for Öpik, who read Yarkovsky's pamphlet sometime around 1909. Decades later, Öpik discussed the possible importance of the Yarkovsky effect for moving meteoroids about the solar system.

== Exile ==
Öpik fled Estonia in 1944 ahead of the approaching Red Army, in fear of a second Soviet occupation of the Baltic states. Living as a refugee in Germany, he became the Estonian rector of the Baltic University in Exile in the displaced persons camps. In 1948 he was offered a post in Armagh and remained there despite offers of lucrative jobs in America. From the early 1960s to the mid-1970s he also held a position at the University of Maryland, which he visited annually, typically for one semester. As air travel became more common, his refusal to fly made travel to the U.S. from Armagh systematically more difficult and he eventually ceased the annual ritual.

== Awards ==
He won the J. Lawrence Smith Medal from the National Academy of Sciences in 1960, the Meteoritical Society Frederick C. Leonard Memorial Medal in 1968, the Kepler Gold Medal from the American Association for the Advancement of Science & Meteoritical Society in 1972, the Gold Medal of the Royal Astronomical Society in 1975 and the Bruce Medal in 1976.

== Papers ==
- 1951: "Collision probability with the planets and the distribution of planetary matter", Proc. R. Irish Acad. Sect. A, vol. 54, p. 165-199
- 1958: "Physics of Meteor Flight in the Atmosphere".
- 1976: "Interplanetary encounters: Close-range gravitational interactions", Elsevier Scientific Publishing Co., "Developments in Solar System and Space Science", vol 2
- 1977: "About dogma in science and other recollections of an astronomer". Annual Review of Astronomy and Astrophysics, vol. 15, p. 1

== Books ==
- 2004: Physics of Meteor Flight in the Atmosphere, Dover Publications, ISBN 0486438856

== Legacy ==
The Oort cloud is sometimes called "Öpik-Oort cloud". The Comet Interceptor's Optical Periscopic Imager for Comets (OPIC) instrument is named after Ernst Öpik to celebrate the first Estonia's contribution to a science mission of the European Space Agency.

The asteroid 2099 Öpik is named in his honour. The crater Öpik on the Martian moon Phobos is also named for him.

He was the father of the atomic physicist Uuno Öpik. His grandson, Lembit Öpik, was the Liberal Democrat Member of Parliament for Montgomeryshire in Wales from 1997 to 2010.
