= Yarkovsky effect =

Force on a rotating celestial body due to asymmetric thermal radiation

Yarkovsky effect: 1) Radiation from asteroid's surface 2) Prograde rotating asteroid 2.1) Location with "Afternoon" 3) Asteroid's orbit 4) Radiation from Sun

In astrophysics, the Yarkovsky effect is a force acting on a rotating body in space caused by the anisotropic emission of thermal photons, which carry momentum. It is usually considered in relation to meteoroids or small asteroids (about 10 cm to 10 km in diameter), as its influence is most significant for these bodies.

== History of discovery ==
The effect was discovered by the Polish-Russian civil engineer Ivan Osipovich Yarkovsky (1844–1902), who worked in Russia on scientific problems in his spare time. Writing in a pamphlet around the year 1900, Yarkovsky noted that the daily heating of a rotating object in space would cause it to experience a force that, while tiny, could lead to large long-term effects in the orbits of small bodies, especially meteoroids and small asteroids. Yarkovsky's insight would have been forgotten had it not been for the Estonian astronomer Ernst J. Öpik (1893–1985), who read Yarkovsky's pamphlet sometime around 1909. Decades later, Öpik, recalling the pamphlet from memory, discussed the possible importance of the Yarkovsky effect on movement of meteoroids about the Solar System.

== Mechanism ==
The Yarkovsky effect is a consequence of the fact that change in the temperature of an object warmed by radiation (and therefore the intensity of thermal radiation from the object) lags behind changes in the incoming radiation. That is, the surface of the object takes time to become warm when first illuminated, and takes time to cool down when illumination stops. In general there are two components to the effect:

- Diurnal effect: On a rotating body illuminated by the Sun (such as an asteroid or the Earth), the surface is warmed by solar radiation during the day, and cools at night. The thermal properties of the surface cause a lag between the absorption of radiation from the Sun and the emission of radiation as heat, so the surface is warmest not when the Sun is at its peak but slightly later. This results in a difference between the directions of absorption and re-emission of radiation, which yields a net force along the direction of motion of the orbit. If the object is a prograde rotator, then the force is in the direction of motion of the orbit, and causes the semi-major axis of the orbit to increase steadily: the object spirals away from the Sun. A retrograde rotator spirals inward. The diurnal effect is the dominant component for bodies with diameter greater than about 100 m.
- Seasonal effect: This is easiest to understand for the idealised case of a non-rotating body orbiting the Sun, for which each "year" consists of exactly one "day". As it travels around its orbit, the "dusk" hemisphere that has been heated over a long preceding time period is invariably in the direction of orbital motion. The excess of thermal radiation in this direction causes a braking force that always causes spiraling inward toward the Sun. In practice, for rotating bodies, this seasonal effect increases along with the axial tilt. It dominates only if the diurnal effect is small enough. This may occur because of very rapid rotation (no time to cool off on the night side, hence an almost-uniform longitudinal temperature distribution), small size (the whole body is heated throughout), or an axial tilt close to 90°. The seasonal effect is more important for smaller asteroid fragments (from a few metres up to about 100 m), provided their surfaces are not covered by an insulating regolith layer and they do not have exceedingly slow rotations. Additionally, on very long timescales over which the spin axis of the body may be repeatedly changed by collisions (and hence also the direction of the diurnal effect changes), the seasonal effect will also tend to dominate.

In general, the effect is size-dependent, and will affect the semi-major axis of smaller asteroids, while leaving large asteroids practically unaffected. For kilometre-sized asteroids, the Yarkovsky effect is minuscule over short periods: the force on asteroid 6489 Golevka has been estimated at 0.25 newtons, for a net acceleration of 10^{−12} m/s^{2}. But it is steady; over millions of years an asteroid's orbit can be perturbed enough to transport it from the asteroid belt to the inner Solar System.

The mechanism is more complicated for bodies in strongly eccentric orbits.

== Measurement ==
The effect was first measured in 1991–2003 on the asteroid 6489 Golevka. The asteroid drifted 15 km from its predicted position over twelve years (the orbit was established with great precision by a series of radar observations in 1991, 1995, and 1999 from the Arecibo radio telescope).

Without direct measurement, it is very hard to predict the exact result of the Yarkovsky effect on a given asteroid's orbit. This is because the magnitude of the effect depends on many variables that are hard to determine from the limited observational information that is available. These include the exact shape of the asteroid, its orientation, and its albedo. Calculations are further complicated by the effects of shadowing and thermal "reillumination", whether caused by local craters or a possible overall concave shape. The Yarkovsky effect also competes with radiation pressure, whose net effect may cause similar small long-term forces for bodies with albedo variations or non-spherical shapes.

As an example, even for the simple case of the pure seasonal Yarkovsky effect on a spherical body in a circular orbit with 90° obliquity, semi-major axis changes could differ by as much as a factor of two between the case of a uniform albedo and the case of a strong north–south albedo asymmetry. Depending on the object's orbit and spin axis, the Yarkovsky change of the semi-major axis may be reversed simply by changing from a spherical to a non-spherical shape.

Despite these difficulties, using the Yarkovsky effect is one scenario under investigation to alter the course of potentially Earth-impacting near-Earth asteroids. Possible asteroid deflection strategies include "painting" the surface of the asteroid or focusing solar radiation onto the asteroid to alter the intensity of the Yarkovsky effect and so alter the orbit of the asteroid away from a collision with Earth. The OSIRIS-REx mission, launched in September 2016, studied the Yarkovsky effect on asteroid Bennu.

In 2020, astronomers confirmed Yarkovsky acceleration of the asteroid 99942 Apophis. The findings are relevant to asteroid impact avoidance as 99942 Apophis was thought to have a very small chance of Earth impact in 2068, and the Yarkovsky effect was a significant source of prediction uncertainty. In 2021, a multidisciplinary professional-amateur collaboration combined Gaia satellite and ground-based radar measurements with amateur stellar occultation observations to further refine 99942 Apophis's orbit and measure the Yarkovsky acceleration with high precision, to within 0.5%. With these data, astronomers were able to eliminate the possibility of a collision with the Earth for at least the next 100 years.

In 1980, astronomers noticed that Pioneer 10 was deviating from its expected course; analyses by multiple groups over the period 1998–2012 eventually resolved the anomaly as being due to its anisotropic thermal profile; particularly due to where its radioisotope thermoelectric generator is located, rather than external solar heating.

== See also ==
- Asteroid
- Poynting–Robertson effect
- Radiation pressure
- YORP effect
