= YORP effect =

Asteroid rotation perturbation

The Yarkovsky–O'Keefe–Radzievskii–Paddack effect, or YORP effect for short, changes the rotation state of a small astronomical body – that is, the body's spin rate and the obliquity of its pole(s) – due to the scattering of solar radiation off its surface and the emission of its own thermal radiation.

The YORP effect is typically considered for asteroids with their heliocentric orbit in the Solar System. The effect is responsible for the creation of binary and tumbling asteroids as well as for changing an asteroid's pole towards 0°, 90°, or 180° relative to the ecliptic plane and so modifying its heliocentric radial drift rate due to the Yarkovsky effect.

== Term ==
The term was coined by David P. Rubincam in 2000 to honor four important contributors to the concepts behind this effect. In the 19th century, Ivan Yarkovsky realized that the thermal radiation escaping from a body warmed by the Sun carries off momentum as well as heat. Translated into modern physics, each emitted photon possesses a momentum p = E/c where E is its energy and c is the speed of light. Vladimir Radzievskii applied the idea to rotation based on changes in albedo and Stephen Paddack realized that shape was a much more effective means of altering a body's spin rate. Stephen Paddack and John O'Keefe suggested that the YORP effect leads to rotational bursting and by repeatedly undergoing this process, small asymmetric bodies are eventually reduced to dust.

== Physical mechanism ==
In principle, electromagnetic radiation interacts with the surface of an asteroid in three significant ways: radiation from the Sun is (1) absorbed and (2) diffusively reflected by the surface of the body and the body's internal energy is (3) emitted as thermal radiation. Since photons possess momentum, each of these interactions leads to changes in the angular momentum of the body relative to its center of mass. If considered for only a short period of time, these changes are very small, but over longer periods of time, these changes may integrate to significant changes in the angular momentum of the body. For bodies in a heliocentric orbit, the relevant long period of time is the orbital period (i.e., year), since most asteroids have rotation periods (i.e., days) shorter than their orbital periods. Thus, for most asteroids, the YORP effect is the secular change in the rotation state of the asteroid after averaging the solar radiation torques over first the rotational period and then the orbital period.

== Observations ==
In 2007, there was direct observational confirmation of the YORP effect on the small asteroids 54509 YORP (then designated 2000 PH5) and 1862 Apollo. The spin rate of 54509 YORP will double in just 600,000 years, and the YORP effect can also alter the axial tilt and precession rate, so that the entire suite of YORP phenomena can send asteroids into interesting resonant spin states, and helps explain the existence of binary asteroids.

Observations show that asteroids larger than 125 km (78 mi) in diameter have rotation rates that follow a Maxwellian frequency distribution, while smaller asteroids (in the 50–125 km (31–78 mi) size range) show a small excess of fast rotators. The smallest asteroids (size less than 50 km (31 mi)) show a clear excess of very fast and slow rotators, and this becomes even more pronounced as smaller-sized populations are measured. These results suggest that one or more size-dependent mechanisms are depopulating the centre of the spin rate distribution in favour of the extremes. The YORP effect is a prime candidate. It is not capable of significantly modifying the spin rates of large asteroids by itself, so a different explanation must be sought for objects such as 253 Mathilde.

In late 2013 asteroid P/2013 R3 was observed breaking apart, likely because of a high rotation speed from the YORP effect.

== Examples ==
Assume a rotating spherical asteroid has two wedge-shaped fins attached to its equator, irradiated by parallel rays of sunlight. The reaction force from photons departing from any given surface element of the spherical core will be normal to the surface, such that no torque is produced (the force vectors all pass through the centre of mass).

A spherical asteroid with two wedge-shaped projections. Re-radiated light from the "B" fin has the same magnitude as the "A" fin, but is not parallel to the incoming light. This produces a torque on the object.

Thermally-emitted photons reradiated from the sides of the wedges, however, can produce a torque, as the normal vectors do not pass through the centre of mass. Both fins present the same cross-section to the incoming light (they have the same height and width), and so absorb and reflect the same amount of energy each and produce an equal force. Due to the fin surfaces being oblique, however, the normal forces from the reradiated photons do not cancel out. In the diagram, fin A's outgoing radiation produces an equatorial force parallel to the incoming light and no vertical force, but fin B's force has a smaller equatorial component and a vertical component. The unbalanced forces on the two fins lead to torque, and the object spins. The torque from the outgoing light does not average out, even over a full rotation, so the spin accelerates over time.

An object with some "windmill" asymmetry can therefore be subjected to minuscule torque forces that will tend to spin it up or down as well as make its axis of rotation precess. The YORP effect is zero for a rotating ellipsoid if there are no irregularities in surface temperature or albedo.

In the long term, the object's changing obliquity and rotation rate may wander randomly, chaotically or regularly, depending on several factors. For example, assuming the Sun remains on its equator, asteroid 951 Gaspra, with a radius of 6 km and a semi-major axis of 2.21 AU, would in 240 Ma (240 million years) go from a rotation period of 12 h to 6 h and vice versa. If 243 Ida were given the same radius and orbit values as Gaspra, it would spin up or down twice as fast, while a body with Phobos' shape would take several billion years to change its spin by the same amount.

Size as well as shape affects the amount of the effect. Smaller objects will spin up or down much more quickly. If Gaspra were smaller by a factor of 10 (to a radius of 500 m), its spin will halve or double in just a few million years. Similarly, the YORP effect intensifies for objects closer to the Sun. At 1 AU, Gaspra would double/halve its spin rate in a mere 100,000 years. After one million years, its period may shrink to ~2 h, at which point it could start to break apart. According to a 2019 model, the YORP effect is likely to cause "widespread fragmentation of asteroids" as the Sun expands into a luminous red giant, and may explain the dust disks and apparent infalling matter observed at many white dwarfs.

This is one mechanism through which binary asteroids may form, and it may be more common than collisions and planetary near-encounter tidal disruption as the primary means of binary formation.

Asteroid 2000 PH_{5} was later named 54509 YORP to honor its part in the confirmation of this phenomenon.

== See also ==
- 101955 Bennu – Carbonaceous Apollo asteroid
- 25143 Itokawa – Potentially hazardous near-Earth asteroid in the Apollo group
- Radiation pressure – Pressure exerted upon any surface exposed to electromagnetic radiation
- Radiometer – Device for measuring the radiant flux (power) of electromagnetic radiation
- Yarkovsky effect – Force on a rotating celestial body due to asymmetric thermal radiation

== General and cited references ==
- O'Keefe, John A. (1976). Tektites and Their Origin. Elsevier. ISBN 978-0-444-41350-5. Draft manuscript/report.
- Paddack, Stephen J (1969). "Rotational bursting of small celestial bodies: Effects of radiation pressure". J. Geophys. Res. 74 (17): 4379–4381. Bibcode:1969JGR....74.4379P. doi:10.1029/jb074i017p04379.
- Radzievskii, V. V. (1954). "A mechanism for the disintegration of asteroids and meteorites". Doklady Akademii Nauk SSSR. 97: 49–52.
- Rubincam, David P (2000). "Radiative spin-up and spin-down of small asteroids". Icarus. 148 (1): 2–11. Bibcode:2000Icar..148....2R. doi:10.1006/icar.2000.6485.
