= Enduring Quests and Daring Visions =

NASA vision

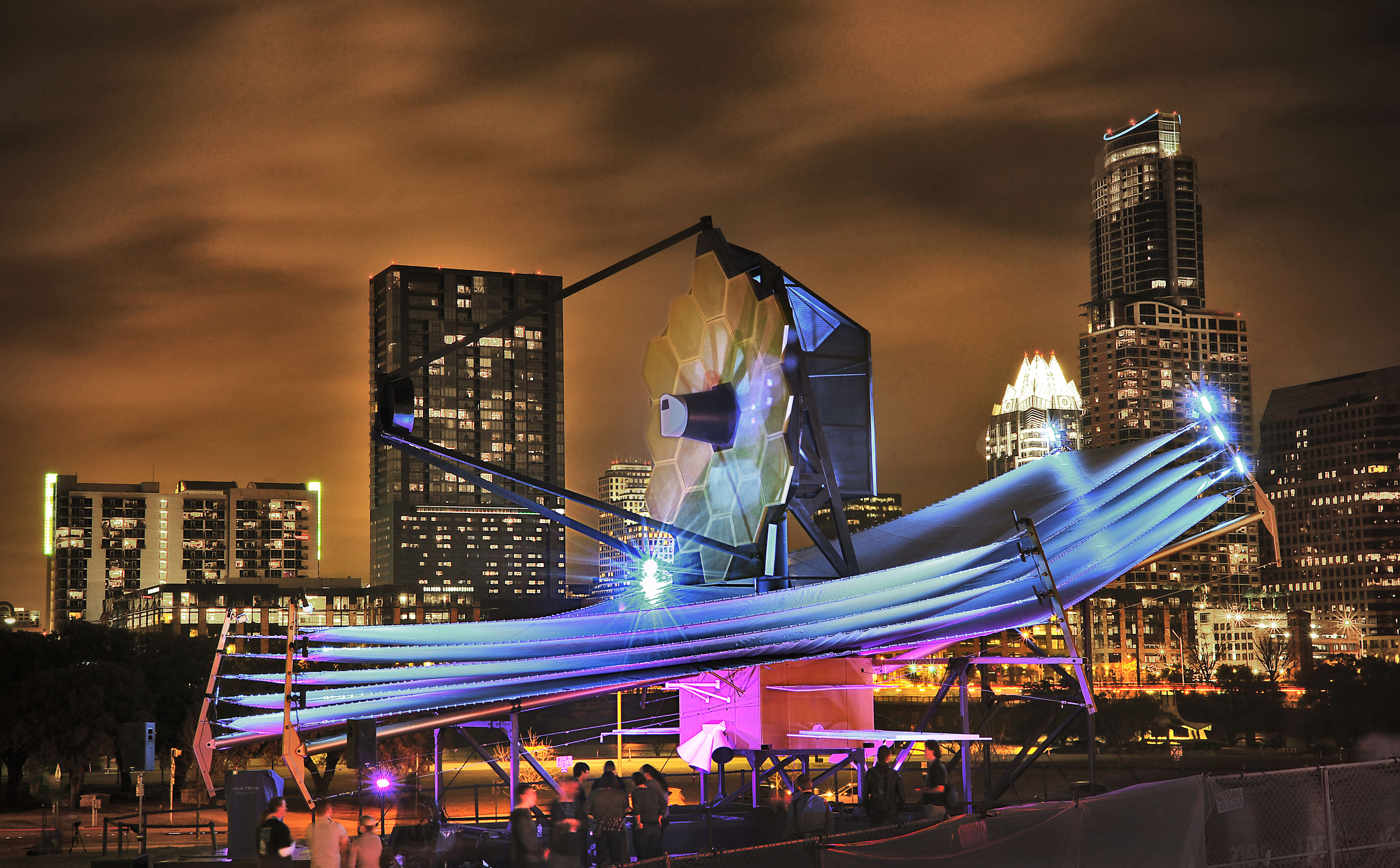
A full-scale model of the James Webb Space Telescope in Texas, USA

Enduring Quests and Daring Visions is a vision for astrophysics programs chartered by then-Director of NASA's Astrophysics Division, Paul Hertz, and released in late 2013. It lays out plans over 30 years as long-term goals and missions. Goals include mapping the Cosmic Microwave Background and finding Earth like exoplanets, to go deeper into space-time studying the Large Scale Structure of the Universe, extreme physics, and looking back further in time. The panel that produced the vision featured many notable American astrophysicists, including: Chryssa Kouveliotou, Eric Agol, Natalie Batalha, Misty Bentz, Alan Dressler, Scott Gaudi, Olivier Guyon, Enectali Figueroa-Feliciano, Feryal Ozel, Aki Roberge, Amber Straughn, and Joan Centrella.

Examples of discussed missions include:

- Astro-H (Hitomi)
- Black Hole Mapper
- CMB Polarization Surveyor
- Cosmic Dawn
- Euclid
- ExoEarth Mapper
- Gaia
- Gravitational Wave Surveyor/Mapper
- Habitable Exoplanet Imaging Mission (HabEx)
- Far-Infrared Surveyor (later renamed the Origins Space Telescope)
- JEM-EUSO
- James Webb Space Telescope (JWST)
- Large UV Optical Infrared Surveyor (LUVOIR)
- Nancy Grace Roman Space Telescope
- Neutron Star Interior Composition Explorer (NICER)
- Transiting Exoplanet Survey Satellite (TESS)
- X-Ray Surveyor (later renamed the Lynx X-ray Observatory)
