= List of proposed space telescopes =

This list contains proposals for space telescopes, space-based (situated in space) astronomical observatories. It is a list of past and present space observatory plans, concepts, and proposals. For observatories in orbit, see list of space telescopes. Unlike that list, this one includes concepts and proposals that are unlikely ever to be launched, as they may have been cancelled or were only proposals.

== Space observatories under development ==
Name	Agency	Type	Proposed launch date	Status	Proposed location	Ref(s)
TOLIMAN	NASA	visible	2027	under construction	Low Earth orbit	
Xuntian	CNSA	ultraviolet, visible, infrared	2027	under construction	Low Earth orbit	
PLATO	ESA	visible	2027	under construction	Sun-Earth L_{2} Lagrange point	
ULTRASAT	ISA	ultraviolet	2027		Geosynchronous orbit	
Compton Spectrometer and Imager	NASA	gamma ray	2027		Low Earth orbit	
ARIEL	ESA	visible, infrared	2031		Sun-Earth L_{2} Lagrange point	
Lazuli Space Telescope	Schmidt Sciences	visible, near-infrared	2028	Proposed, funded	Elliptical orbit	
Spektr-UV (WSO-UV)	Roscosmos	ultraviolet	2031	funded	Geosynchronous orbit	
UVEX	NASA	ultraviolet	2030		Highly elliptical orbit	
LiteBIRD	JAXA	millimeter radio	2032	Approved for development	Sun-Earth L_{2} Lagrange point	
AXIS (Advanced X-Ray Imaging Satellite)	NASA	X-Ray	2032	early planning	Low Earth orbit	
PRIMA (PRobe far-Infrared Mission for Astrophysics)	NASA	far-infrared	2032	Approved for development	Sun-Earth L_{2} Lagrange point	
Taiji	CNSA/CAS	gravitational waves	2033	phase 1 of 3-phase development completed	Heliocentric orbit	
Laser Interferometer Space Antenna (LISA)	ESA	gravitational waves	2035	Approved for development	Solar Earth-trailing orbit (approx. 1 AU)	
Advanced Telescope for High Energy Astrophysics	ESA	x-ray	2037		Sun-Earth L_{2} Lagrange point	
Habitable Worlds Observatory	NASA	Ultraviolet, Visible, Infrared	2041	early planning 'Phase 1'	Sun-Earth L_{2} Lagrange point	
X-Ray Great Observatory	NASA	X-Ray	2047	early planning 'Phase 1'	possibly Sun-Earth L_{2} Lagrange point	
Far-Infrared Great Observatory	NASA	Far-Infrared	2051	early planning 'Phase 1'	possibly Sun-Earth L_{2} Lagrange point	
AstroSat-2	ISRO	Near Ultraviolet, Far Ultraviolet, Visible	TBD	–	Low Earth orbit	
ExoWorlds Mission	ISRO		TBD			
Indian spectroscopic and imaging space telescope (INSIST)	ISRO		TBD			
Galileo Solar Space Telescope	INPE	Visible and ultraviolet	TBD	Admission process at AEB	Low Earth orbit or Geostationary orbit	

== Merged, cancelled, or superseded space observatories ==
Name	Agency	Type	Proposed launch date	Status	Proposed location	Ref(s)
X-Ray Evolving Universe Spectroscopy Mission (XEUS)	ESA	X-ray	Merged into IXO		–	
Constellation-X	NASA	X-ray	Merged into IXO		–	
International X-ray Observatory (IXO)	NASA & ESA & JAXA	X-ray	No funding 2011; rebooted as ATHENA		–	
Exoplanetary Circumstellar Environments and Disk Explorer (EXCEDE)	NASA	?	2016	–	Sun-synchronous Earth orbit, 2000 km	
SIM Lite Astrometric Observatory	NASA	?	2015	No funding 2010	–	
Darwin Mission	ESA	?	–	–	Sun-Earth L_{2} Lagrange point	
Terrestrial Planet Finder	NASA	?	TBA	No funding 2011	–	
Dark Universe Observatory	NASA	?	Superseded by Roman/WFIRST		Earth orbit (600 km)	
Joint Dark Energy Mission	NASA & DOE	?	Superseded by Roman/WFIRST		–	
Astromag Free-Flyer (Particles)	NASA	?	1 January 2005	–	Earth orbit (500 km)	
VSOP-2 (Astro-G) (Radio)	JAXA	?	2012	Cancelled 2011	–	
SAFIR	NASA	far infrared	Superseded by Origins		Sun-Earth L_{2} Lagrange point	ref?

== Additional examples and non-space telescopes ==
For launch in the 2030s, NASA is evaluating four possible designs: the Origins Space Telescope, Lynx X-ray Observatory, Habitable Exoplanets Observatory (HabEx), and Large UV Optical Infrared Surveyor (LUVOIR).

Balloon-borne telescopes have been in use since the 1950s. A 20–30 meter balloon telescope has been suggested. The balloon would be transparent on one side, and have a circular reflecting mirror on the other side. There are two main designs using this principle.

- Large Balloon Reflector (LBR) (sub-orbital version)
- Space-based Large Balloon Reflector (LBR)
  - TeraHertz Space Telescope (TST)

== Additional examples ==
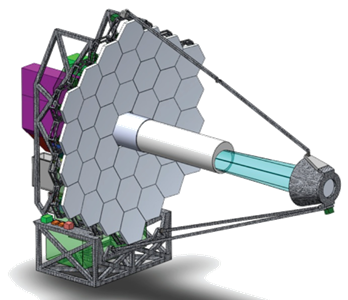
8-meter segmented LUVOIR-B (formerly ATLAST) telescope

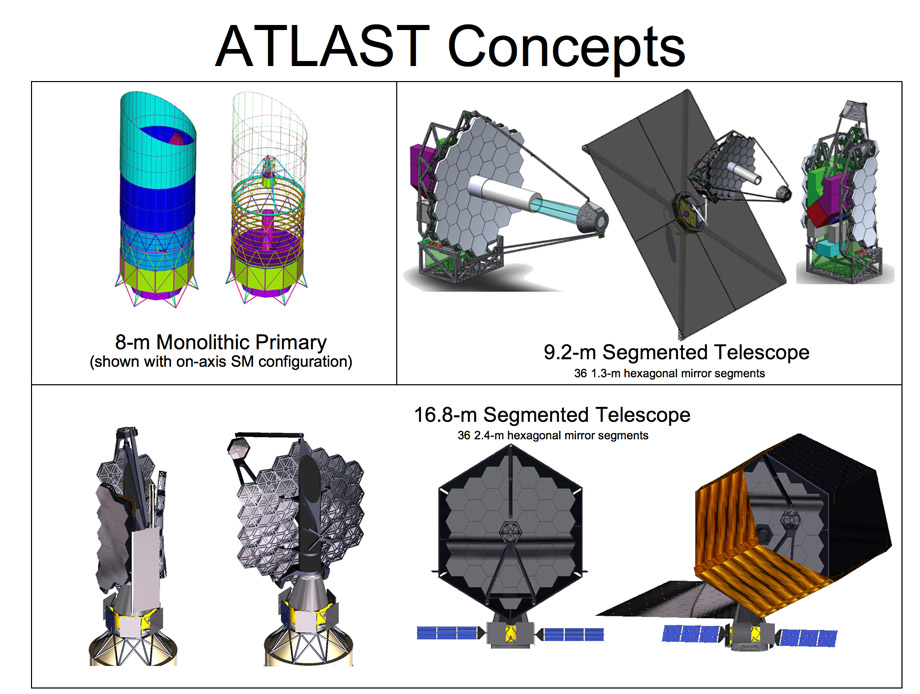
ATLAST produced several versions for the LUVOIR telescope

- Advanced Telescope for High Energy Astrophysics (ATHENA)
- Big Bang Observer
- Cosmological Advanced Survey Telescope for Optical and UV Research (CASTOR)
- Deci-hertz Interferometer Gravitational wave Observatory (DECIGO)
- EChO
- Fast Infrared Exoplanet Spectroscopy Survey Explorer (FINESSE)
- Gravity and Extreme Magnetism Small Explorer (GEMS)
- Habitable Exoplanets Observatory (HabEx), a large UV to NIR focused design, 4 meter mirror
- LOFT - Large Observatory For X-ray Timing
- Large Ultraviolet Optical Infrared Surveyor
- Large Interferometer For Exoplanets
- Nautilus Deep Space Observatory
- Near-Earth Object Surveillance Mission (formerly Near-Earth Object Camera (NEOcam))
- PEGASE
- Planetary Dynamics Explorer
- Space Infrared Telescope for Cosmology and Astrophysics (SPICA)
- Telescope for Habitable Exoplanets and Interstellar/Intergalactic Astronomy (THEIA)
- THESEUS
- Waypoint-1 Space Telescope, visible light, UV and hyper-spectral imaging for astrophysical research and ground observation
- Whipple, proposed transit telescope for KBO and Oort objects
- ZEBRA, Zodiacal dust, Extragalactic Background and Reionization Apparatus A small infrared observatory sent out to 10 AU by NASA
- Membrane Space Telescope: A concept of huge reflecting telescopes in space, where the primary mirror would be composed of very thin and lightweight membrane, that would be kept in the required accurate shape by thermal radiative pressure projected from behind. ~15nm RMS precision was achieved in prototype testing.

== See also ==
- Lists of telescopes
- Lists of spacecraft
