= SAFIR =

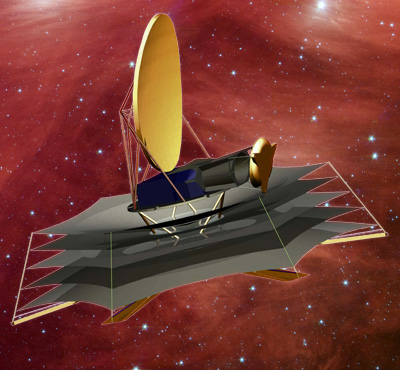
CALISTO architecture for SAFIR

SAFIR (or Single Aperture Far-InfraRed) is a proposed NASA space observatory for far-infrared light. The plan calls for a single large mirror 5–10 meters (16–33 ft) in diameter, cryogenically cooled to 5 kelvins (−268 °C; −451 °F). This would feed detector arrays sensitive from 5 to 1000 μm. The possibility of servicing such a telescope in space has been evaluated.

The design for SAFIR's primary mirror is large for a space-based telescope; for comparison, SAFIR's predecessor, the 2003 Spitzer Space Telescope, has a primary mirror only 0.85 meters (2.8 ft) in diameter. SAFIR is oriented towards longer wavelengths so the mirror does not have to be as accurate compared to visible and near-infrared telescopes like the Hubble Space Telescope.

== Mission ==
SAFIR will study the earliest phases of forming galaxies, stars, and planetary systems at wavelengths where these objects are brightest and which contain a wealth of unique information: from 20 micrometers to one millimeter. Most of this portion of the electromagnetic spectrum is not accessible from the ground because it is absorbed by moisture in Earth's atmosphere.

The combination of large mirror size and cold temperature would be designed to make SAFIR more than 1000 times more sensitive than Spitzer or even the Herschel Space Observatory; approaching the ultimate sensitivity limits at far-infrared and submillimeter wavelengths. SAFIR's sensitivity will be limited only by the irreducible noise of photons in the astrophysical background, rather than by infrared radiation from the telescope itself.

=== Observation ===
What makes this part of the spectrum so important is that, while far-infrared and submillimeter light can penetrate dust clouds, half or more of the optical and ultraviolet light produced in the universe is absorbed by dust and re-radiated in the far-infrared and submillimeter. Even in our local area of the universe, many galaxies are so dusty that they radiate mainly at those wavelengths.

This has two important consequences. First, to accurately measure the energy output and structure of objects that are obscured by dust, far-infrared continuum emission (emission across a broad band of wavelengths) must be included. Second, spectroscopy at these wavelengths makes the best probe of conditions in the vast clouds of dust and gases that lie between stars, known as the interstellar medium (ISM). These general features apply on all scales from the formation of stars and planetary systems in our corner of the Milky Way to the earliest galaxies that formed when the universe was only 10% to 20% of its current age.

== Design ==
As a concept, wide ranges of technologies and architectures have been examined. The use of technology from the James Webb Space Telescope was also explored.

== See also ==
- Far-infrared astronomy
- Infrared astronomy
- List of proposed space observatories
- Origins Space Telescope
- SPICA
