= Lynx X-ray Observatory =

Proposed NASA space telescope

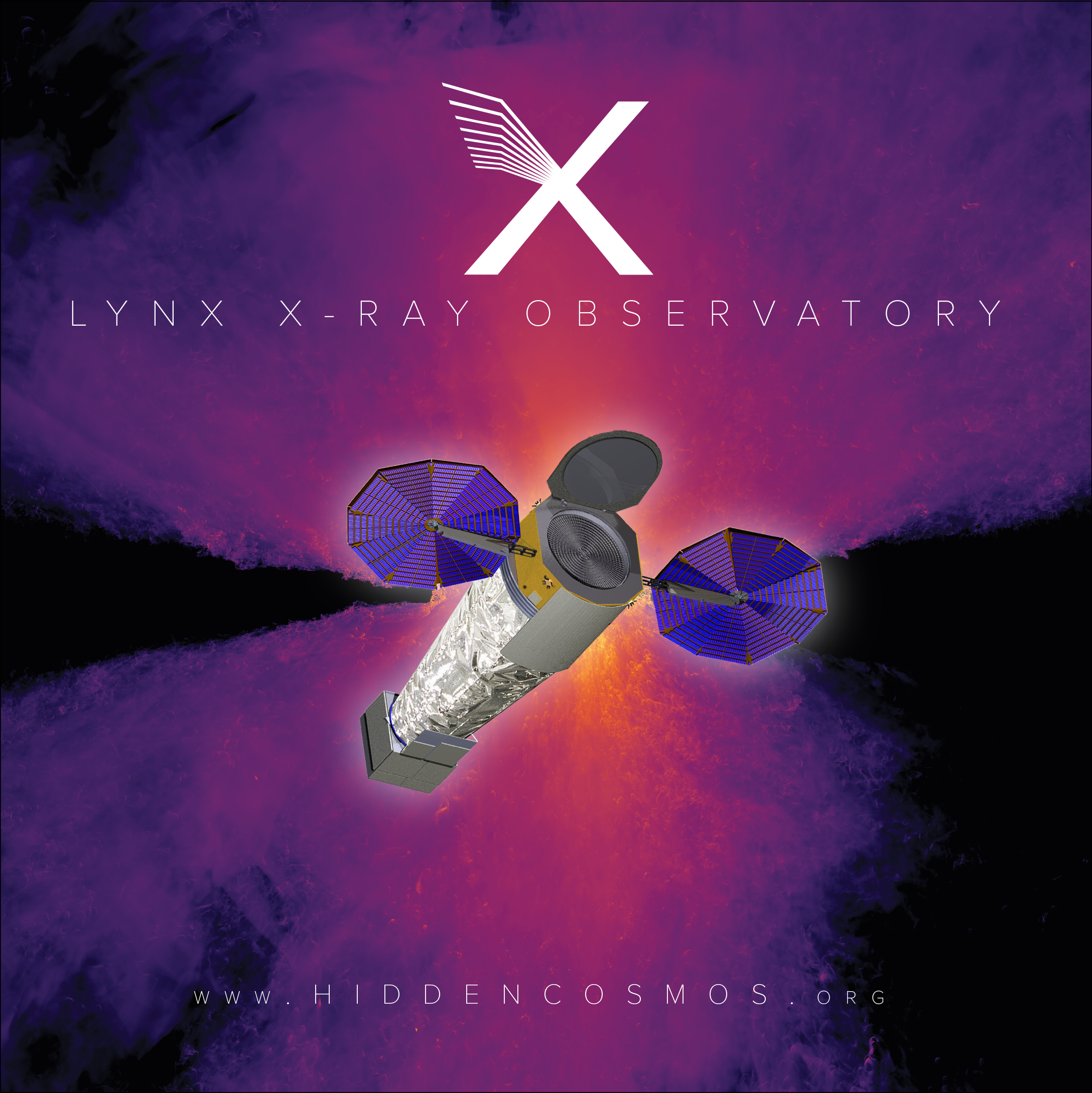
- The Lynx X-ray Observatory
- Names: Lynx X-ray Surveyor (previous name)
- Mission type: Space telescope
- Operator: NASA
- Website: www.lynxobservatory.org

Start of mission
- Launch date: 2036 (proposed)

Orbital parameters
- Reference system: Sun–Earth L_{2} orbit

Main telescope
- Type: Wolter telescope
- Diameter: 3 m (9.8 ft)
- Focal length: 10 m (33 ft)
- Collecting area: 2 m^{2} (22 sq ft) at 1 keV
- Wavelengths: X-ray
- Resolution: 0.5 arcsec across the entire field of view

Instruments
- Lynx X-ray Mirror Assembly (LMA); High Definition X-ray Imager (HDXI); Lynx X-ray Microcalorimeter (LXM); X-ray Grating Spectrometer (XGS)
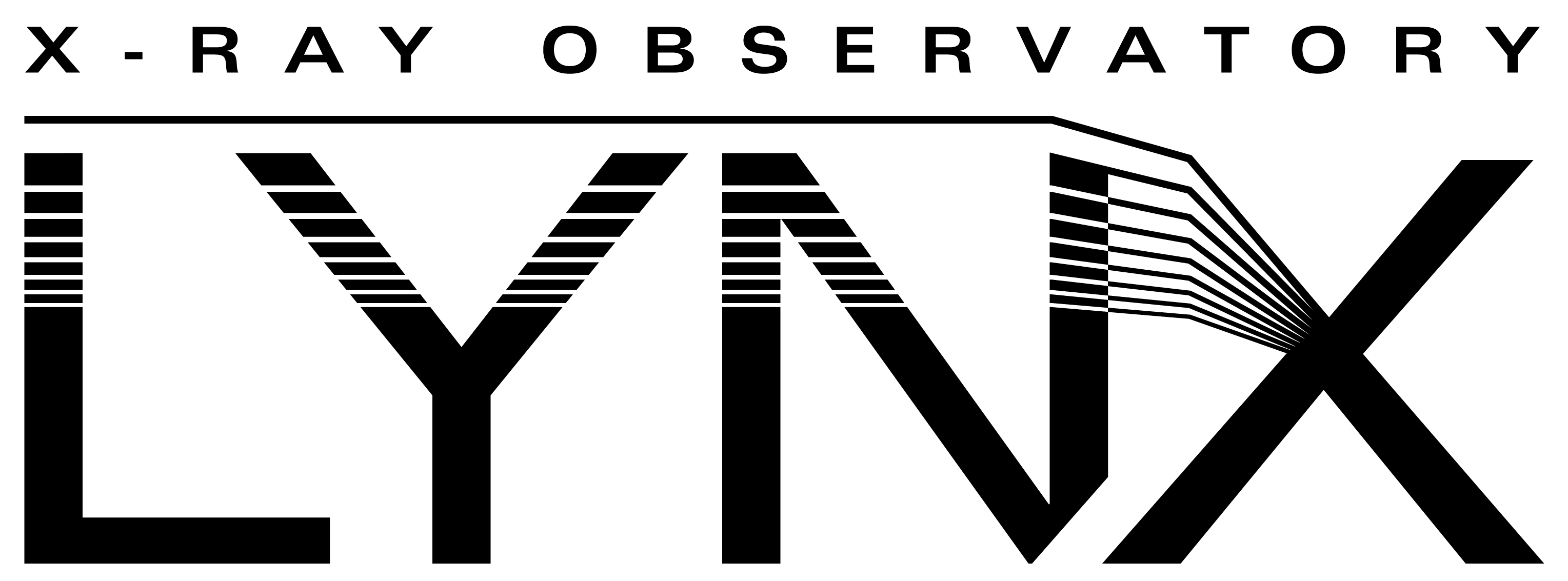
- The Lynx X-ray Observatory Wordmark Next Great Observatories Large strategic science mission

The Lynx X-ray Observatory (Lynx) is a NASA-funded Large Mission Concept Study commissioned as part of the National Academy of Sciences 2020 Astronomy and Astrophysics Decadal Survey. The concept study phase is complete as of August 2019, and the Lynx final report has been submitted to the Decadal Survey for prioritization. If launched, Lynx would be the most powerful X-ray astronomy observatory constructed to date, enabling order-of-magnitude advances in capability over the current Chandra X-ray Observatory and XMM-Newton space telescopes.

== Background ==
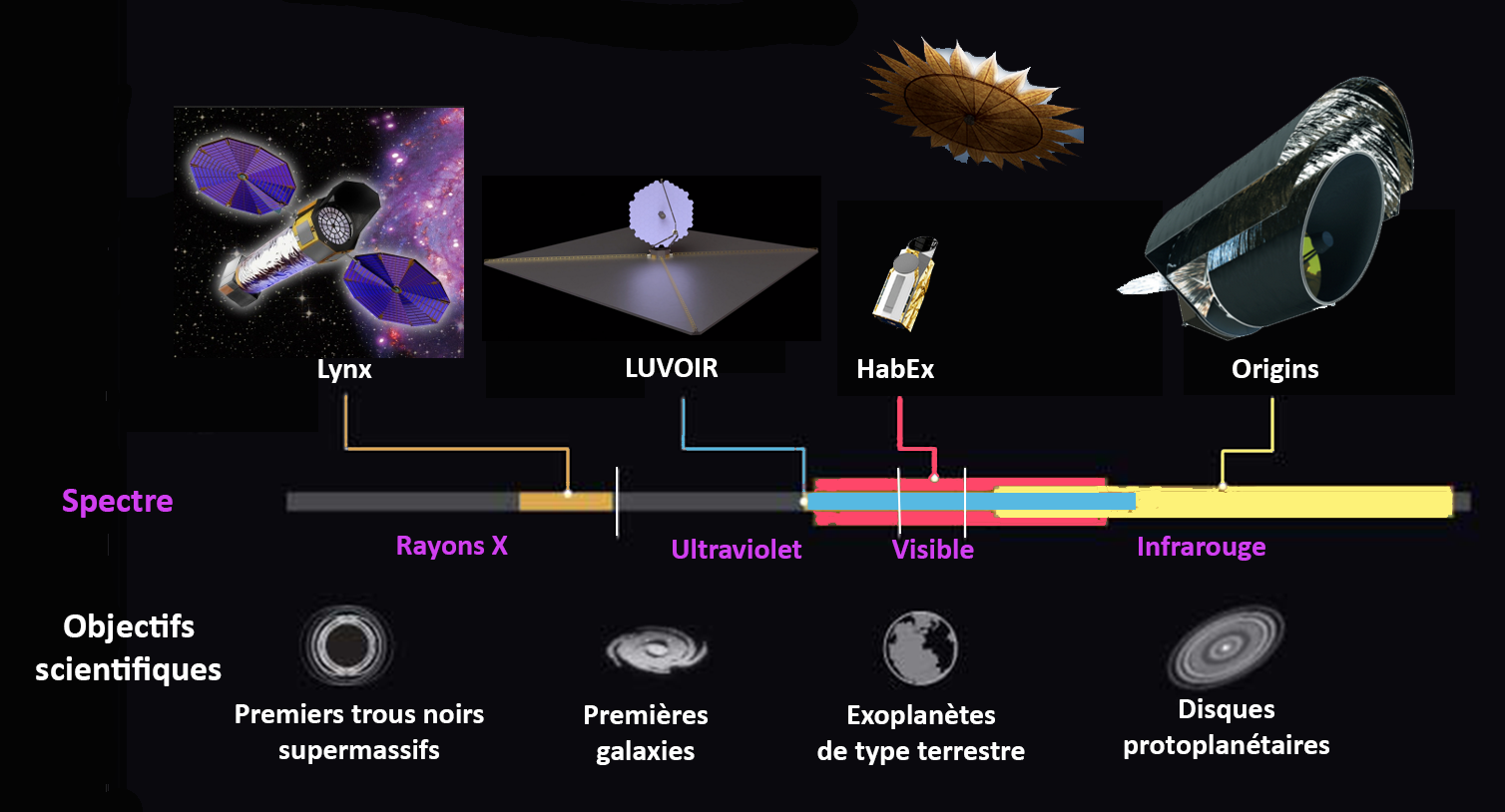
Comparison of Lynx with other proposed space telescopes (LUVOIR, HabEx and Origins)

In 2016, following recommendations laid out in the so-called Astrophysics Roadmap of 2013, NASA established four space telescope concept studies for future Large strategic science missions. In addition to Lynx (originally called X-ray Surveyor in the Roadmap document), they are the Habitable Exoplanet Imaging Mission (HabEx), the Large Ultraviolet Optical Infrared Surveyor (LUVOIR), and the Origins Space Telescope (OST, originally called the Far-Infrared Surveyor). The four teams completed their final reports in August 2019, and turned them over to both NASA and the National Academy of Sciences, whose independent Decadal Survey committee advises NASA on which mission should take top priority. If it receives top prioritization and therefore funding, Lynx would launch in approximately 2036. It would be placed into a halo orbit around the second Sun–Earth Lagrange point (L2), and would carry enough propellant for more than twenty years of operation without servicing.

The Lynx concept study involved more than 200 scientists and engineers across multiple international academic institutions, aerospace, and engineering companies. The Lynx Science and Technology Definition Team (STDT) was co-chaired by Alexey Vikhlinin and Feryal Özel. Jessica Gaskin was the NASA Study Scientist, and the Marshall Space Flight Center managed the Lynx Study Office jointly with the Smithsonian Astrophysical Observatory, which is part of the Center for Astrophysics | Harvard & Smithsonian.

== Scientific objectives ==
According to the concept study's Final Report, the Lynx Design Reference Mission was intentionally optimized to enable major advances in the following three astrophysical discovery areas:

- The dawn of black holes (Chapter 1 of the Lynx Report)
- The drivers of galaxy formation and evolution (Lynx Report, Chapter 2)
- The energetic properties of stellar evolution and stellar ecosystems (Lynx Report, Chapter 3)

Collectively, these serve as three "science pillars" that set the baseline requirements for the observatory. Those requirements include greatly enhanced sensitivity, a sub-arcsecond point spread function stable across the telescope's field of view, and very high spectral resolution for both imaging and gratings spectroscopy. These requirements, in turn, enable a broad science case with major contributions across the astrophysical landscape (as summarized in Chapter 4 of the Lynx Report), including multi-messenger astronomy, black hole accretion physics, large-scale structure, Solar System science, and even exoplanets. The Lynx team markets the mission's science capabilities as "transformationally powerful, flexible, and long-lived", inspired by the spirit of NASA's Great Observatories program.

== Mission design and payload ==
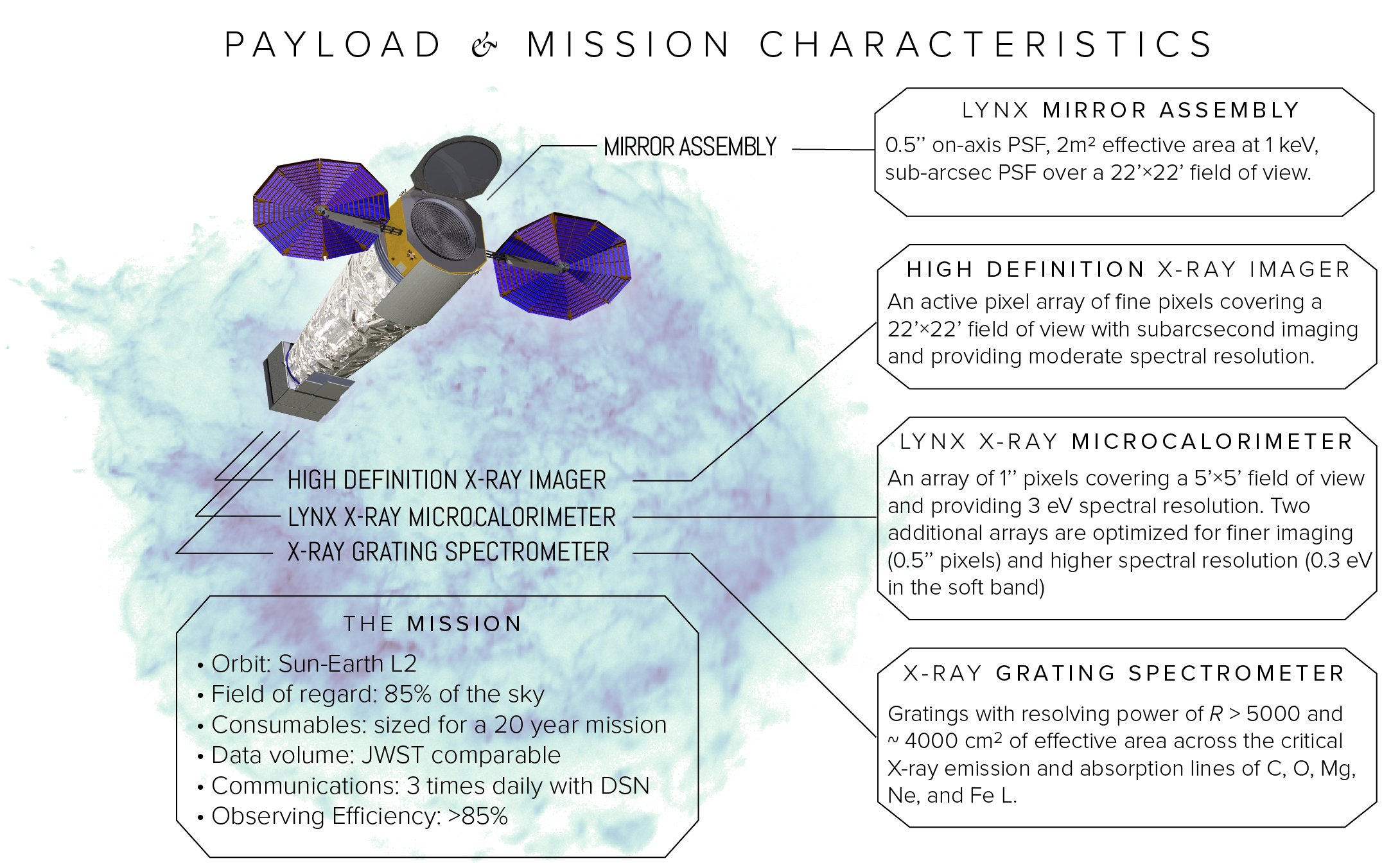
The Lynx Spacecraft draws on heritage from the Chandra X-ray Observatory, while flying a vastly more powerful X-ray Mirror Assembly and three scientific instruments.

=== Spacecraft ===
As described in Chapters 6-10 of the concept study's Final Report, Lynx is designed as an X-ray observatory with a grazing incidence X-ray telescope and detectors that record the position, energy, and arrival time of individual X-ray photons. Post-facto aspect reconstruction leads to modest requirements on pointing precision and stability, while enabling accurate sky locations for detected photons. The design of the Lynx spacecraft draws heavily on heritage from the Chandra X-ray Observatory, with few moving parts and high technology readiness level elements. Lynx will operate in a halo orbit around Sun-Earth L2, enabling high observing efficiency in a stable environment. Its maneuvers and operational procedures on-orbit are nearly identical to Chandra's, and similar design approaches promote longevity. Without in-space servicing, Lynx will carry enough consumables to enable continuous operation for at least twenty years. The spacecraft and payload elements are, however, designed to be serviceable, potentially enabling an even longer lifetime.

=== Payload ===
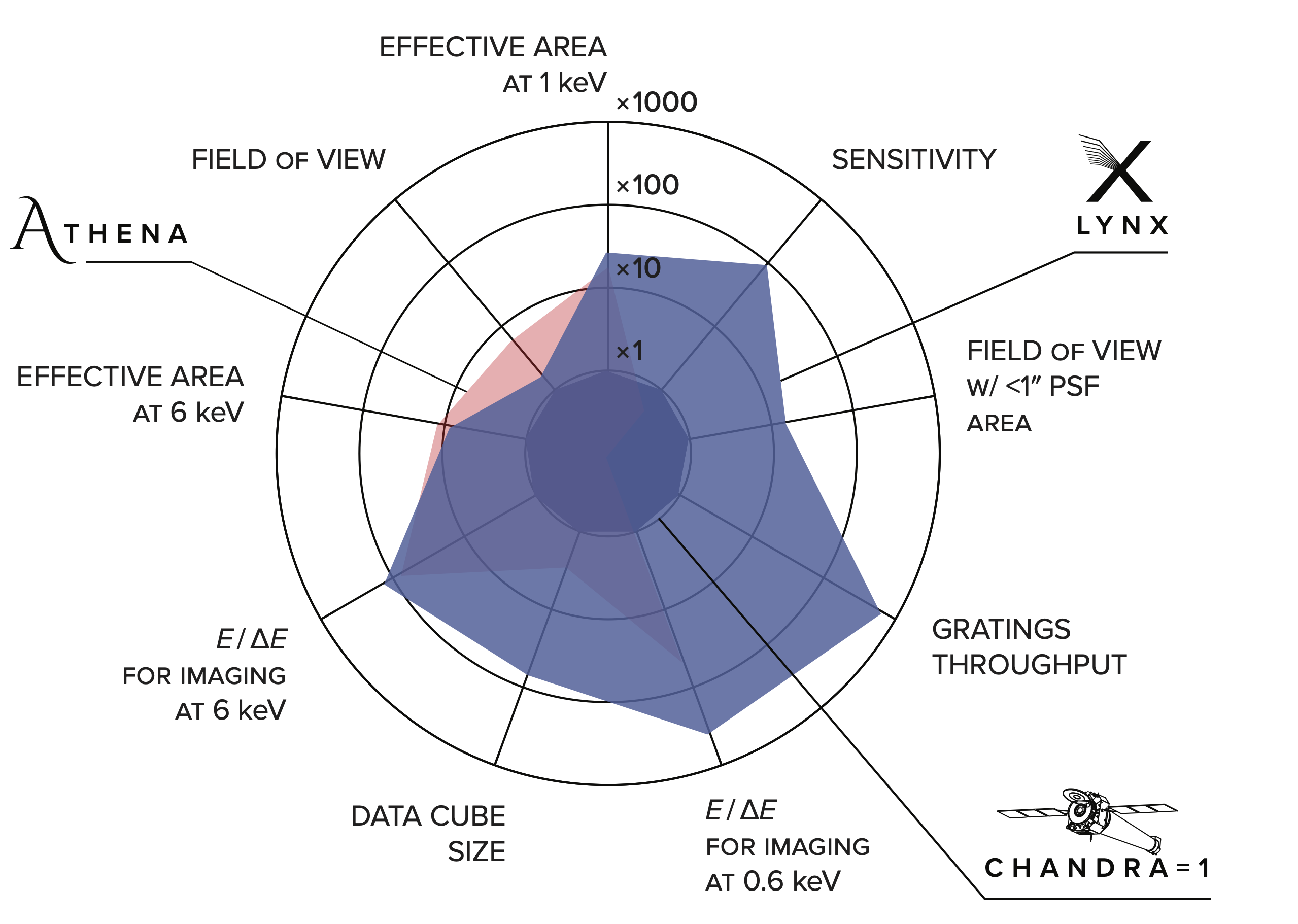
A "spider diagram" illustrating the capabilities of the Lynx X-ray Observatory mission concept relative to the Chandra X-ray Observatory and Athena X-ray Observatory.

The major advances in sensitivity, spatial, and spectral resolution in the Lynx Design Reference Mission are enabled by the spacecraft's payload, namely the mirror assembly and suite of three science instruments. The Lynx Report notes that each of the payload elements features state-of-the-art technologies while also representing a natural evolution of existing instrumentation technology development over the last two decades. The key technologies are currently at Technology Readiness Levels (TRL) 3 or 4. The Lynx Report notes that, with three years of targeted pre-phase A development in early 2020s, three of four key technologies will be matured to TRL 5 and one will reach TRL 4 by start of Phase A, achieving TRL 5 shortly thereafter. The Lynx payload consists of the following four major elements:

- The Lynx X-ray Mirror Assembly (LMA): The LMA is the central element of the observatory, enabling the major advances in sensitivity, spectroscopic throughput, survey speed, and greatly improved imaging relative to Chandra due to greatly improved off-axis performance. The Lynx design reference mission baselines a new technology called Silicon Metashell Optics (SMO), in which thousands of very thin, highly polished segments of nearly pure silicon are stacked into tightly packed concentric shells. Of the three mirror technologies considered for Lynx, the SMO design is currently the most advanced in terms of demonstrated performance (already approaching what is required for Lynx). The SMO's highly modular design lends itself to parallelized manufacturing and assembly, while also providing high fault tolerance: if some individual mirror segments or even modules are damaged, the impact to schedule and cost is minimal.
- The High Definition X-ray Imager (HDXI): The HDXI is the main imager for Lynx, providing high spatial resolution over a wide field of view (FOV) and high sensitivity over the 0.2–10 keV bandpass. Its 0.3 arcsecond (0.3′′) pixels will adequately sample the Lynx mirror point spread function over a 22′ × 22′ FOV. The 21 individual sensors of the HDXI are laid out along the optimal focal surface to improve the off-axis PSF. The Lynx DRM uses Complementary Metal Oxide Semiconductor (CMOS) Active Pixel Sensor (APS) technology, which is projected to have the required capabilities (i.e., high readout rates, high broad-band quantum efficiency, sufficient energy resolution, minimal pixel crosstalk, and radiation hardness). The Lynx team has identified three options with comparable TRL ratings (TRL 3) and sound TRL advancement roadmaps: the Monolithic CMOS, Hybrid CMOS, and Digital CCDs with CMOS readout. All are currently funded for technology development.
- The Lynx X-ray Microcalorimeter (LXM): The LXM is an imaging spectrometer that provides high resolving power (R ~ 2,000) in both the hard and soft X-ray bands, combined with high spatial resolution (down to 0.5′′ scales). To meet the diverse range of Lynx science requirements, the LXM focal plane includes three arrays that share the same readout technology. Each array is differentiated by its absorber pixel size and thickness, and by how the absorbers are connected to thermal readouts. The total number of pixels exceeds 100,000 — a major leap over past and currently planned X-ray microcalorimeters. This huge improvement does not entail a huge added cost: two of the LXM arrays feature a simple, already proven, "thermal" multiplexing approach where multiple absorbers are connected to a single temperature sensor. This design brings the number of sensors to read out (one of the main power and cost drivers for the X-ray microcalorimeters) to ~7,600. This is only a modest increase over what is planned for the X-IFU instrument on Athena. As of Spring 2019, prototypes of the focal plane have been made that include all three arrays at 2/3 full size. These prototypes demonstrate that arrays with the pixel form factor, size, and wiring density required by Lynx are readily achievable, with high yield. The energy resolution requirements of the different pixel types is also readily achievable. Although the LXM is technically still at TRL 3, there is a clear path for achieving TRL 4 by 2020 and TRL 5 by 2024.
- The X-ray Grating Spectrometer (XGS): The XGS will provide even higher spectral resolution (R = 5,000 with a goal of 7,500) in the soft X-ray band for point sources. Compared to the current state of the art (Chandra), the XGS provides a factor of > 5 higher spectral resolution and a factor of several hundred higher throughput. These gains are enabled by recent advances in X-ray grating technologies. Two strong technology candidates are: critical angle transmission (used for the Lynx DRM) and off-plane reflection gratings. Both are fully feasible, currently at TRL 4, and have demonstrated high efficiencies and resolving powers of ~ 10,000 in recent X-ray tests.

=== Mission operations ===
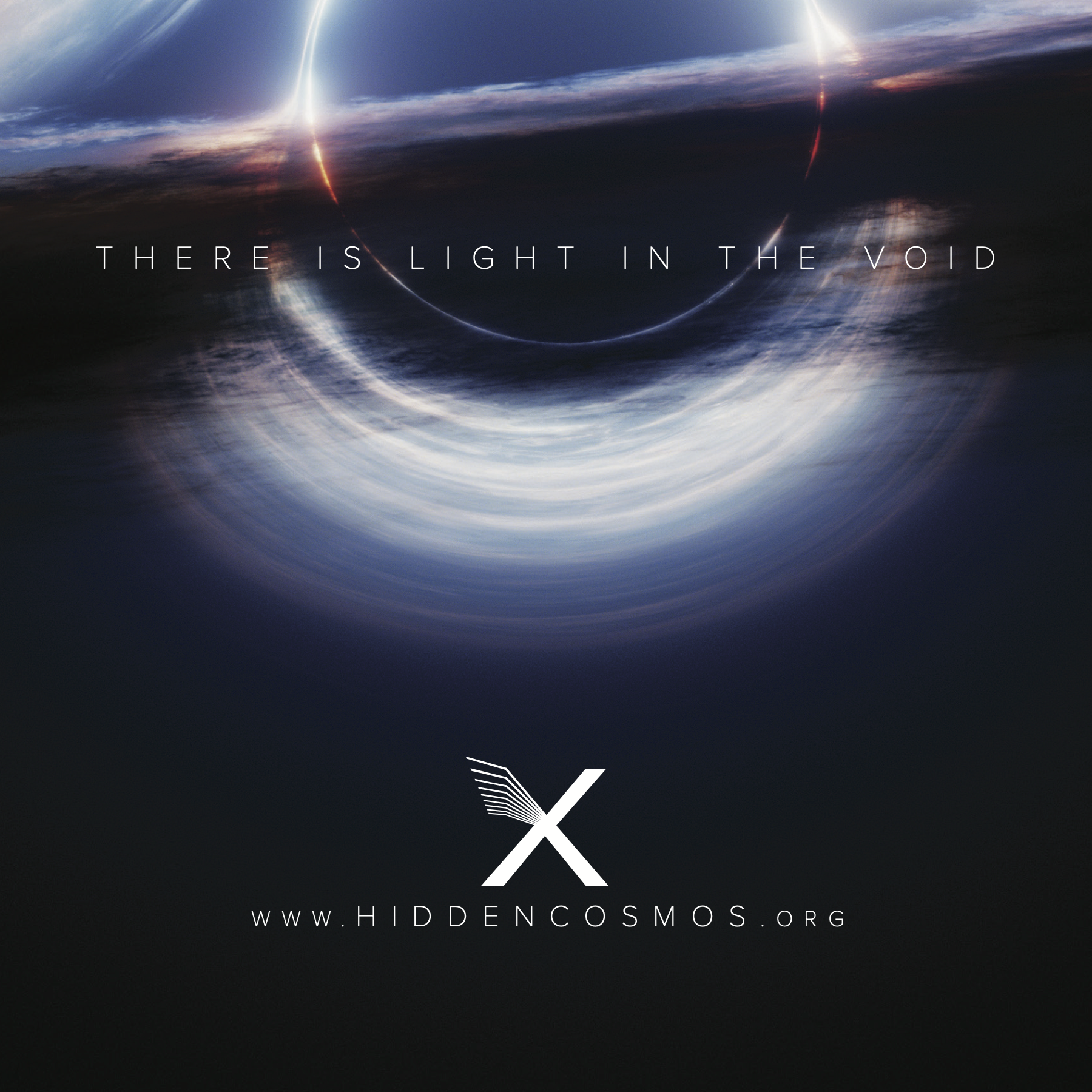
An example of public outreach and marketing campaign material created during the Lynx Concept Study.

The Chandra X-ray Observatory experience provides the blueprint for developing the systems required to operate Lynx, leading to a significant cost reduction relative to starting from scratch. This starts with a single prime contractor for the science and operations center, staffed by a team of scientists, engineers, and programmers. Many of the system designs, procedures, processes, and algorithms developed for Chandra will be directly applicable for Lynx, although all will be recast in a software/hardware environment appropriate for the 2030s and beyond.

The science impact of Lynx will be maximized by subjecting all of its proposed observations to peer review, including those related to the three science pillars. Time pre-allocation can be considered only for a small number of multi-purpose key programs, such as surveys in pre-selected regions of the sky. Such an open General Observer (GO) program approach has been successfully employed by large missions such as Hubble Space Telescope, Chandra X-ray Observatory, and Spitzer Space Telescope, and is planned for James Webb Space Telescope and Nancy Grace Roman Space Telescope. The Lynx GO program will have ample exposure time to achieve the objectives of its science pillars, make impacts across the astrophysical landscape, open new directions of inquiry, and produce as yet unimagined discoveries.

== Estimated cost ==
The cost of the Lynx X-ray Observatory is estimated to be between US$4.8 billion to US$6.2 billion (in FY20 dollars at 40% and 70% confidence levels, respectively). This estimated cost range includes the launch vehicle, cost reserves, and funding for five years of mission operations, while excluding potential foreign contributions (such as participation by the European Space Agency (ESA)). As described in Section 8.5 of the concept study's Final Report, the Lynx team commissioned five independent cost estimates, all of which arrived at similar estimates for the total mission lifecycle cost.

== See also ==
- Advanced Telescope for High Energy Astrophysics
- International X-ray Observatory
- Nuclear Spectroscopic Telescope Array (NuSTAR)
- List of proposed space observatories
