= Astronomy and Astrophysics Decadal Survey =

Review of astronomy literature produced every ten years

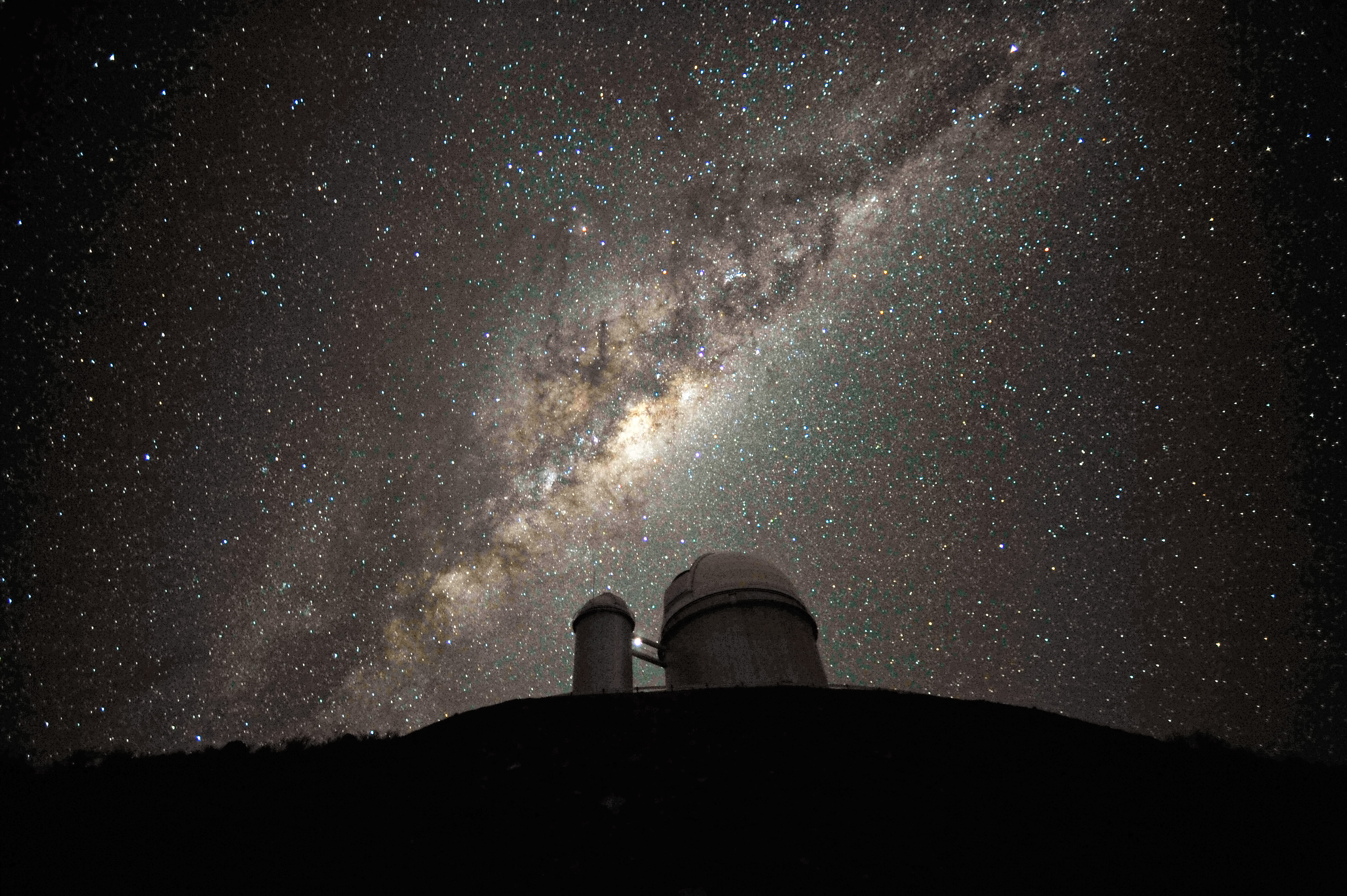
The Milky Way as viewed from La Silla Observatory

The Astronomy and Astrophysics Decadal Survey is a review of astronomy and astrophysics literature produced approximately every ten years by the National Research Council of the National Academy of Sciences in the United States. The report surveys the current state of the field, identifies research priorities, and makes recommendations for the coming decade. The decadal survey represents the recommendations of the research community to governmental agencies on how to prioritize scientific funding within astronomy and astrophysics. The editing committee is informed by topical panels and subcommittees, dedicated conferences, and direct community input in the form of white papers summarizing the state of the art in each subdiscipline. The most recent report, Astro2020, was released in 2021.

== Ground-Based Astronomy: A Ten-Year Program, 1964 ==
The first report, Ground-Based Astronomy: A Ten-Year Program, was released in 1964. The authoring committee was chaired by Albert Whitford. The report recommends construction of national observing facilities, including especially mid-sized ground-based optical telescopes.

== Astronomy and Astrophysics for the 1970s, 1972 ==
The second report, Astronomy and Astrophysics for the 1970s, was released in 1972. The committee was chaired by Jesse L. Greenstein. It recommends priorities for both space- and ground-based programs, and was instrumental in the eventual construction of the Very Large Array.

== Astronomy and Astrophysics for the 1980s, 1982 ==
The third report, Astronomy and Astrophysics for the 1980s, was released in 1982. The committee was chaired by George B. Field. It recommended the launch of the "Advanced X-Ray Astrophysics Facility", which was realized in 1999 as the Chandra X-ray Observatory. It also identified construction of the Very Long Baseline Array as a priority, in addition to briefly mentioning the Hubble Space Telescope (before it received that name) and the Shuttle Infrared Telescope Facility (later Spitzer).

== The Decade of Discovery in Astronomy and Astrophysics, 1991 ==
The fourth report, The Decade of Discovery in Astronomy and Astrophysics, was released in 1991. The committee was chaired by John N. Bahcall. It recommended the launch of the "Space Infrared Telescope Facility", realized in 2003 as the Spitzer Space Telescope, the fourth and final in NASA's Great Observatories program.

== Astronomy and Astrophysics in the New Millennium, 2001 ==
The fifth report, Astronomy and Astrophysics in the New Millennium, was released in 2001. The committee was co-chaired by Christopher McKee and Joseph H. Taylor. It gives highest priority to the construction and launch of Next Generation Space Telescope, now known as the James Webb Space Telescope which launched on 25 December 2021. The report reaffirms the 1991 recommendation for the completion of the Millimeter Array, now part of the Atacama Large Millimeter Array international collaboration. It also examines the benefits of a robust astronomy research program to the nation, and expresses concern regarding the percentage of funding tied to a few large projects.

== New Worlds, New Horizons in Astronomy and Astrophysics, 2010 ==
The sixth report, New Worlds, New Horizons in Astronomy and Astrophysics, was released in 2010. The committee was chaired by Roger D. Blandford. Recommendations for scientific questions to be answered include: the nature of dark energy; the structure, distribution, and evolution of exoplanetary systems; detailed examination of extreme processes including supernovae and the merger of superdense objects; and how galaxies and galaxy clusters formed from the early hot universe. The report also examines technical readiness, scheduling, and funding issues as well as basic science. The recommendations consider a range of funding scenarios based on projected budgets for the major funding agencies, NASA, the National Science Foundation, and the Department of Energy. The top priorities identified by the report include:

- Wide-Field Infrared Survey Telescope (WFIRST), now known as the Nancy Grace Roman Space Telescope, a space-based telescope to be located at Lagrangian point L2 that will survey and catalogue exoplanets and may help settle questions of the nature of dark energy.
- Large Synoptic Survey Telescope (LSST), now known as the Vera C. Rubin Observatory, a wide field ground-based telescope that will provide measurements of weak gravitational lensing and map and record transient or moving phenomena such as supernovae and near-Earth asteroids.
- New Worlds Technology Development Program to plan and lay the groundwork for future missions to study nearby Earth-like exoplanets
- Cerro Chajnantor Atacama Telescope (CCAT), a ground-based telescope sensitive in the millimeter and submillimeter range. CCAT will survey young dusty star systems and galaxies, and serve as a companion to Atacama Large Millimeter Array at the same site.

Other priorities include Laser Interferometer Space Antenna (LISA) for measuring gravitational waves and International X-ray Observatory for investigating black holes and the evolution of large scale structure in the universe. The report also recommends augmenting the Explorer program for small and medium-sized missions with rapid turnaround and high scientific return, and the creation of a Midscale Innovations Program within the National Science Foundation for funding projects in the $4–135 million range.

== Pathways to Discovery in Astronomy and Astrophysics for the 2020s ==
The seventh report was published in November 2021 and recommended scientific priorities and investments for the next decade to help achieve the following primary goals: search for habitable exoplanets and extraterrestrial life, study black holes and neutron stars and study the growth and evolution of galaxies. The top priority recommended to the NSF was to combine the Thirty Meter Telescope and Giant Magellan Telescope programs into one United States Extremely Large Telescope program. The top priority recommended to NASA was to establish a new Great Observatories Mission and Technology Maturation program that would conduct studies into 2030s-launched telescopes, with a hybrid of LUVOIR (successor to Hubble) and HabEx (successor to Spitzer) as the first major project with an estimated cost of US$11 billion, to be followed by cheaper far-infrared astronomy and X-ray astronomy designs (the Origins Space Telescope and Lynx X-ray Observatory) with an estimated cost from US$3 billion to US$5 billion each. Additionally, the report recommended the establishment of a new class in the Explorers Program filling the gap between flagship missions and Medium-Class Explorers. NASA formally endorsed and initiated the plans in 2024.

== See also ==
- Earth Science Decadal Survey
- Enduring Quests and Daring Visions
- List of astronomical societies
- Planetary Science Decadal Survey
- Solar and Space Physics Decadal Survey
