= Daisuke Nagai =

Japanese-American astrophysicist

- Education: University of Michigan (BS, 1999); University of Chicago (MS, 2001; PhD, 2005)
- Known for: Galaxy cluster cosmology; Omega500 simulations; Non-thermal pressure in the intracluster medium
- Awards: IUPAP Young Scientist Prize in Astrophysics (2011); Cottrell Scholar Award (2012); Stephen Murray Distinguished Visiting Lectureship (2018)
- Scientific career
- Fields: Cosmology; Astrophysics
- Workplaces: California Institute of Technology; Yale University
- Thesis: Sunyaev-Zeldovich Scaling Relations in Cosmological Cluster Simulations (2005)
- Doctoral advisor: John Carlstrom; Andrey Kravtsov
- Website: astro.yale.edu/nagai

Daisuke Nagai is a Japanese-American astrophysicist and Professor of Physics and Astronomy at Yale University. He is a computational cosmologist whose research focuses on the physics of galaxy clusters, utilizing supercomputer simulations to model the formation of cosmic structures and their applications as probes of dark matter and dark energy.

== Education and early career ==
Nagai received his Bachelor of Science in Physics and Mathematics from the University of Michigan in 1999. He earned his M.S. (2001) and Ph.D. (2005) in Astronomy and Astrophysics from the University of Chicago, where he worked with John Carlstrom and Andrey Kravtsov at the Kavli Institute for Cosmological Physics. His dissertation, Sunyaev-Zeldovich Scaling Relations in Cosmological Cluster Simulations, focused on using the Sunyaev–Zeldovich effect to study galaxy clusters in a ΛCDM universe.

Following his doctorate, Nagai held the Sherman Fairchild Postdoctoral Prize Fellowship at the California Institute of Technology from 2005 to 2008.

== Career ==
Nagai joined the faculty of Yale University in 2008 as an Assistant Professor of Physics. He was promoted to Associate Professor with tenure in 2014 and to full Professor of Physics and Astronomy in 2022.

At Yale, Nagai became a founding faculty co-director of the Yale Center for Research Computing (YCRC), where he helped establish the university's core research computing infrastructure and academic programs in computational science.

== Research ==
Nagai's research lies at the intersection of theoretical and computational cosmology and multi-wavelength observational astrophysics. He develops and uses large-scale cosmological hydrodynamical simulations to model the formation and evolution of galaxy clusters, and applies these models to interpret observational data from X-ray, Sunyaev–Zeldovich (SZ), optical, and ultraviolet surveys.

=== Intracluster medium and non-thermal pressure ===
A central focus of Nagai's work is the thermodynamics of the intracluster medium (ICM). He is known for characterizing non-thermal pressure support—the pressure contribution from turbulent gas motions and bulk flows—which is a significant systematic uncertainty in hydrostatic mass estimates of galaxy clusters. This work is critical for the use of galaxy clusters as precision cosmological probes and for interpreting data from X-ray observatories such as Chandra and SZ surveys.

=== Omega500 simulations ===
Nagai's group developed the Omega500 cosmological hydrodynamical simulations, a suite of simulations of galaxy clusters that has been widely used to study ICM physics, calibrate mass–observable scaling relations, and quantify systematic biases in cluster-based cosmological analyses.

=== X-ray cluster mass calibration ===
Nagai's work with collaborators including Alexey Vikhlinin established methods for testing X-ray measurements of cluster properties against cosmological simulations, improving the reliability of cluster mass calibration for cosmological surveys.

=== Dark matter self-interactions ===
Nagai has also contributed to research on constraining self-interacting dark matter using galaxy cluster mergers. His work with Richard Massey and others developed statistical methods using substructure infall into galaxy clusters to measure the dark matter interaction cross-section.

=== Data science and machine learning ===
More recently, Nagai's group has applied machine learning and data science techniques to cosmological problems, including the development of interpretable machine learning methods for precision cluster cosmology.

== Selected publications ==
- Nagai, Daisuke; Kravtsov, Andrey V.; Vikhlinin, Alexey (2007). "Effects of Galaxy Formation on Thermodynamics of the Intracluster Medium". The Astrophysical Journal. 668 (1): 1–14. arXiv:astro-ph/0703661. doi:10.1086/521328.
- Nagai, Daisuke; Vikhlinin, Alexey; Kravtsov, Andrey V. (2007). "Testing X-Ray Measurements of Galaxy Clusters with Cosmological Simulations". The Astrophysical Journal. 655 (1): 98–108. arXiv:astro-ph/0609247. doi:10.1086/509868.
- Lau, Erwin T.; Nagai, Daisuke; Nelson, Kaylea (2013). "Weighing Galaxy Clusters with Gas. II. On the Mass–Non-thermal Pressure Scaling Relation". The Astrophysical Journal. 777 (2): 151. arXiv:1308.2963. doi:10.1088/0004-637X/777/2/151.

== Awards and honors ==
- Stephen Murray Distinguished Visiting Lectureship, Harvard-Smithsonian Center for Astrophysics (2018)
- Cottrell Scholar Award, Research Corporation for Science Advancement (2012)
- IUPAP Young Scientist Prize in Astrophysics (2011), "for ground-breaking research that has significantly improved our understanding of the structure and evolution of galaxy clusters and their application for cosmology"
