= Advanced X-ray Imaging Satellite =

Proposed NASA space telescope

AXIS
- Mission type: Space observatory
- Operator: NASA
- Website: axis.umd.edu
- Mission duration: 5 years primary

Start of mission
- Launch date: 2032 (planned)
- Launch site: Kennedy Space Center

Orbital parameters
- Reference system: Low Earth Orbit

Main telescope
- Type: X-Ray
- Focal length: 9 metres
- Collecting area: 0.36 m^{2} (4 sq ft) at 1 keV
- Wavelengths: X-ray: 0.3-10 keV
- Resolution: 1.5 arcseconds across the entire field of view

Advanced X-ray Imaging Satellite (AXIS) was a proposed space telescope. It was proposed to NASA in 2026 when it was expected to launch in 2032. It is designed for high angular resolution X-ray imaging. The mission goals are to examine galaxies over cosmic time, feedback in galaxies, black hole strong gravity, dual active galactic nucleus, the high redshift universe.

== History ==
The Advanced X-ray Imaging Satellite (AXIS) was proposed in response to NASA's Astrophysics Probe Explorer (APEX) program.

The project was cancelled in March 2026.

== Instruments ==
The X-ray grazing incident mirror would be developed by NASA Goddard Space Flight Center and combines 10,000 mirror segments made from silicon, grouped into 10 shells. The detector is an array of CCDs giving a field of view of about 24 arcminutes and a spatial resolution of about 1.5 arcsecond over the entire field.

== See also ==
- List of proposed space observatories
- International X-ray Observatory
