= Alexey Vikhlinin =

Russian-American astrophysicist (born 1970)

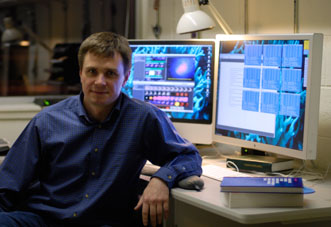
- Born: September 17, 1970 (age 55); Ryazan, Russian SSR
- Occupation: Astrophysicist
- Employer: Smithsonian Astrophysical Observatory
- Known for: X-ray Astronomy, Cosmology, Lynx X-ray Observatory
- Website: https://hea-www.harvard.edu/~alexey/about.html

Alexey Vikhlinin (born September 17, 1970) is a Russian-American astrophysicist notable for achievements in the astrophysics of high energy phenomenon, namely galaxy cluster cosmology and the design of space-based X-ray observatories. He is currently a senior astrophysicist at the Smithsonian Astrophysical Observatory, part of the Center for Astrophysics | Harvard & Smithsonian in Cambridge, Massachusetts. He was recently the Science and Technology Definition Team (STDT) Community Co-chair (along with Feryal Özel) for the Lynx X-ray Observatory, a NASA-funded Large Mission Concept Study under consideration by the 2020 Decadal Survey on Astronomy and Astrophysics.

== Biography ==
Born in Ryazan, Russia on September 17, 1970, Vikhlinin was educated at the Moscow Institute of Physics and Technology, graduating in 1993 with a degree in Space Physics. He received his Doctor of Philosophy in Astronomy from the Russian Institute for Space Research in 1995, and a Doctor of Sciences from the Russian Academy of Sciences in 2003. His doctoral research was partly advised by celebrated astrophysicist Rashid Sunyaev. He joined the Smithsonian Astrophysical Observatory (SAO) initially as a postdoctoral fellow in 1996, later becoming an astrophysicist at the Chandra X-ray Center (also part of SAO) and then a senior astrophysicist and deputy associate director of SAO's High Energy Astrophysics Division in 2013. He maintains an affiliation with the Institute for Space Research in Moscow as a senior researcher.

Vikhlinin is the author of more than 200 refereed publications, including several highly cited papers in the field of galaxy cluster cosmology. He is the recipient of the Zeldovich medal from International Committee on Space Research (COSPAR), the State Prize of the Russian Federation, and the Rossi Prize from the American Astronomical Society (AAS) for his work on observational cosmology and galaxy cluster physics with the Chandra X-ray Observatory.

He was elected a Legacy Fellow of the American Astronomical Society in 2020.
