= Jessica Gaskin =

American astrophysicist

Jessica Gaskin is an American astrophysicist at NASA Marshall Space Flight Center, where she leads the X-ray Astronomy Group X-Ray Astronomy at Marshall Space Flight Center. She was the lead author on the conceptual study of the Lynx X-ray Observatory, a Large Mission Concept Study space-based X-ray telescope submitted to the Decadal Survey for prioritization.

== Education ==
Gaskin earned a B.S. in Physics and Astrophysics from the New Mexico Institute of Mining and Technology before receiving an M.S. in astronomy from Case Western Reserve University. She then earned a PhD in physics from the University of Alabama in Huntsville.

== Awards and honors ==
- 2021 NASA Silver Achievement Medal
- 2019 NASA MSFC Innovation Peer Award
- 2014 NASA Honor Award for Early Career Achievement Medal
