= Astrophysics Strategic Mission Concept Studies =

Program within NASA

Astrophysics Strategic Mission Concept Studies [AMSCS] is a program within the National Aeronautics and Space Administration agency of the United States government for possible projects leading to probable prospective missions.

== History ==
Pre-proposal workshops were held in October 2007. The Astrophysics Strategic Mission Concept Studies (ASMCS) awards were made in the spring of 2008.

== Exoplanets ==
Proposals for the study of planets external to the Solar System include; the evaluation of the most effective means for the direct studies of exoplanets provided affirmation for the use of starshades. Planet Hunter Deep search of 65 nearby stars for Earth analogs. Mark Clampin/Goddard Space flight centre - Extrasolar planet imaging coronograph-to produce fundamental physical characteristics of giant planets in other planetary systems. Detecting Extrasolar Planets by Sharing the Burden

=== ACCESS, Actively Corrected Coronagraph Exoplanet System Studies ===
The actively corrected coronograph for exoplanet system studies. The principal investigator of this project is J.Trauger working at the California Jet propulsion laboratory.

=== PECO, Pupil Mapping Exoplanet Coronograph ===
Pupil mapping exoplanet coronograph is a 1.4 metre optical telescope fitted with a phase-induced amplitude apodization coronagraph, to image and characterize nearby exoplanets and zodiacal dust in stars zones considered to contain planets habitable to possible life. The main investigator is Olivier Guyon from the University of Arizona.

=== DAViNCI, Dilute Aperture Visible Nulling Coronograph ===
Dilute aperture visible nulling coronograph project is a 1.1 metre telescope array. The lead investigator is Michael Shao.

== Additional proposals ==
- James Adams/National Space Science and Orbiting Centre: Orbiting Astronomical Spectrometer in Space. The goal of the OASIS mission is to identify the site and sites where Galactic cosmic ray originate and are accelerated.
- Roger Brissenden /Smithsonian Astrophysical Observatory: A concept of the technology required for Generation X: A Large Area and High resolution X-ray observatory to study the early universe. The gen-x mission is designed to observe the first black-holes and stars at redshift z~10-20.And will trace the evolution through cosmic time of galaxies and there elements using X-ray spectroscopy.
- Jonathan Grindlay/Harvard: The Energetic X-ray Imaging Survey Telescope (EXIST). A mission design optimized for the study of high-z GRBs as probes of the early Universe.
- The Dark Ages Lunar Interferometer (DALI). A Moon-based telescope concept, funded under the Astrophysics Strategic Mission Concept Study program, intended to observe the highly-redshifted hyperfine (21-cm) transition from neutral hydrogen (H I) in the intergalactic medium at z 30.

== See also ==
- Advanced Technology Large-Aperture Space Telescope
- Redshift
- NASA Institute for Advanced Concepts
- DARPA
