= Feryal Özel =

Turkish-American astronomer

- Born: May 27, 1975 (age 50); Istanbul, Turkey
- Education: Columbia University (BS); Harvard University (PhD)
- Scientific career
- Fields: Astrophysics
- Thesis: "The Effects of Strong Magnetic and Gravitational Fields on Neutron Star Atmospheres"
- Doctoral advisor: Ramesh Narayan (astrophysicist)
- Website: http://xtreme.as.arizona.edu/~fozel/

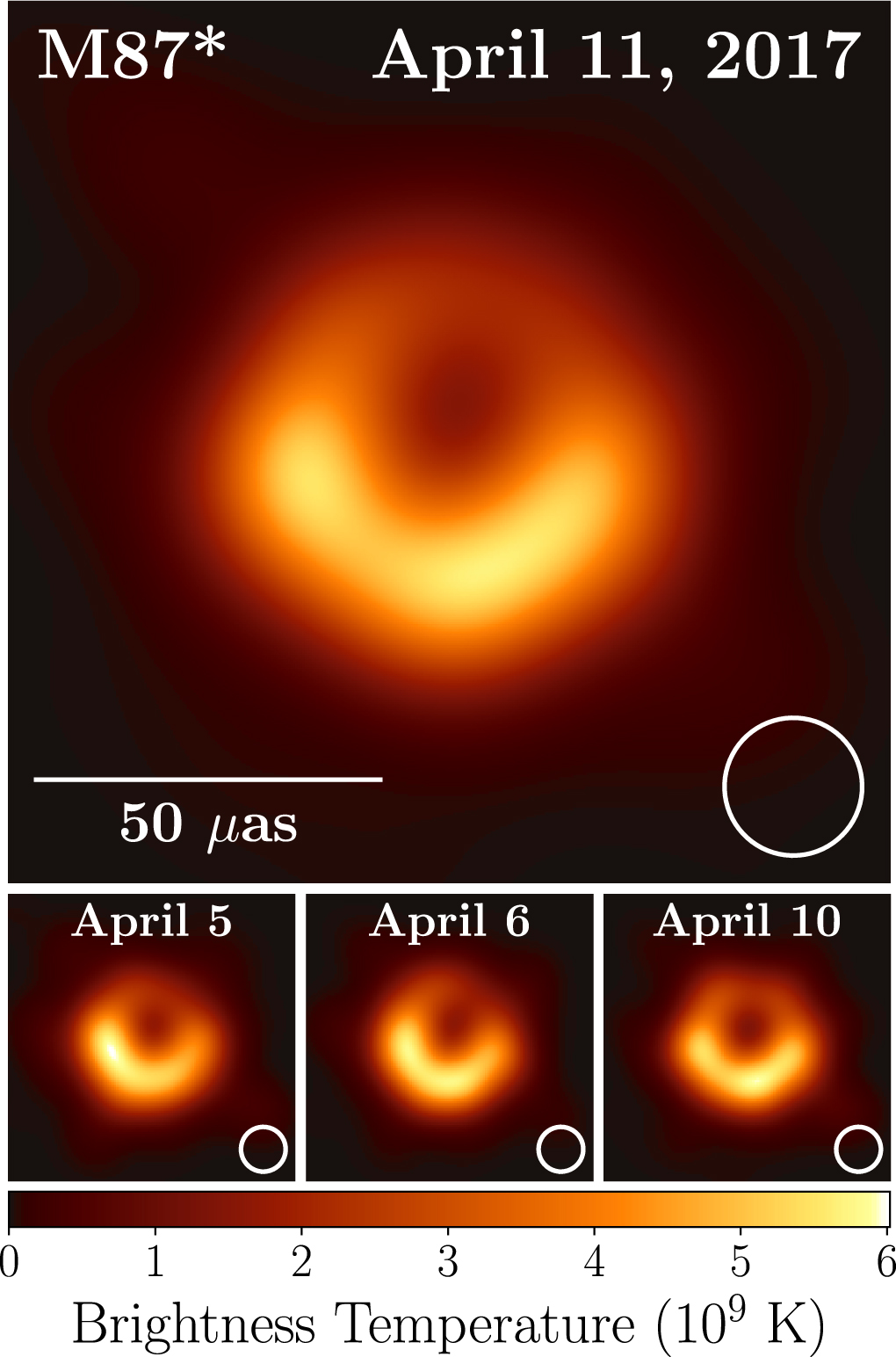
Image of the supermassive black hole at the center of the galaxy M87, obtained by the Event Horizon Telescope Collaboration. Prof. Özel is part of the EHT team as of 2020.

Feryal Özel (born May 27, 1975) is a Turkish American astrophysicist born in Istanbul, Turkey, specializing in the physics of compact objects and high energy astrophysical phenomena. As of 2022, Özel is the department chair and a professor at the Georgia Institute of Technology School of Physics in Atlanta. She was previously a professor at the University of Arizona in Tucson, in the Astronomy Department and Steward Observatory.

Özel graduated summa cum laude from Columbia University's Fu Foundation School of Engineering and Applied Science and received her PhD at Harvard University with Ramesh Narayan acting as Thesis advisor. She was a Hubble Fellow and member at the Institute for Advanced Study in Princeton, New Jersey. She was a Fellow at the Harvard-Radcliffe Institute and a visiting professor at the Miller Institute at UC Berkeley.

Özel is widely recognized for her contributions to the field of neutron stars, black holes, and magnetars. She is the Modeling lead and member of the Event Horizon Telescope (EHT) that released the first image of a black hole.

Özel received the Maria Goeppert Mayer award from the American Physical Society in 2013 for her outstanding contributions to neutron star astrophysics. Özel has appeared on numerous TV documentaries including Big Ideas on PBS and the Universe series in the History Channel.

Along with Alexey Vikhlinin, Özel is the Science and Technology Definition Team Community Co-chair for the Lynx X-ray Observatory NASA Large Mission Concept Study.

== Education ==
The following list summarizes Prof. Özel's education path:

- 1992 - Üsküdar American Academy, İstanbul, Turkey
- 1996 - BSc in Physics and Applied Mathematics, Columbia University, New York City
- 1997 - MSc in Physics, Niels Bohr Institute, Copenhagen
- 2002 - PhD in Astrophysics, Harvard University, Cambridge, USA

== Honors and awards ==
- Breakthrough Prize, 2020
- Chair, Astrophysics Advisory Committee (APAC), NASA, 2019
- Fellowship, John Simon Guggenheim Memorial Foundation, 2016
- Visiting Miller Professorship, University of California Berkeley, 2014
- Maria Goeppert Mayer Award, American Physical Society, 2013
- Fellowship, Radcliffe Institute for Advanced Studies, 2012-2013
- Bart J. Bok Prize, Harvard University, 2010
- Lucas Award, San Diego Astronomy Association, 2010
- Visiting Scholar Fellowship, Turkish Scientific and Technical Research Foundation, 2007
- Hubble Postdoctoral Fellowship, 2002–2005
- Distinguished Scholar Award, Daughters of Atatürk Foundation, 2003
- Keck Fellowship, Institute for Advanced Study, 2002
- Van Vleck Fellowship, Harvard University, 1999
- Kostrup Prize, Niels Bohr Institute, 1997
- Niels Bohr Institute Graduate Fellowship, 1996–1997
- Applied Mathematics Faculty Award, Columbia University, 1996
- Fu Foundation Scholarship, Columbia University, 1994–1996
- Research Fellowship, CERN, 1995
- Turkish Health and Education Foundation Scholarship, 1992-1994
