= Aki Roberge =

Research Astrophysicist at NASA's Goddard Space Flight Center

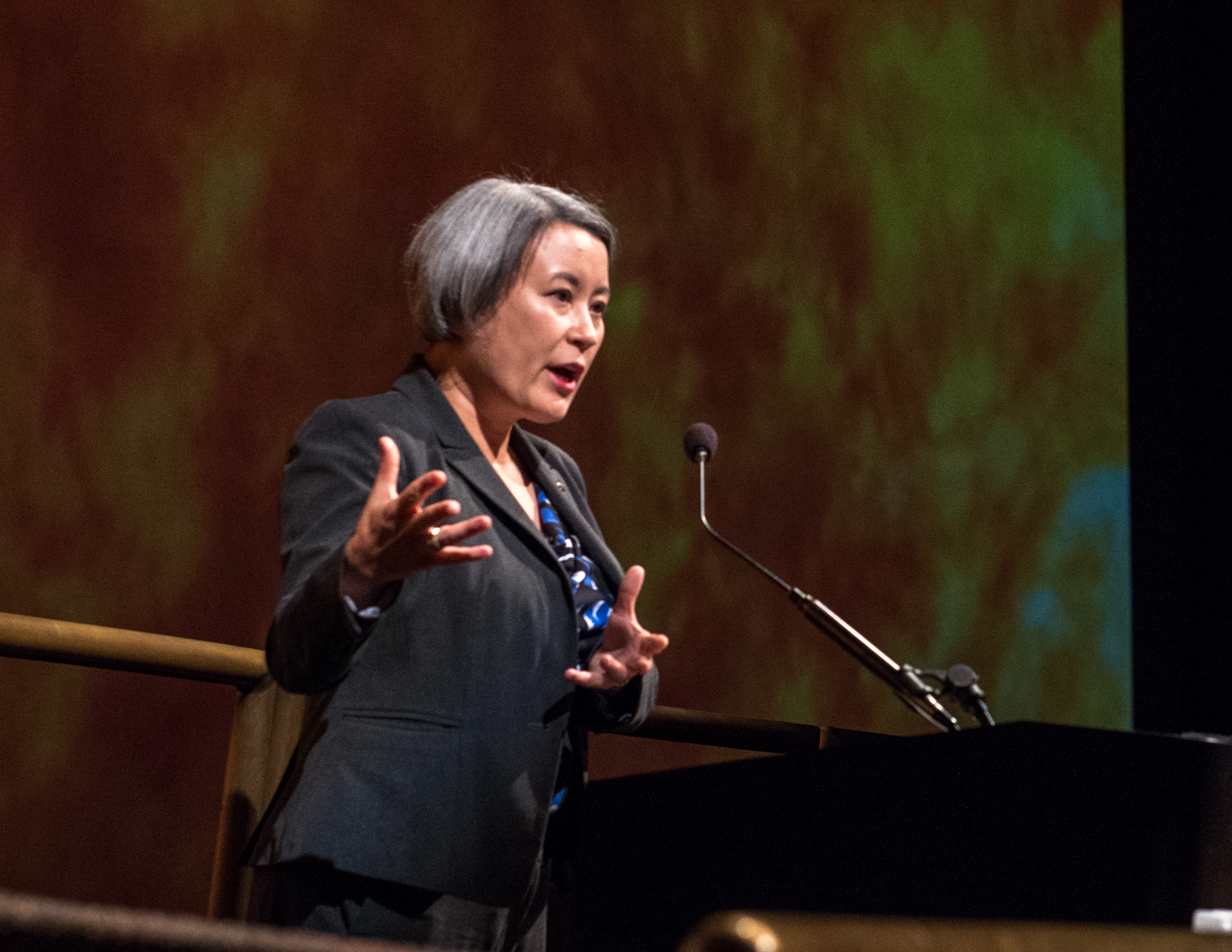
- Dr Aki Roberge lecturing at the National Air and Space Museum in 2016.
- Born: c. 1973 (age 52–53); Kyoto, Japan
- Citizenship: USA
- Education: Massachusetts Institute of Technology, Johns Hopkins University
- Known for: Debris disks, LUVOIR
- Scientific career
- Workplaces: Carnegie Institution for Science, NASA
- Thesis: [ProQuest 305315892 Ultraviolet spectroscopy of circumstellar disks] (2003)
- Doctoral advisor: Paul D. Feldman
- Other academic advisors: Jim Elliot, Alycia J. Weinberger

Dr Aki Roberge (born c. 1973) is a research astrophysicist at NASA’s Goddard Space Flight Center, where she is currently the Associate Director for Technology and Strategy. Her research focuses on observational studies of debris disks and planet formation around nearby young stars, with an aim to be able to characterize planets around other stars, perhaps even to find signs of life on them. She is particularly known for her research on the debris disk around Beta Pictoris.

== Early life and education ==
Born in Kyoto, Japan, to an American potter and a Japanese Chemical engineer, Roberge grew up in a rural community in Vermont and was exposed to science in high school. She earned a bachelor's degree in Physics with a minor in Planetary science from the Massachusetts Institute of Technology in 1996 with Jim Elliot (discoverer of the rings of Uranus) and a PhD in Astrophysics from Johns Hopkins University in 2002. Her thesis work, conducted under the guidance of Hopkins Professor Paul D. Feldman, was titled "Ultraviolet spectroscopy of circumstellar disks". She went on to conduct postdoctoral research at the Carnegie Institution for Science with Alycia J. Weinberger before taking a position at NASA's Goddard Space Flight Center in 2005.

== NASA work ==
Her early work at NASA continued to focus on debris disks, in particular Beta Pictoris, for which she is a recognized expert. Her work was crucial in demonstrating its extreme carbon-rich nature, and later in studying the carbon monoxide gas clouds indicating swarms of colliding comets in the young system.

In 2013 she served as one of the members of the study that produced a 30-year roadmap for NASA astrophysics. Her work has included substantial contributions to mission concept development, in particular being deeply involved in developing future space missions for exoplanet detection, including the starshade approach to blocking starlight.

=== LUVOIR ===
From 2016 to 2019 she served as the Study Scientist for the Large Ultraviolet Optical Infrared Surveyor (LUVOIR) mission concept, a multi-wavelength space telescope design developed by NASA as one of four large astrophysics space mission concepts studied in preparation for the National Academy of Sciences 2020 Astronomy and Astrophysics Decadal Survey. A primary aim of LUVOIR is to enable the investigation of a wide range of exoplanets, specifically to be able to discern those that might be habitable or even inhabited. Under Roberge's leadership LUVOIR was also designed with broader capabilities to build on and surpass those of the Hubble Space Telescope, James Webb Space Telescope, and Nancy Grace Roman Space Telescope, enabling groundbreaking studies of the early universe, galaxy formation and evolution, star and planet formation, and Solar System bodies. This concept was compelling enough that, in 2021, a mission aligned with these goals was selected as the top priority large space mission for NASA to build across the following decades.

From 2020 to 2021 Roberge was the Deputy Program Scientist for the Nancy Grace Roman Space Telescope, during which time she worked on a team to document the connection between Roman's coronagraph and LUVOIR needs. Since 2022 she has been the Associate Director for Technology and Strategy in Astrophysics at Goddard.

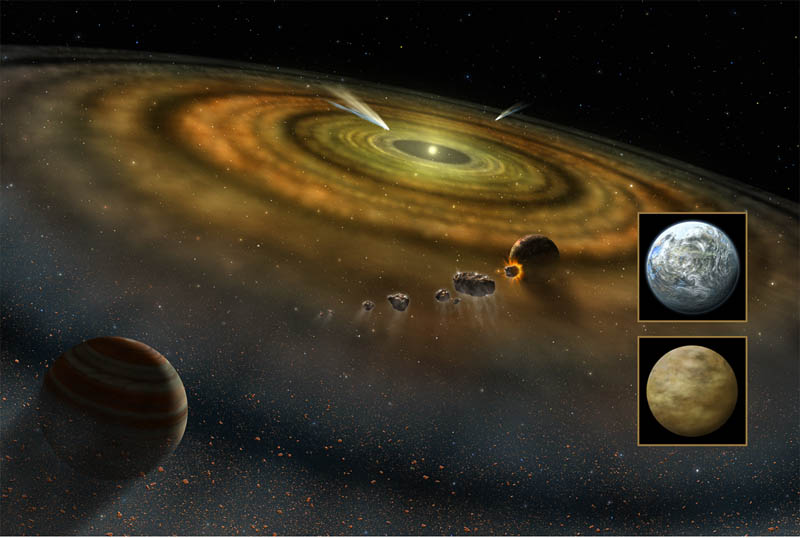
Roberge is a noted expert on debris disks, especially for studies of the disk around Beta Pictoris.
