= Olivier Guyon =

American physicist

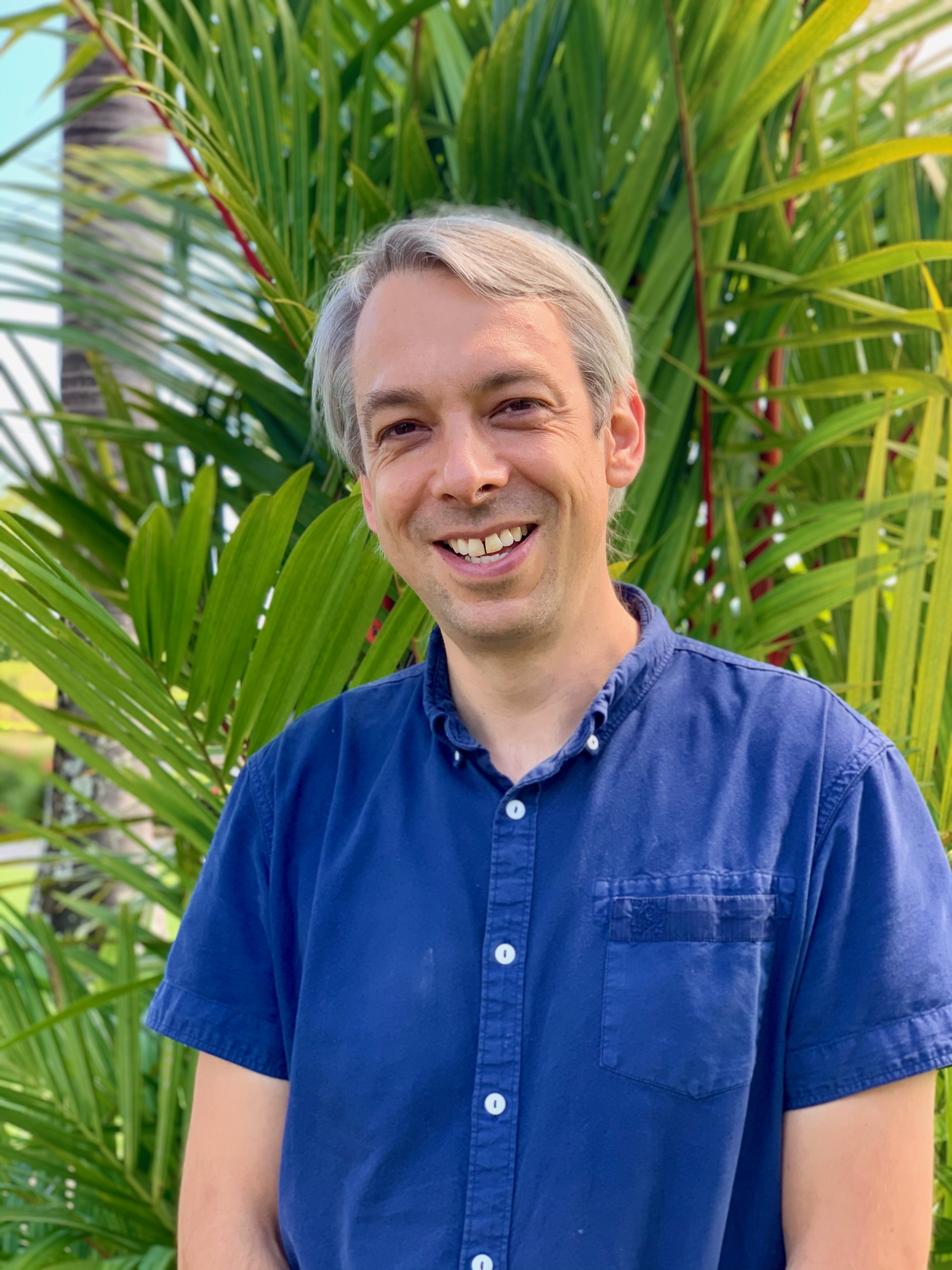
- Guyon in 2012
- Born: 1975 (age 50–51)
- Citizenship: United States
- Education: Université Pierre et Marie Curie Ph. D.
- Awards: MacArthur Fellowship (2012)
- Scientific career
- Fields: Astronomy

Olivier Guyon (born 1975) is a French-American astronomer. He is an astronomer at the Steward Observatory of the college of science and professor in the James C. Wyant College of Optical Sciences, both of The University of Arizona. He is the SCExAO Project Scientist at the Subaru Telescope. Guyon was awarded a MacArthur Fellowship "Genius Grant" in 2012.

Guyon designs telescopes and other astronomical instrumentation that aid in the search for exoplanets planets outside the Solar System. Specifically, coronagraphs and extreme adaptive optics.

Guyon developed the PANOPTES project, a citizen science project that aims to make it easy for anyone to build a low cost, robotic telescope that can be used to detect transiting exoplanets.
