= Origins Space Telescope =

Proposed NASA far-infrared space observatory to study the early Universe

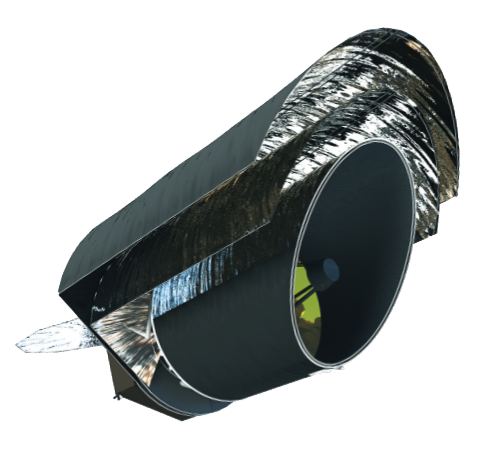
- Early design of the mirror and focal plane instruments
- Names: Origins, OST
- Mission type: Space telescope
- Operator: NASA
- Website: asd.gsfc.nasa.gov/firs/

Start of mission
- Launch date: 2035 (proposed)

Orbital parameters
- Reference system: Sun-Earth L2

Main telescope
- Wavelengths: Far infrared

Origins Space Telescope (Origins) is a concept study for a far-infrared survey space telescope mission. A preliminary concept in pre-formulation, it was presented to the United States Decadal Survey in 2019 for a possible selection to NASA's large strategic science missions. Origins would provide an array of new tools for studying star formation and the energetics and physical state of the interstellar medium within the Milky Way using infrared radiation and new spectroscopic capabilities.

Study groups, primarily composed of international community members, prioritized the science identification and science drivers of the mission architecture. The study groups drew upon input from the international astronomical community; such a large mission will need international participation and support to make it a reality.

== Overview ==
In 2016, NASA began considering four different space telescopes for the Large strategic science missions; they are the Habitable Exoplanet Imaging Mission (HabEx), Large Ultraviolet Optical Infrared Surveyor (LUVOIR), Origins Space Telescope (Origins), and Lynx X-ray Observatory. In 2019, the four teams turned in their final reports to the National Academy of Sciences, whose independent Astronomy and Astrophysics Decadal Survey report advises NASA on which mission should take top priority. If funded, Origins would launch in approximately 2035.

== An evolving concept ==
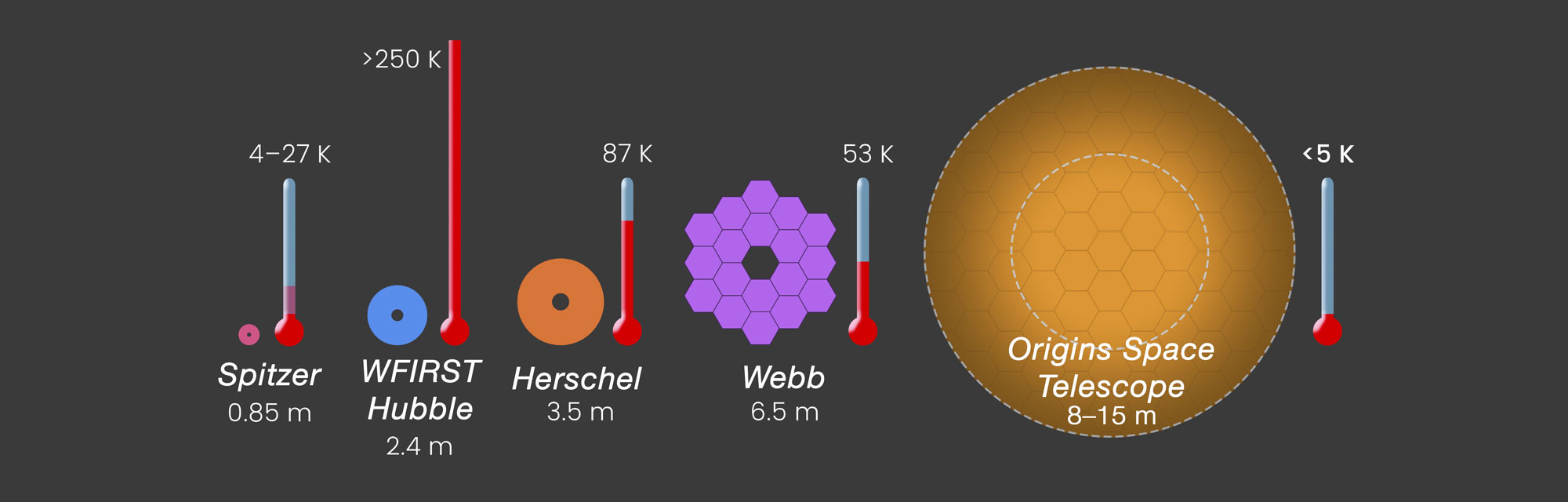
Diagram of the envisioned mirror diameter of the Origins Space Telescope.

The Roadmap envisaged a mid- to far-infrared space telescope (contrasting with the near- to mid-infrared James Webb Space Telescope) with a large gain in sensitivity over the Herschel Space Observatory (a previous far-infrared telescope), and better angular resolution with at least a four-order of magnitude sensitivity improvement over Herschel. The mission development relies on the identification of primary science drivers to establish the technical requirements for the observatory. The workgroups have identified these baseline science topics:

- Cosmic dawn and reionization
- Evolution of galaxies and black holes
- Volume of local galaxies and the Milky Way
- Interstellar medium
- Protoplanetary disks, planet formation, exoplanets, star formation, and evolved stars
- The Solar System.

=== Water transport ===
Early and preliminary goals for the Origins Space Telescope mission include the study of water transport as both ice and gas from the interstellar medium to the inner regions of planet-forming disks, from interstellar clouds, to protoplanetary disks, to Earth itself—in order to understand the abundance and availability of water for habitable planets. In the Solar System, it will chart the role of comets in delivering water to the early Earth by tracing their molecular heredity of deuterium/hydrogen ratio.

== Preliminary characteristics ==
The Origins Space Telescope would perform astrometry and astrophysics in the mid- to far-infrared range using a telescope with an aperture of 9.1 m (concept 1) or 5.9 m (concept 2). The telescope will require cryocooler systems to actively cool detectors at ~50 mK and the telescope optics at ~4 K. It will attain sensitivities 100–1000 times greater than any previous far-infrared telescope.

Targeting exoplanet observations in the 3.3–25 μm wavelength range, it will measure the temperatures and search for basic chemical ingredients for life in the atmospheres of small, warm planets at habitable temperatures (~300 K (27 °C)) and measure their atmospheric composition. This may be accomplished by a combination of transit spectroscopy and direct coronagraphic imaging. Important atmospheric diagnostics include spectral bands of ammonia (NH_{4}, a unique tracer of nitrogen), the 9 μm ozone line (ozone, O_{3} is a key biosignature), the 15 μm CO_{2} band (carbon dioxide is an important greenhouse gas), and many water wavelength bands.

Its spectrographs will enable 3D surveys of the sky that will discover and characterize the most distant galaxies, Milky-Way, exoplanets, and the outer reaches of the Solar System.

== Preliminary payload ==
Based on the final report, three instruments are required, plus a fourth optional upscope:

1. a far-infrared imaging polarimeter
2. a mid-infrared instrument for exoplanet transit spectroscopy
3. a versatile far-infrared spectrometer with wide-field low-resolution or single-beam high-resolution capability
4. a very high-resolution heterodyne spectrometer.
