= Habitable Worlds Observatory =

Proposed NASA space telescope to search for habitable exoplanets and signs of life

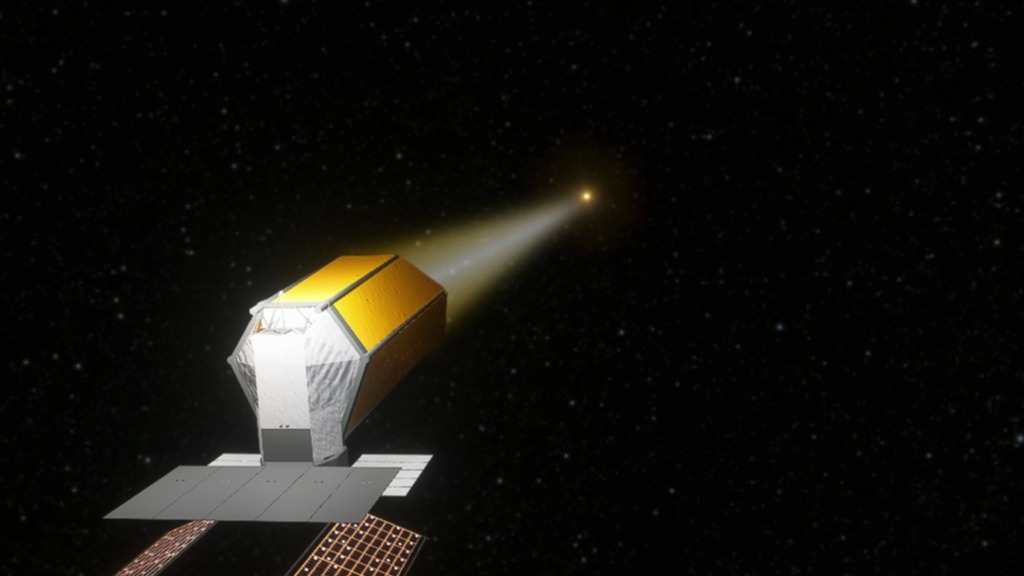
- Mission type: Space telescope
- Operator: NASA
- Website: https://habitableworldsobservatory.org/home

Start of mission
- Launch date: 2040s

Orbital parameters
- Reference system: Sun-Earth L_{2} orbit (proposed by NASA)

The Habitable Worlds Observatory (HWO) is a proposed flagship space telescope for NASA Astrophysics that will build on the achievements of the Hubble, James Webb, and Nancy Grace Roman space telescopes. Intended to search for signs of life on Earth-like exoplanets, HWO will observe the sky in ultraviolet, optical, and infrared wavelengths to explore the origin of galaxies and elements, and habitability of exoplanets.

Its primary mission would be to search for and image Earth-size exoplanets in the habitable zones of their stars, where liquid water can exist, by using a coronagraph or a starshade to block out the light of their stars. The proposed launch date is in the 2040s. The estimated cost is at least $11 billion. On April 3, 2026, the Trump administration released the 2027 budget proposal for NASA, requesting $5 million for HWO, down from the $150 million enacted by Congress in FY 2026.

== Mission goals ==
Artist's concept of one design for the proposed Habitable Worlds Observatory created in May 2024

HWO's main objective would be to identify and directly image at least 25 potentially habitable worlds. It would then use spectroscopy to search for chemical biosignatures in these planets' atmospheres, including gases such as oxygen and methane, which could serve as critical evidence for life. HWO would also use its high sensitivity and resolution capabilities to trace the evolution of galaxies and other cosmic structures.

The primary objectives for HWO are:

- Living worlds – search for life
- Drivers of galaxy growth – show how galaxies change over the lifetime of the universe
- Evolution of elements over cosmic time – study how elements arise in stars and are redistributed
- Solar System in its galactic context – study objects in the Solar System

== Development ==
Three of the Engineering Architecture Concepts (EACs) for HWO.

The concept for HWO came out of two earlier ideas called the Large Ultraviolet Optical Infrared Surveyor and Habitable Exoplanets Observatory both part of Next Great Observatories program. HWO was officially recommended in 2020 by the National Academies' Decadal Survey on Astronomy and Astrophysics. In 2023, the National Aeronautics and Space Administration (NASA) established a Great Observatory Maturation Program (GOMAP) to unite government, industry, and academia to develop the technologies needed for HWO. GOMAP aims to draw on lessons from previous NASA missions to streamline development of the HWO concept and decrease budget and schedule risks for the future mission.

The HWO is intended to be launched on a super heavy-lift launch vehicle such as SpaceX's Starship, Blue Origin's New Glenn or the SLS. Current mission concepts for the HWO include a 6–8-meter primary mirror; however, larger mirrors could be possible if launch-vehicle technology advances by the time of its launch in the 2040s.

On January 5, 2026, NASA announced the selection of industry proposals to advance technologies for the agency’s Habitable Worlds Observatory concept. The announcement was made by NASA administrator Jared Isaacman, who stated:

The Habitable Worlds Observatory is exactly the kind of bold, forward-leaning science that only NASA can undertake. Humanity is waiting for the breakthroughs this mission is capable of achieving and the questions it could help us answer about life in the universe. We intend to move with urgency, and expedite timelines to the greatest extent possible to bring these discoveries to the world.
