= Point source (disambiguation) =

A point source is a localised, relatively small source of something.

Point source may also refer to:

- Point source (pollution), a localised (small) source of pollution
  - Point source water pollution, water pollution with a localized source
- Point mass, a point source of gravitational field
