= Ramesh Narayan (astrophysicist) =

Indian-American theoretical astrophysicist

- Born: 1950 (age 75–76); Mumbai
- Citizenship: American
- Known for: Theoretical Astrophysics: accretion processes on black holes
- Scientific career
- Institutions: Harvard University
- Thesis: (1979)

Ramesh Narayan (born in Mumbai, India, in 1950) is an Indian-American theoretical astrophysicist, currently the Thomas Dudley Cabot Professor of the Natural Sciences in the Department of Astronomy at Harvard University. Full member of the National Academy of Sciences, Ramesh Narayan is widely known for his contributions on the theory of black hole accretion processes. He is involved in the Event Horizon Telescope project, which led in 2019 to the first image of the event horizon of a black hole.

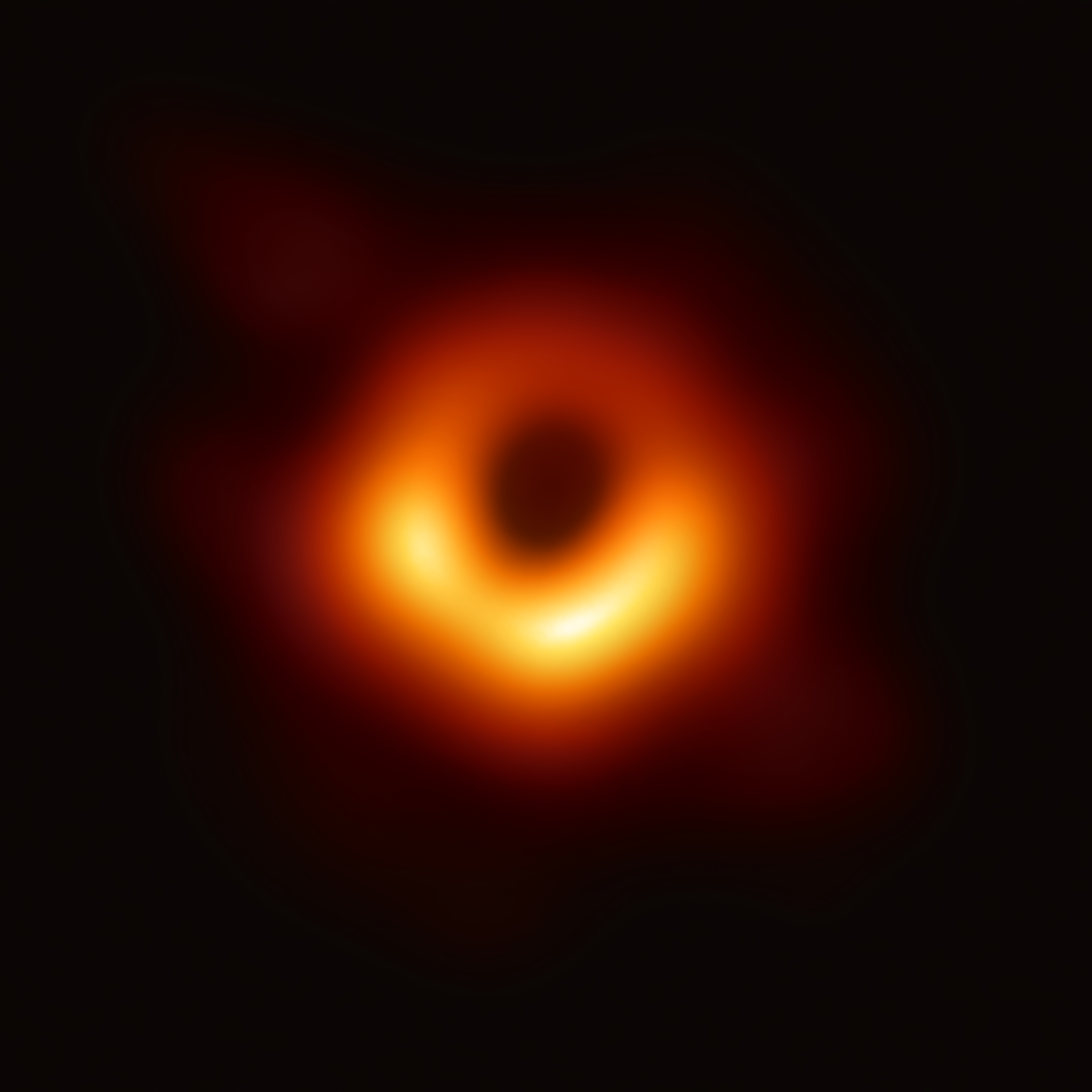
The first image of the event horizon of a black hole, captured by the Event Horizon Telescope collaboration.

== Education and career path ==
Ramesh Narayan received a B.Sc. in physics from Madras University and a Ph.D. from Bangalore University in 1979. After his studies, he spent several years as a postdoctoral researcher at the Raman Research Institute in Bangalore. Later on, he moved to the California Institute of Technology (Caltech) in 1983, where he eventually became a senior research fellow. After six years as a faculty member at the University of Arizona, he moved to Harvard University in 1991, where he is currently the Thomas Dudley Cabot Professor of Natural Sciences at the Astronomy Department, which he chaired between 1997 and 2001. He served on the Physical Sciences jury for the Infosys Prize from 2011 to 2014.

== Fellowships ==
Ramesh Narayan is currently a member of the United States National Academy of Sciences, a fellow of the Royal Society of London, a fellow of the American Association for the Advancement of Science and a fellow of the World Academy of Sciences.

== Scientific contributions ==
Ramesh Narayan is widely known for his broad contributions to theoretical astrophysics, specifically to high-energy astrophysics. He wrote landmark studies on gamma-ray bursts, accretion disks, black holes, gravitational lensing and neutron stars. He is well known for his works on numerical simulations on accretion flows around supermassive black holes and the possibility of forming jets, via the Blandford–Znajek process. He significantly improved GRRMHD codes to perform numerical simulations, which handle General Relativistic (GR), Radiative (R), and MagnetoHydroDynamic (MHD) physics.
