= Far infrared =

Light with 15-1000 μm wavelength

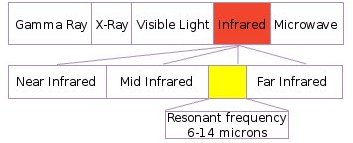
Diagram of part of the electromagnetic spectrum

Far infrared (FIR) or long wave refers to a specific range within the infrared spectrum of electromagnetic radiation. It encompasses radiation with wavelengths ranging from 15 μm (micrometers) to 30 μm which corresponds to a frequency range of approximately 20 THz to 10 THz. This places far infrared radiation within the CIE IR-B and IR-C bands. The longer wavelengths of the FIR spectrum overlap with a range known as terahertz radiation. Different sources may use different boundaries to define the far infrared range. For instance, astronomers often define it as wavelengths between 25 μm and 350 μm. Infrared photons possess significantly lower energy than photons in the visible light spectrum, with tens to hundreds of times less energy.

== Applications ==
=== Astronomy ===
Objects within a temperature range of approximately 170 K to 340 K emit radiation in the far infrared range as a result of black-body radiation, in accordance with Wien's displacement law. This characteristic is utilized in the observation of interstellar gases, which are frequently associated with the formation of new stars.

The brightness observed in far infrared images of the center of the Milky Way galaxy arises from the high density of stars in that region, which heats the surrounding dust and induces radiation emission in the far infrared spectrum. Excluding the center of the Milky Way galaxy, the galaxy M82 is the most prominent far-infrared object in the sky, with its central region emitting amounts of far infrared light equivalent to the combined emissions of all the stars in the Milky Way. As of 29 May 2012, the source responsible for heating the dust at the center of M82 remains unknown.

=== Human body detection ===
Certain human proximity sensors utilize passive infrared sensing within the far infrared wavelength range to detect the presence of stationary and moving human bodies.

=== Heating ===
Infrared heating (IR) is a method of heating an area through more efficient results than gas or electric convection heating. Studies show IR heats faster, more uniformly, and more efficiently than a traditional system. Increasingly, IR heating is utilised as part of scheme designs to achieve spot, zonal and smart heating within occupation zones within a building. Though multiple applications of long wave or FIR heating exist, a common representation comprises radiant panel heaters. Radiant panel heaters typically contain a grid of resistance wire or ribbons which are sandwiched between a thin plate of electrical insulation on an emitting die and thermal insulation on the back side. Owing to their size and flexibility, infrared panel heaters can be fitted on walls and ceilings for added-space saving benefits. Electric FIR panel heaters are shown to have up to 98.5% efficiency from supply to production of heat with satisfactory thermal comfort, thermostatic control, and with low initial investment.

=== Therapeutic modality ===
Researchers have observed that among all forms of radiant heat, only far-infrared radiation transfers energy solely in the form of heat that can be sensed by the human body. They have found that this type of radiant heat can penetrate the skin up to a depth of approximately 1.5 inches (3.8 cm). In the field of biomedicine, experiments have been conducted using fabrics woven with FIR-emitting ceramics embedded in their fibers. These studies have indicated a potential delay in the onset of fatigue induced by muscle contractions in participants. The researchers have suggested that the emission of far-infrared radiation by these ceramics (referred to as cFIR) could facilitate cellular repair.

Certain heating pads have been marketed to provide "far infrared" therapy, which is claimed to offer deeper penetration. However, the infrared radiation emitted by an object is determined by its temperature, following the Black-body radiation law. Therefore, all heating pads emit the same type of infrared radiation if they are at the same temperature. Higher temperatures will result in greater infrared radiation, but caution must be exercised to avoid burns.
