= Habitable Exoplanets Observatory =

Proposed space observatory to characterize exoplanets' atmospheres

Habitable Exoplanet Observatory (HabEx)
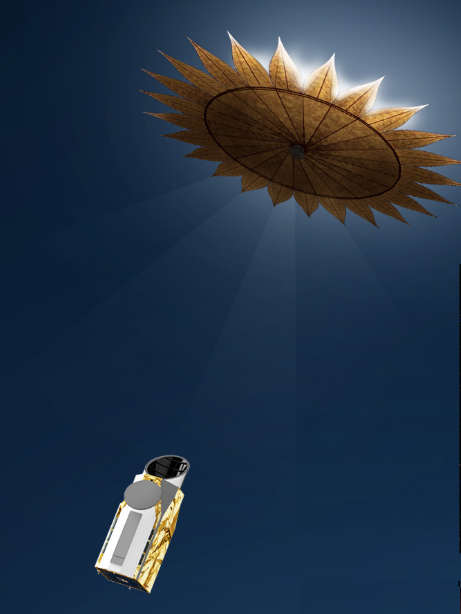
- The HabEx Space Observatory along with its starshade
- Mission type: Space observatory
- Operator: NASA
- Website: www.jpl.nasa.gov/habex/
- Mission duration: 5 to 10 years (proposed)

Spacecraft properties
- Launch mass: 18,550 kilograms (40,900 lb) (maximum)
- Dry mass: ≈10,160 kg (22,400 lb)
- Payload mass: ≈6,080 kg (13,400 lb) (telescope + instruments)
- Power: 6.9 kW (maximum)

Start of mission
- Launch date: 2035 (proposed)
- Rocket: Observatory: Space Launch System (SLS) Block 1B; Starshade: Falcon Heavy

Orbital parameters
- Regime: Lagrange point (Sun-Earth L2)

Main telescope
- Diameter: 4 m (13 ft)
- Wavelengths: Visible; possibly UV, NIR, IR (91 – 1000 nm)
- Resolution: R ≥ 60,000; SNR ≥ 5 per resolution element on targets of AB ≥ 20 mag (GALEX FUV) in exposure times of ≤12 h

Instruments
- VIS camera, UV spectrograph, coronagraph, starshade

The Habitable Exoplanet Observatory (HabEx) is a space telescope concept that would be optimized to search for and image Earth-size habitable exoplanets in the habitable zones of their stars, where liquid water can exist. HabEx would aim to understand how common terrestrial worlds beyond the Solar System may be and determine the range of their characteristics. It would be an optical, UV and infrared telescope that would also use spectrographs to study planetary atmospheres and eclipse starlight with either an internal coronagraph or an external starshade.

The proposal, first made in 2016, is for a large strategic science missions NASA mission. It would operate at the Lagrange point L2.

In January 2023, a new space telescope concept was proposed called the Habitable Worlds Observatory (HWO), which draws upon HabEx and the Large Ultraviolet Optical Infrared Surveyor (LUVOIR).

== Overview ==
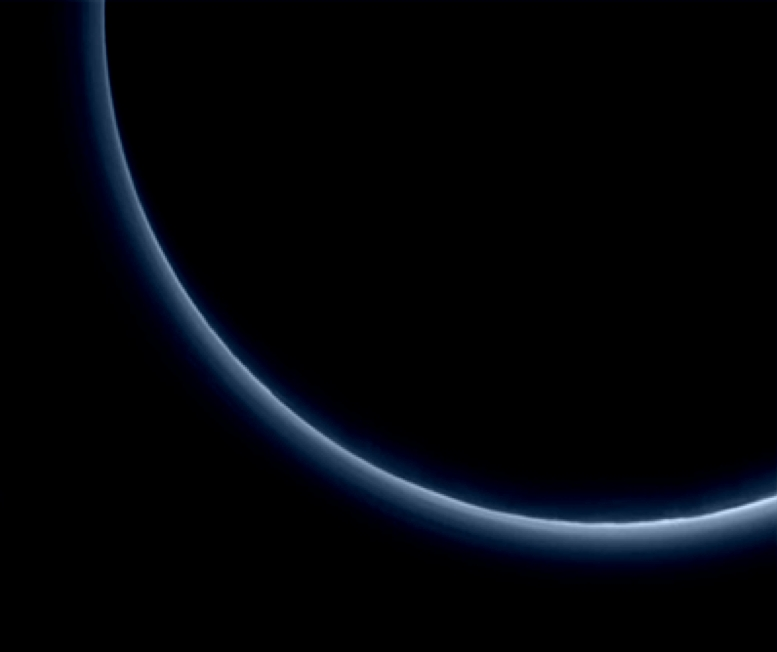
Pluto's atmosphere backlit by the Sun.

In 2016, NASA began considering four different space telescopes as the next Flagship (Large strategic science missions) following the James Webb Space Telescope and Nancy Grace Roman Space Telescope. They are the Habitable Exoplanet Observatory (HabEx), Large Ultraviolet Optical Infrared Surveyor (LUVOIR), Origins Space Telescope, and Lynx X-ray Surveyor. In 2019, the four teams turned their final reports over to the National Academy of Sciences, whose independent Decadal Survey committee advises NASA on which mission should take top priority.

The Habitable Exoplanet Imaging Mission (HabEx) is a concept for a mission to directly image planetary systems around Sun-like stars. HabEx will be sensitive to all types of planets; however its main goal is to directly image Earth-size rocky exoplanets, and characterize their atmospheric content. By measuring the spectra of these planets, HabEx will search for signatures of habitability such as water, and be sensitive to gases in the atmosphere potentially indicative of biological activity, such as oxygen or ozone.

In 2021, the National Academy of Sciences released its final recommendations in the Decadal Survey. It recommended that NASA consider a new 6-meter (20-foot) aperture telescope combining design elements of LUVOIR and HabEx. The new telescope would be called the Habitable Worlds Observatory (HWO). A preliminary launch date was set for 2040, and the budget was estimated to be $11 billion.

== Science drivers and goals ==
HabEx's prime science goal is the discovery and characterization of Earth-sized planets in the habitable zones of nearby main sequence stars, it will also study the full range of exoplanets within the systems and also enable a wide range of general astrophysics science.

In particular, the mission will be designed to search for signs of habitability and biosignatures in the atmospheres of Earth-sized rocky planets located in the habitable zone of nearby solar type stars. Absorption features from CH_{4}, H_{2}O, NH_{3}, and CO, and emission features from Na and K, are all within the wavelength range of anticipated HabEx observations.

With a contrast that is 1000 times better than that achievable with the Hubble Space Telescope, HabEx could resolve large dust structures, tracing the gravitational effect of planets. By imaging several faint protoplanetary disks for the first time, HabEx will enable comparative studies of dust inventory and properties across a broad range of stellar classifications. This will put the Solar System in perspective not only in terms of exoplanet populations, but also in terms of dust belt morphologies.

=== General astronomy ===
General astrometry and astrophysics observations may be performed if justified by a high science return while still being compatible with top exoplanet science goals and preferred architecture. A wide variety of investigations are currently being considered for HabEx general astrophysics program. They range from studies of galaxy leakiness and inter-galactic medium reionization through measurements of the escape fraction of ionizing photons, to studies of the life cycle of baryons as they flow in and out of galaxies, to resolved stellar population studies, including the impact of massive stars and other local environment conditions on star formation rate and history. More exotic applications include astrometric observations of local dwarf galaxies to help constrain the nature of dark matter, and precision measurement of the local value of the Hubble Constant.

The following table summarizes the possible investigations currently suggested for HabEx general astrophysics:

Science driver	Observation	Wavelength
Local Hubble Constant	Image Cepheid in type Ia supernova host galaxies	Optical-NIS
Galaxy leakiness and reionization	UV imaging of galaxies (LyC photons escape fraction)	UV, preferably down to LyC at 91 nm
Cosmic baryon cycle	UV imaging and spectroscopy of absorption lines in background quasars	Imaging: down to 115 nm Spectroscopy: down to 91 nm
Massive stars/feedback	UV imaging and spectroscopy in the Milky Way and nearby galaxies	Imaging: 110–1000 nm Spectroscopy: 120–160 nm
Stellar archaeology	Resolved photometry of individual stars in nearby galaxies	Optical: 500–1000 nm
Dark matter	Photometry and astrometric proper motion of stars in local group dwarf galaxies	Optical: 500–1000 nm

== Preliminary desired specifications ==
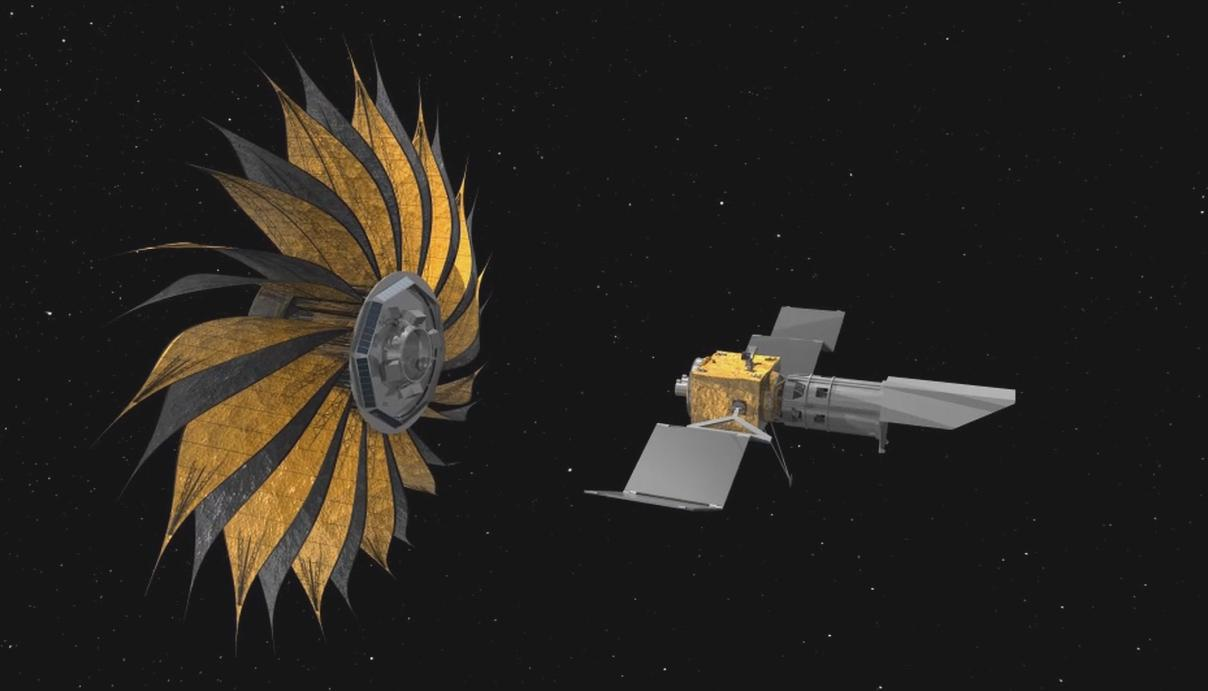
Proposed architecture: starshade with space observatory

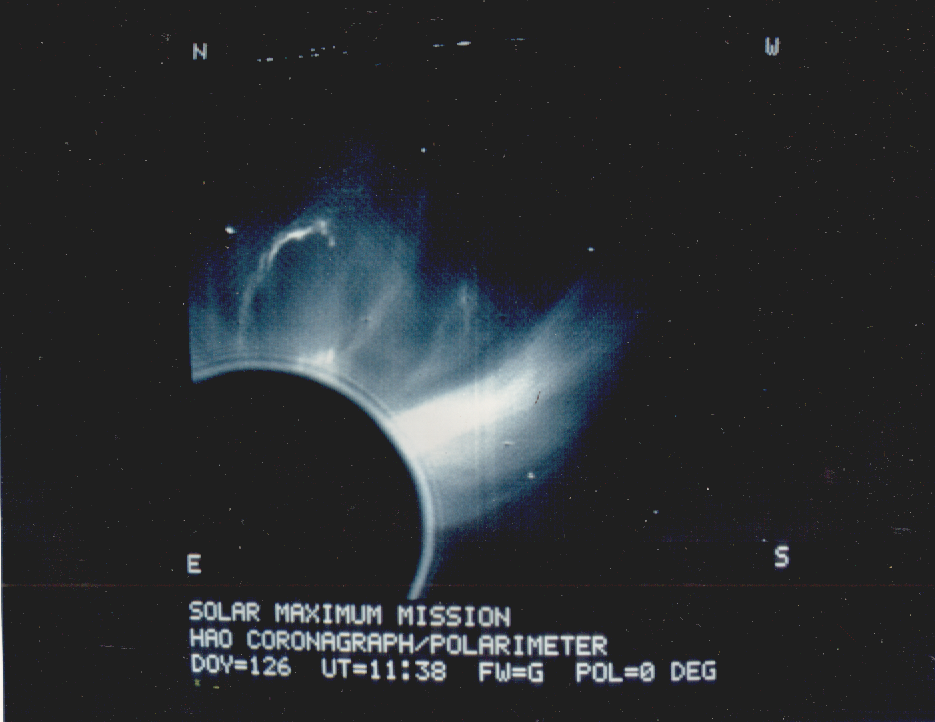
Coronagraph image of the Sun

Based on the science drivers and purpose, the researchers are considering direct imaging and spectroscopy of reflected starlight in the visible spectrum, with potential extensions to the UV and the near infrared parts of the spectrum. The telescope has a primary monolithic mirror that is 4 metres (13 ft) in diameter.

An absolute minimum continuous wavelength range is 0.4 to 1 μm, with possible short wavelength extensions down below 0.3 μm and near infrared extensions to 1.7 μm or even 2.5 μm, depending on the cost and complexity.

For characterization of extraterrestrial atmospheres, going to longer wavelengths would require a 52 m (171 ft) starshade that would launch separately on a Falcon Heavy, or a larger telescope in order to reduce the amount of background light. An alternative would be to keep the coronagraph small. Characterizing exoplanets at wavelengths shorter than ~350 nm would require a fully UV-sensitive high contrast optical train to preserve throughput, and will make all wavefront requirements more stringent, whether for a starshade or a coronagraph architecture. Such high spatial resolution, high contrast observations would also open up unique capabilities for studying the formation and evolution of stars and galaxies.

=== Biosignatures ===
HabEx would search for potential biosignature gases in exoplanets' atmospheres, such as O_{2} (0.69 and 0.76 μm) and its photolytic product ozone (O_{3}). On the long wavelength side, extending the observations to 1.7 μm would make it possible to search for strong additional water signatures (at 1.13 and 1.41 μm), and would also allow to search for evidence that the detected O_{2} and O_{3} gases were created by abiotic processes (e.g., by looking for features from CO_{2}, CO, O_{4}). A further infrared capability to ~2.5 μm would allow to search for secondary features such as methane (CH_{4}) that may be consistent with biological processes. Pushing even further in the UV may also allow distinction between a biotic, high-O_{2} atmosphere from an abiotic, CO_{2}-rich atmosphere based on the ozone absorption of 0.3 μm.

Molecular oxygen (O_{2}) can be produced by geophysical processes, as well as a byproduct of photosynthesis by life forms, so although encouraging, O_{2} is not a definite biosignature, unless it is considered in its environmental context. I.e., while O2 production to ~20% of atmospheric content seems to be part of life on Earth, too much oxygen is actually poisonous to life as humans know it and could easily be created by planetary situations like an incredibly deep world spanning ocean.
