= NASA large strategic science missions =

Series of NASA missions to explore the Universe

The encapsulated fairing of Nancy Grace Roman Space Telescope as it is seen being transferred from NASA's processing facility to its launchpad. As NASA's latest space telescope, Roman costs more than US$4 billion.

NASA's large strategic science missions or large strategic missions, formerly known as Flagship missions or Flagship-class missions, are the costliest and most capable NASA science spacecraft. Flagship missions exist within all four divisions of NASA's Science Mission Directorate (SMD): the astrophysics, Earth science, heliophysics and planetary science divisions.

"Large" refers to the budget of each mission, typically the most expensive mission in the scientific discipline. Within the Astrophysics Division and the Planetary Science Division, the large strategic missions are usually in excess of US$1 billion. Within Earth Science Division and Heliophysics Division, the large strategic missions are usually in excess of US$500 million. "Strategic" refers to their role advancing multiple strategic priorities set forth in plans such as the decadal surveys. "Science" marks these missions as primarily scientific in nature, under the Science Mission Directorate (SMD), as opposed to, e.g., human exploration missions under the Human Exploration and Operations Mission Directorate (HEOMD). The lines can be blurred, as when the Lunar Reconnaissance Orbiter began as a directed mission from the HEOMD, and was later transferred to the SMD.

Flagship missions are not under the purview of any larger "Flagship Program", unlike, e.g., Discovery-class missions that are under the purview of the Discovery Program. Unlike these competed classes that tender proposals through a competitive selection process, the development of Flagship missions is directed to a specific institution — usually a NASA center or the Jet Propulsion Laboratory — by the SMD. Flagship missions are developed ad-hoc, with no predetermined launch cadence or uniform budget size. Flagship missions are always Class A missions: high priority, very low risk.

== Missions ==
NASA Large Strategic Science Missions
| Mission name | Start date | End date |
Planetary Science Division
| Viking 1, 2 | 1975 | 1982 |
| Voyager 1, 2 | 1977 | Operational |
| Galileo | 1989 | 2003 |
| Comet Rendezvous Asteroid Flyby | 1996 | Cancelled |
| Cassini | 1997 | 2017 |
| Mars Science Laboratory (Curiosity rover) | 2011 | Operational |
| Mars 2020 (Perseverance rover and Ingenuity helicopter) | 2020 | Operational |
| Europa Clipper | 2024 | Operational |
| NASA–ESA Mars Sample Return Mission | 2028–30 | Cancelled |
| Uranus Orbiter and Probe | 2032 | Proposed |
| Enceladus Orbilander | 2038 | Proposed |
Astrophysics Division
| Hubble Space Telescope | 1990 | Operational |
| Compton Gamma Ray Observatory | 1991 | 2000 |
| Chandra X-ray Observatory | 1999 | Operational |
| James Webb Space Telescope | 2021 | Operational |
| Nancy Grace Roman Space Telescope | 2026 | En route |
| Habitable Worlds Observatory | 2040 | Proposed |
Heliophysics Division
| Solar Dynamics Observatory | 2010 | Operational |
| Van Allen Probes | 2012 | 2019 |
| Magnetospheric Multiscale Mission (MMS) | 2015 | Operational |
| Parker Solar Probe | 2018 | Operational |
Earth Science Division
| Terra | 1999 | Operational |
| Aqua | 2002 | Operational |
| ICESat | 2003 | 2010 |
| Aura | 2004 | Operational |
| Joint Polar Satellite System (JPSS) ─ a constellation | 2011 | Operational |
| Plankton, Aerosol, Cloud, ocean Ecosystem (PACE) | 2024 | Operational |
| NISAR | 2025 | Operational |

Of the four Great Observatories, only the Spitzer Space Telescope is not a Flagship mission. Initially budgeted at US$2 billion, Spitzer was downscoped to a medium-size mission of US$720 million.

== See also ==
- Discovery Program – Solar system exploration program by NASA
- New Frontiers program – Series of space exploration missions being conducted by NASA
