= List of exoplanet search projects =

The following is a list of exoplanet search projects.

== Ground-based search projects ==
Project name	Status	Number of exoplanets found	Notes
Anglo-Australian Planet Search (AAPS)	Active	28 (as of February 2014)	
Automated Planet Finder (APF)	Active	0	based at the Lick Observatory (also known as the Rocky Planet Finder)
Carl Sagan Institute	Active	0	
CARMENES	Active	60+	based at Calar Alto Observatory
CORALIE spectrograph	Active	5	based at Leonhard Euler Telescope
East-Asian Planet Search Network (EAPSNET)	Active	1	
ELODIE	Decommissioned	4	
EPICS	Future (2030?)	N/A	based at the E-ELT
ESPRESSO	Active	N/A	based at the VLT
EXPRES	Active	N/A	based at the Lowell Discovery Telescope
FINDS Exo-Earths	Active	0	based at the 3m telescope at Lick Observatory
Gemini Planet Imager (GPI)	Active	1	
Geneva Extrasolar Planet Search	Active	1+	
High Accuracy Radial Velocity Planet Searcher (HARPS)	Active	130+	
HARPS-N	Active	18+	
HATNet and HATSouth Projects (HAT)	Active	109	
Hunt for Exomoons with Kepler (HEK)	Active	0 (A few candidates, including Kepler-1625 b I)	
HiCIAO	Active	0	
High Resolution Echelle Spectrometer (HIRES)	Active	7+	based at the W. M. Keck Observatory
KELT	Decommissioned	26	
Lick–Carnegie Exoplanet Survey (LCES)	Active	1+	
Magellan Planet Search Program	Active	10+	
MARVELS	Active	1+	
MASCARA	Active	5	
MEarth Project	Active	3	
Microlensing Follow-Up Network (MicroFUN)	Merged with PLANET	10	
Microlensing Observations in Astrophysics (MOA)	Active	8	Mt. John University Observatory
MINiature Exoplanet Radial Velocity Array (MINERVA)	Active	0	
N2K Consortium	Active	7	
New Mexico Exoplanet Spectroscopic Survey Instrument (NESSI)	Active	0	
Next-Generation Transit Survey (NGTS)	Active	20	at Paranal, since 2015
Okayama Planet Search Program (OPSP)	Active	6	
Optical Gravitational Lensing Experiment (OGLE)	Active	17+	
PlanetPol	Decommissioned	0	
PRL Advanced Radial-velocity All-sky Search (PARAS)	Active	3	Spectrograph integrated with the 1.2m Gurushikhar Observatory in Mount Abu, India.
Project 1640	Active	0+	
Qatar Exoplanet Survey (QES)	Active	9	
Search for extraterrestrial intelligence (SETI)	Active	0	
SOPHIE échelle spectrograph	Active	0+	
Spectro-Polarimetric High-Contrast Exoplanet Research (SPHERE)	Active	1+	
SPECULOOS	Commissioning	-	Searching 1,200 nearby "Ultra Cool Dwarfs" (M7 and later). Successor to TRAPPIST.
Strategic Explorations of Exoplanets and Disks with Subaru (SEEDS)	Active	1+	
SuperWASP (WASP)	Active	191	
Systemic	Active	0	an amateur search project
The Habitable Exoplanet Hunting Project	Active	1 (candidate)	International network of more than 30 observatories including universities and amateur astronomers.
Trans-Atlantic Exoplanet Survey (TrES)	Decommissioned	5	
Transiting Planets and Planetesimals Small Telescope (TRAPPIST)	Active	7	Searching 50 nearby "Ultra Cool Dwarfs" (M7 and later). Prototype for SPECULOOS.
XO Telescope (XO)	Active	7	
ZIMPOL/CHEOPS	Active	0	subsystem of the VLT-SPHERE instrument, based at the VLT
COCONUTS	Active	3	Large-scale survey for wide-orbit planetary and substellar companions

== Space missions ==
=== Past and current ===
Name	Launch date	End date	Number of exoplanets found	Current candidates	Telescope use
MOST	June 20, 2003	March 2019	1+	0	First spacecraft dedicated to the study of asteroseismology
EPOXI	July 21, 2005	August 8, 2013	0	0	Characterized planets and fly-by of comet
SWEEPS	2006	2006	16	0	Based from the HST, a short 7 day mission looking for exoplanets
CoRoT	December 27, 2006	November 2, 2012	34	600	Mission to look for exoplanets using the transit method
Kepler	March 7, 2009	August 15, 2013	3,246	4,711	Mission to look for large numbers of exoplanets using the transit method
K2	November 18, 2013	October 30, 2018	427	891 (+627 microlensing events)	After the reaction wheels failed on Kepler, this mission was created
Gaia	December 19, 2013	March 27, 2025	4	72+	Map 1 billion astronomical objects in the Milky Way (First data Release November 2, 2016)
ASTERIA	November 2017	December 5, 2019	0	0	CubeSat, technology demonstrator
TESS	April 18, 2018	Ongoing	735+	7,890	To search for new exoplanets; rotating so by the end of its two-year mission it will have observed stars from all over the sky. It is expected to find at least 3,000 new exoplanets.
CHEOPS	2019	Ongoing	2+	0	To learn more about how exoplanets form, probe atmospheres, and characterize super-Earths. 20% of time will be open to community use. Duration: 3.5 (+ 3 goal) years
JWST	Commissioned on 25, December 2021	Ongoing	1	0	To study atmospheres of known exoplanets and find some Jupiter-sized exoplanets Duration: 10 (+ 10 goal) years
			3,263 (8,000 Total)	8,000+	

=== Planned ===
Name	Launch date	Mission objectives	Duration	Notes
ARIEL	2029 (Ariane 62)	Observe exoplanets using the transit method, study and characterise the planets' chemical composition and thermal structures	4 years	
RST	August 30, 2026	To search for and study exoplanets while studying dark matter. It is expected to find about 2,500 planets.	6 years	
PLATO	March 2027 (Ariane 62)	To search for and characterize rocky planets around stars like our own.	4 (+4 goal) years	
TOLIMAN	2027	Detect exoplanets in Alpha Centauri using astrometry.	3 years	
LIFE	2040	Detect and characterize the atmospheres of dozens of warm, terrestrial extrasolar planets.	5-6 years	

=== Proposed ===
- EXCEDE
- FINESSE
- Origins
- HabEx
- LUVOIR
- New Worlds Mission
- PEGASE

=== Canceled ===
- Darwin
- EChO
- Eddington
- Space Interferometry Mission
- Terrestrial Planet Finder
