= HD 131399 Ab =

Red dwarf star in the constellation Centaurus

- HD 131399 Ab photographed alongside the HD 131399 star system Credit: ESO/K. Wagner et al.

Observation data Epoch J2000 Equinox ICRS
- Constellation: Centaurus
- Right ascension: 14^{h} 54^{m} 25.3^{s}
- Declination: −34° 08′ 34″

Characteristics
- Evolutionary stage: main sequence
- Spectral type: K–M

Astrometry
Proper motion (μ)	RA: −4.7±1.6 mas/yr Dec.: −11.2±1.3 mas/yr
Parallax (π)	≲1 mas
Distance	≳1,000 pc

Other designations
- WGK 1Aa, WDS J14544-3409Ab, Scorpion-1b

Database references
SIMBAD	data

HD 131399 Ab (nicknamed Scorpion-1b) is a K-type or M-type main-sequence star located in the constellation of Centaurus which was mistaken for an exoplanet orbiting the quadruple-star system HD 131399.

== Characteristics ==
The planet was thought to be about 16 million years old, with a mass of 4 (± 1) M_{J} (Jupiter masses), and a temperature of 850 K (577 °C; 1,070 °F) (± 50 K), which would make it one of the coldest and least massive directly imaged exoplanets. Its atmosphere was shown to contain both water and methane through the use of near-infrared spectroscopy (1.4–1.6 μm). Scientists believed it was unlikely that the planet harbored life due to it being gaseous. The planet was said to have "no liquid water, extremely powerful winds, and no surface; just below the uppermost layer of the atmosphere it rains liquid iron droplets."

The central star HD 131399A is orbited by the less massive stars (HD 131399B and HD 131399C) at about 300 astronomical units (AU). HD 131399B and HD 131399C orbit each other at about 10 AU, while HD 131399 Ab was thought to orbit HD 131399A at about 80 AU.

One orbit of HD 131399 Ab was thought to take 550 years. During about a quarter of the orbit, 100 to 140 years, all three suns would have been visible during a single day: during this period, any spot on the planet would be in perpetual sunlight—as the single sun sets, the binary pair rises.

== Discovery ==
HD 131399 Ab was discovered using the SPHERE imager of the Very Large Telescope at the European Southern Observatory, located in the Atacama Desert of Chile, and announced in a July 2016 paper in the journal Science. This would hae been the first exoplanet to be discovered by SPHERE and one of very few directly imaged exoplanets. The image was created from two separate SPHERE observations: one to image the three stars and one to detect the faint planet. After its discovery, the team unofficially named the system "Scorpion-1" and the planet "Scorpion-1b", after the survey that prompted its discovery, the Scorpion Planet Survey (principal investigator: Daniel Apai).

In May 2017, observations collected with the Gemini Planet Imager, and including a reanalysis of the SPHERE data, suggested that this target is in fact a background star. Further observations in 2022 confirmed this.

== Gallery ==
This artist's impression shows the orbit of the planet in the triple-star system.

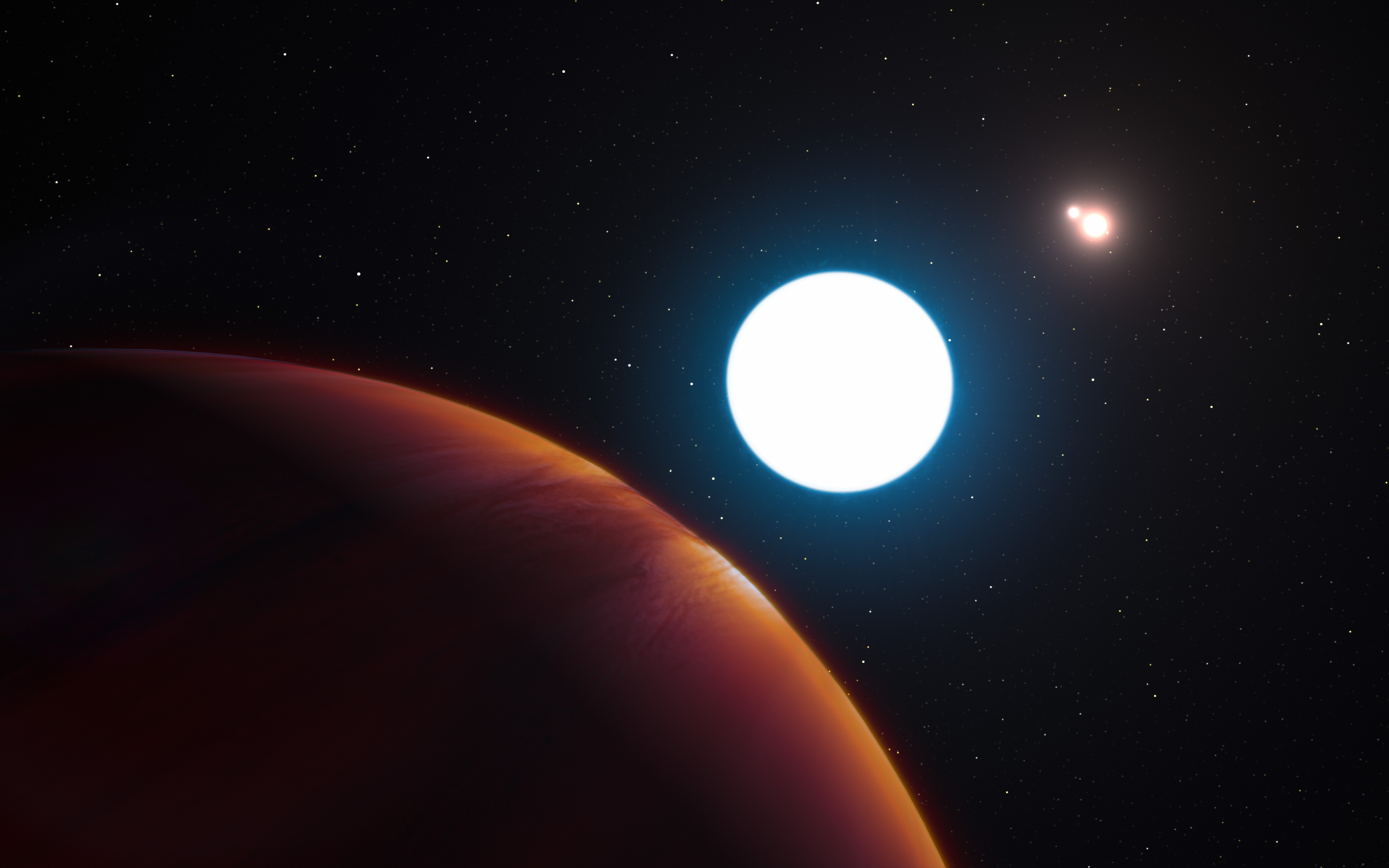
Artist's impression of the system as seen from the supposed planet. HD 131399 A is at the center. The other two stars can be seen in the distance.

== See also ==
- HD 188753 Ab
- YSES 2b, a red dwarf similarly mistaken to be a gaseous exoplanet
