= V471 Tauri =

Variable star in the constellation Taurus

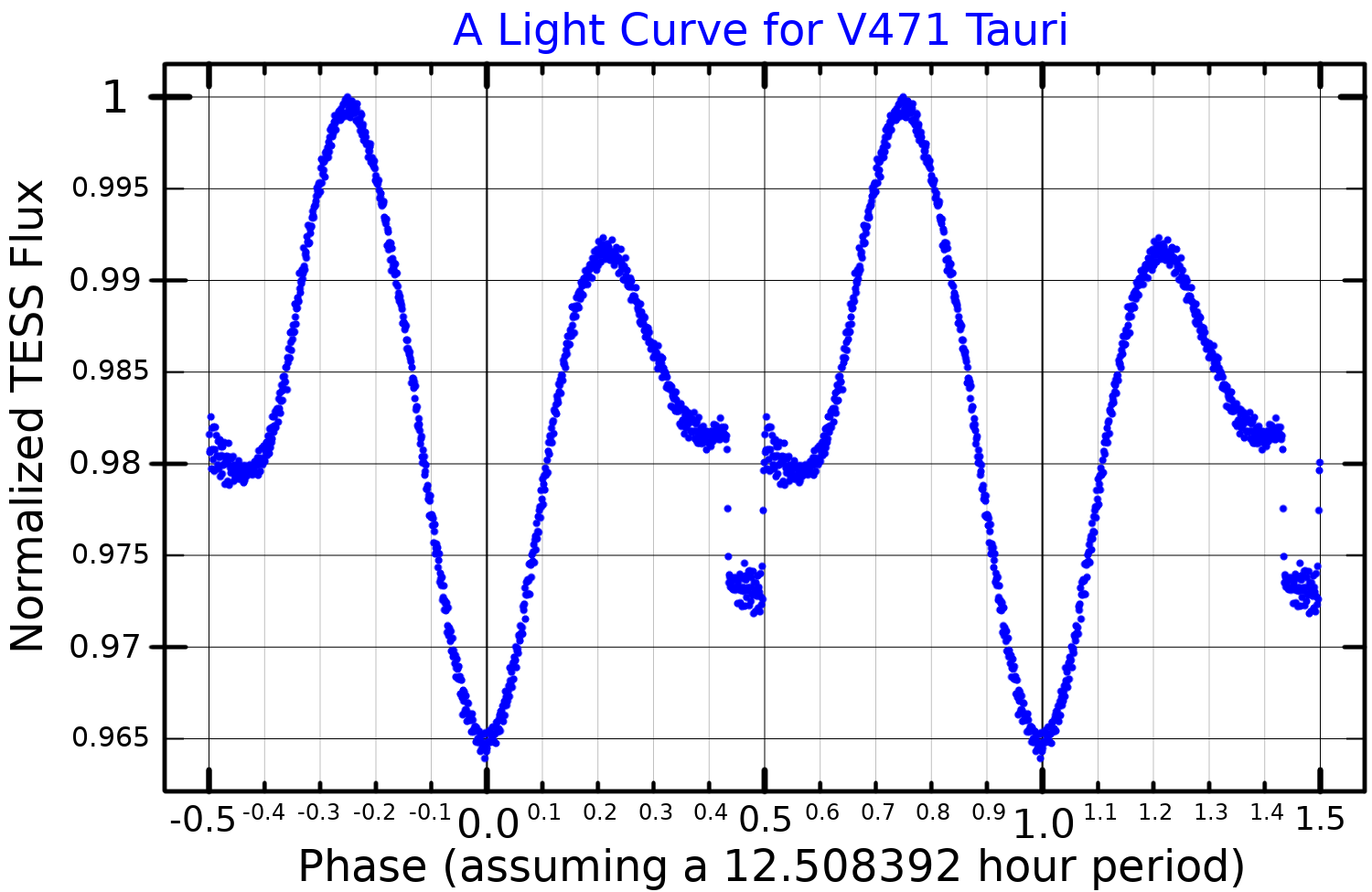
- A light curve for V471 Tauri, plotted from TESS data

Observation data Epoch J2000 Equinox J2000
- Constellation: Taurus
- Right ascension: 03^{h} 50^{m} 24.9667^{s}
- Declination: 17° 14′ 47.431″
- Apparent magnitude (V): 9.40 - 9.71

Characteristics
- Evolutionary stage: main sequence + white dwarf
- Spectral type: K2V + D2
- Variable type: Algol + RS CVn

Astrometry
Radial velocity (R_{v})	37.4±0.5 km/s
Proper motion (μ)	RA: 127.278 mas/yr Dec.: −22.321 mas/yr
Parallax (π)	21.0129±0.0158 mas
Distance	155.2 ± 0.1 ly (47.59 ± 0.04 pc)

Orbit
Period (P)	0.52118 days
Semi-major axis (a)	0.01496 AU
Eccentricity (e)	0 (assumed)
Inclination (i)	80.8°

Details

White dwarf
Mass	0.792 M_{☉}
Radius	0.01134 R_{☉}
Luminosity	0.145 L_{☉}
Surface gravity (log g)	8.227 cgs
Temperature	34,500 K

K star
Mass	0.852 M_{☉}
Radius	0.816 R_{☉}
Luminosity	0.41 L_{☉}
Surface gravity (log g)	4.49 cgs
Temperature	5,066 K
Metallicity [Fe/H]	+0.12 dex
Rotation	0.5211 days
Rotational velocity (v sin i)	89.30 km/s
Age	625 Myr

Other designations
- 471 Tau, BD+16°516, HIP 17962

Database references
SIMBAD	data

V471 Tauri (short V471 Tau) is an eclipsing variable star in the constellation of Taurus. The star has a visual magnitude of 9 which makes it impossible to see with the naked eye. It is around 155 light-years away from the Solar System, in the Hyades star cluster.

In 1970, Burt Nelson and Arthur Young announced that the star is a variable star. It was given its variable star designation in 1972.

== Physical properties ==
The V471 Tauri system has at least two members: a white dwarf star of spectral type D2; and a K-type main sequence star (K2 V), together a post-common envelope binary. There are variations in the timing of the eclipses that were once thought to be due to a third member of the system, proposed to be a brown dwarf, but a direct imaging search for this object with SPHERE resulted in a non-detection. The eclipse variations may be caused by the Applegate mechanism, or the third body may be a pair of smaller brown dwarfs, which would be too faint to have been detected. Later studies have found that the timing variations cannot be explained solely by additional components of the system; even if one or more brown dwarfs are present, the Applegate mechanism must also be a factor.
