= XZ Andromedae =

Binary star in the constellation Andromeda

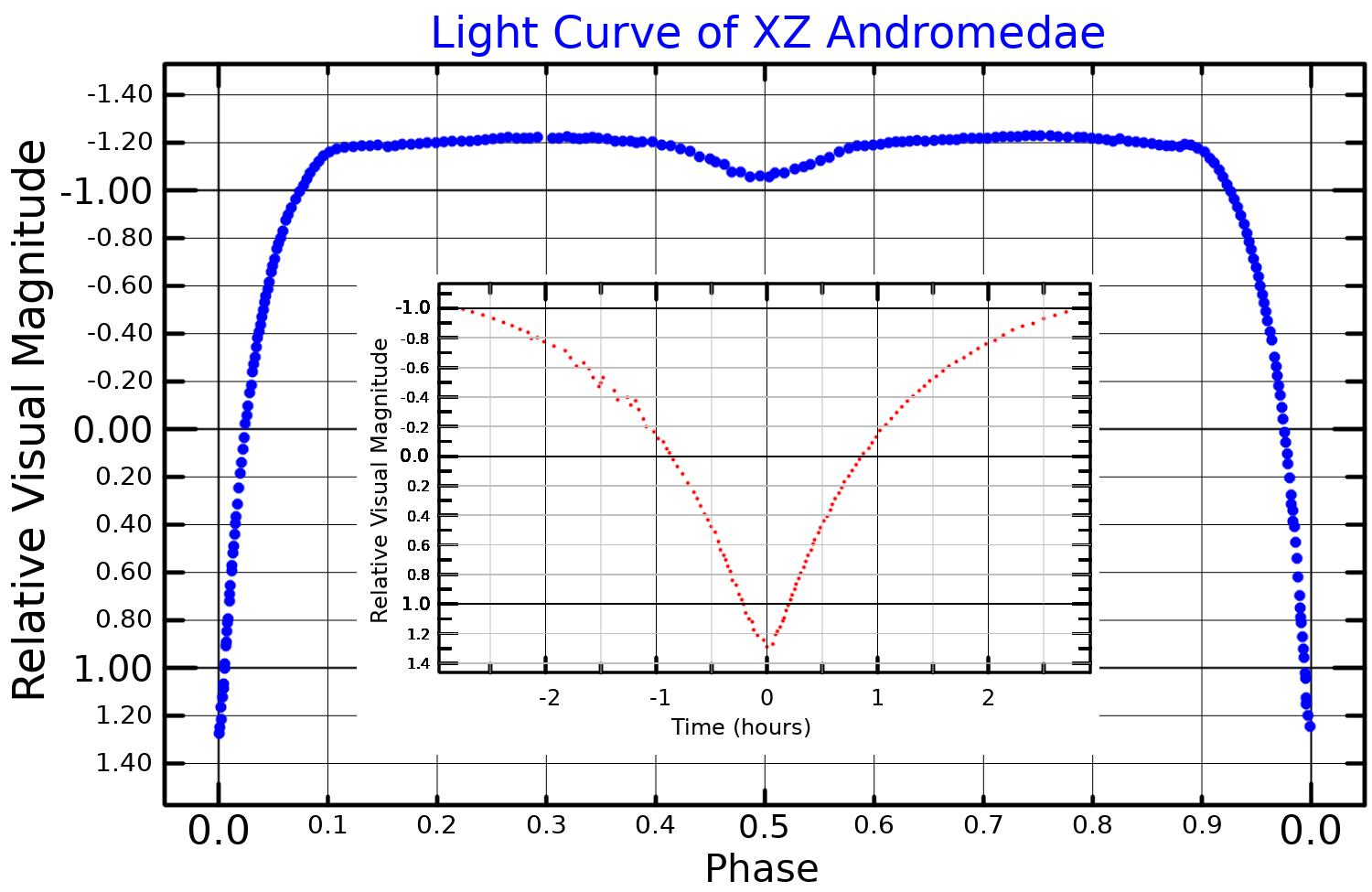
- The visual band light curve of XZ Andromedae is shown. The main plot shows the light curve over a full cycle, and the inset plot shows the primary minimum on an expanded scale. Adapted from Yang (2013)

Observation data Epoch J2000 Equinox J2000
- Constellation: Andromeda
- Right ascension: 01^{h} 56^{m} 51.52412^{s}
- Declination: +42° 06′ 02.1814″
- Apparent magnitude (V): 9.91 – 12.45 variable

Characteristics
- Evolutionary stage: main sequence + subgiant
- Spectral type: A4IV-V + G5IV
- Apparent magnitude (B): 10.16
- Apparent magnitude (V): 9.93
- Apparent magnitude (G): 9.955
- Apparent magnitude (J): 9.373
- Apparent magnitude (H): 9.210
- Apparent magnitude (K): 9.188
- B−V color index: 0.2125
- Variable type: EA

Astrometry
Proper motion (μ)	RA: 4.445±0.033 mas/yr Dec.: −11.827±0.053 mas/yr
Parallax (π)	1.9328±0.0590 mas
Distance	1,690 ± 50 ly (520 ± 20 pc)

Orbit
Period (P)	1.357 days
Eccentricity (e)	0
Inclination (i)	89°
Periastron epoch (T)	HJD 2449313.53084±0.00081

Details

Primary
Mass	3.2 M_{☉}
Radius	2.4 R_{☉}
Temperature	9,500 K

Secondary
Mass	1.3 M_{☉}
Radius	2.6 R_{☉}
Temperature	5,500 K

Other designations
- 2MASS J01565151+4206021, BD+41 376, TYC 2824-1360-1

Database references
SIMBAD	data

XZ Andromedae (also known as XZ And) is a binary star in the constellation Andromeda. Its maximum apparent visual magnitude is 9.91, but drops down to 12.45 every 1.357 days. Its variability matches the behaviour of Algol variable stars.

== System ==
The primary star of the system has a mass of 3.2 M_{☉} and has a spectral type A4IV-V, meaning that it has intermediate characteristics between a main sequence star and a subgiant one. The secondary is less massive (1.3 M_{☉}) but larger than the primary, so it's an evolved subgiant star and its spectral type is G5IV. The secondary component will likely evolve into a white dwarf before the primary leaves the main sequence. Since 2019, it is suspected that the eclipsing binary is orbited by an additional two similar stars in a 1:3 mean-motion resonance with periods 33.43 and 100.4 years.

== Variability ==
The variability of XZ Andromedae was discovered by Henrietta Levitt by examining photographs taken from 1916 to 1919. Variability was confirmed by Arville D. Walker and Priscilla Fairfield. The discovery was announced by Harlow Shapley in 1923. The star, originally known as BD+41 376, received the variable star designation XZ Andromedae in 1924.

Photometric periods of Algol variables matches the orbital period of the system. However, in XZ Andromedae have been observed slight period variations that can be reproduced with three different cycles of 137.5, 36.8 and 11.2 years, respectively. Each of them could be the effect of another faint body orbiting the binary system, but one of the two shorter cycles could also be an effect of magnetic interaction between stars (the Applegate mechanism).

Other research states that the long cycle is instead a long-term period increase caused by mass transfer from the secondary (that fills its Roche lobe) to the primary component.
