= SDSS 1557 =

Binary system in the constellation Serpens

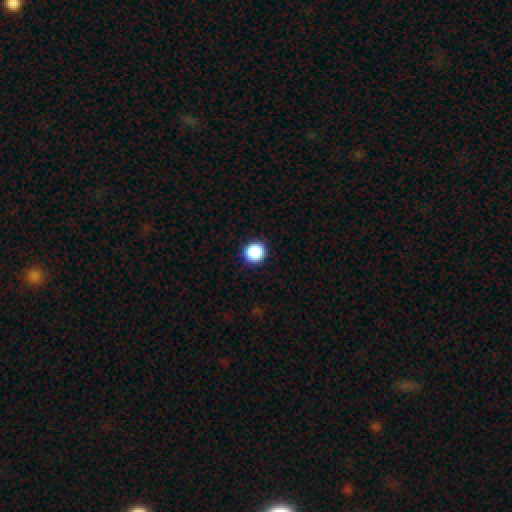
- An image of SDSS 1557. Credit: Legacy Surveys / D. Lang (Perimeter Institute) & Meli thev

Observation data Epoch J2000 Equinox J2000
- Constellation: Serpens
- Right ascension: 15^{h} 57^{m} 20.77^{s}
- Declination: +09° 16′ 24.6″

Characteristics
- Evolutionary stage: post common envelope binary: white dwarf + brown dwarf
- Spectral type: DAZ + L4±1

Astrometry
Proper motion (μ)	RA: −10.202±0.198 mas/yr Dec.: −25.988±0.197 mas/yr
Parallax (π)	1.7767±0.1974 mas
Distance	approx. 1631 ly (500.0+19.8 −18.0 pc)

Orbit
Primary	SDSS 1557A
Name	SDSS 1557B
Period (P)	2.273153±0.000002 hrs
Semi-major axis (a)	0.70±0.02 R_{☉}
Inclination (i)	80±3°
Semi-amplitude (K_{1}) (primary)	40.42±0.69 km/s
Semi-amplitude (K_{2}) (secondary)	288.3±3.0 km/s

Details

SDSS 1557A
Mass	0.447±0.043 M_{☉}
Radius	0.0162±0.0012 R_{☉}
Surface gravity (log g)	7.63±0.11 cgs
Temperature	21,800±800 K
Age	33±5 (cooling age) Myr

SDSS 1557B
Mass	66+5 −7 M_{Jup}
Radius	1.054±0.242 R_{Jup}
Temperature	1,400 to 2,500 K

Other designations
- GALEX J155720.8+091625, WD 1554+094, SDSS J155720.78+091624.7, ULAS J155720.77+091624.6, EQ J1557+0916

Database references
SIMBAD	data

SDSS 1557 (SDSS J155720.77+091624.6, WD 1554+094) is a binary system composed of a white dwarf and a brown dwarf. The system is surrounded by a circumbinary debris disk. The debris disk was formed when a minor planet was tidally disrupted around the white dwarf in the past.

== The brown dwarf companion ==
In 2011 it was found that the system did show Y- and J-band excess, which hinted at a companion. Follow-up observations with instruments on the Gemini Observatory and the Very Large Telescope revealed the secondary, the brown dwarf SDSS 1557B, and a circumbinary disk around the binary. The researchers measured the radial velocity changes with the help of the Magnesium absorption line at 4482 Å and found that a 66 M_{J} brown dwarf orbits the white dwarf at around 0.7 R_{☉}, with the orbital period being around 2.27 hours. The irradiated brown dwarf also shows a hydrogen-alpha emission line.

Additional follow-up came with Hubble WFC3, using time-resolved spectrophotometry. SDSS 1557B is similar to ultra-short period planets and is likely tidally locked. White dwarfs give off more radiation in the ultra-violet than it is the case for main-sequence stars. This leads to a higher UV-exposure for SDSS 1557B when compared to a regular hot Jupiter. The fact that SDSS 1557B is tidally locked creates vast temperature changes in the dayside and nightside of the brown dwarf. The researchers found that the brown dwarf is inefficient at redistributing the heat from the dayside to the nightside. They also find that the nightside is likely dominated by clouds and the dayside is likely dominated by opaque H^{−} and likely has a temperature inversion.

== The circumbinary disk ==
The system was first suspected to be a white dwarf with a circumstellar disk in 2011 from K-band excess. The system also displayed high metal abundances (Ca, Mg, Si), showing that the white dwarf was polluted with planetary debris.

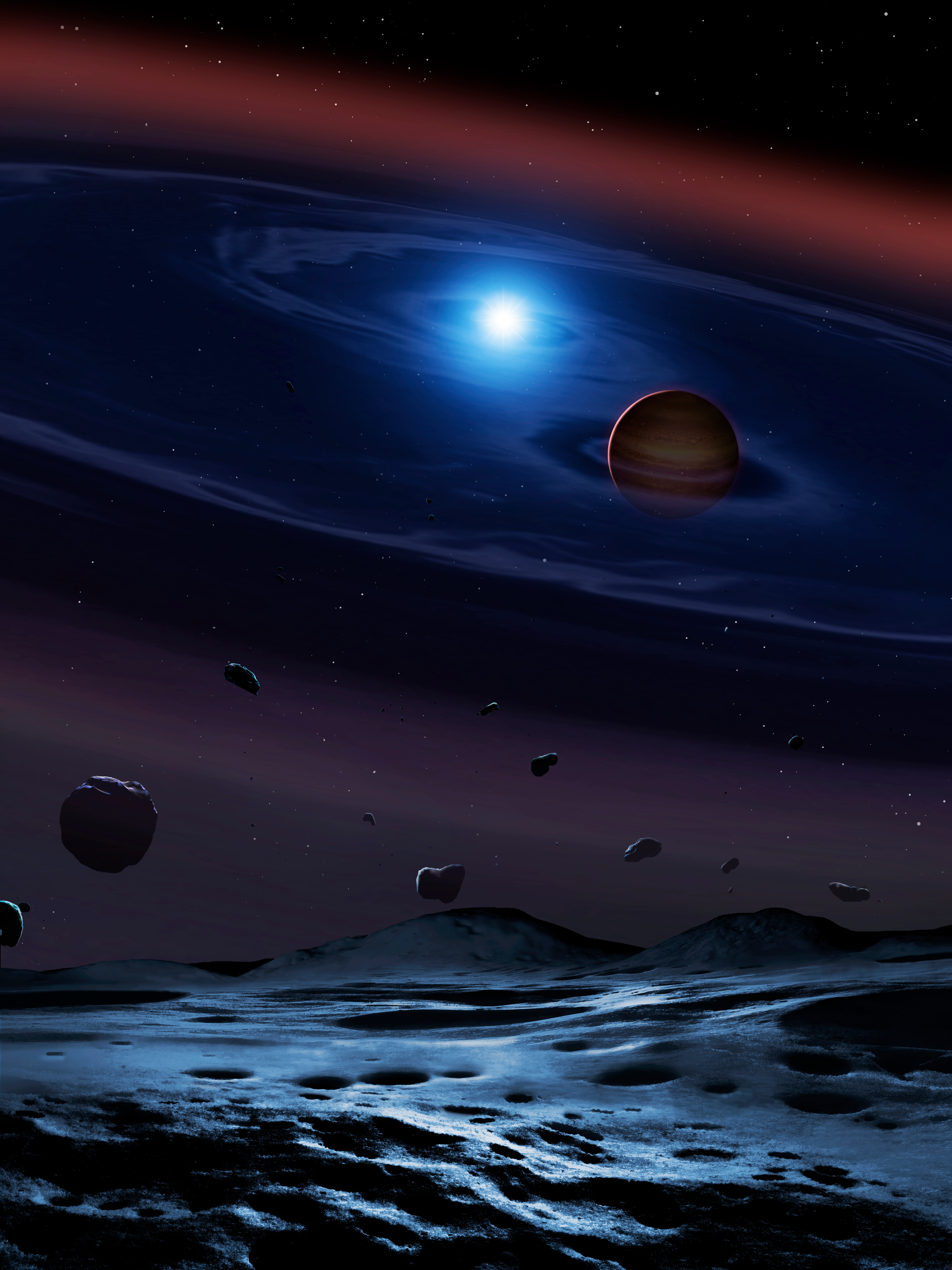
An artist's impression of the system, including the circumstellar disk. Credit:International Gemini Observatory/NOIRLab/NSF/AURA/UCL/University of Warwick/University of Sheffield//Mark Garlick

The disk ring lies at around 3.3 R_{☉}, exterior to the Roche lobe. The dust grains of the disk have a temperature of 1,100 Kelvin (K). The material from the disk crosses the gap between disk and white dwarf in streams. A process that is well known for binaries and seen in other binaries, such as CoRoT 223992193.

== Past evolution of the system ==
The system formed at least 1.5 Gyr ago as a low-mass-ratio binary of a star (1.06–1.85 M_{☉}) and a companion with a semi-major axis of less than one astronomical unit (AU) in the past. The minor planet on the other hand had an orbit that was larger than a few AU. The brown dwarf was engulfed when the star became a giant, an evolutionary stage known as common envelope. Around 33 Myrs ago the common envelope was ejected, forming a low-mass Helium core white dwarf. This formed the present binary, called SDSS 1557. A minor planet, likely an asteroid larger than 4 km, with a mass of at least 10^{14} kg survived the giant phase of the star. It was scattered towards the binary and tidally disrupted by the white dwarf when it crossed the Roche radius. The resulting debris cloud became the disk we see today.

== See also ==
- List of exoplanets and planetary debris around white dwarfs
- Post common envelope binary
- WD 0137−349 another white dwarf-brown dwarf binary
