= Excede =

Excede may refer to:

- A brand name of the medication ceftiofur
- Exoplanetary Circumstellar Environments and Disk Explorer, a planned space telescope
