= HIP 65426 b =

Gas giant exoplanet orbiting HIP 65426

HIP 65426 b / Najsakopajk
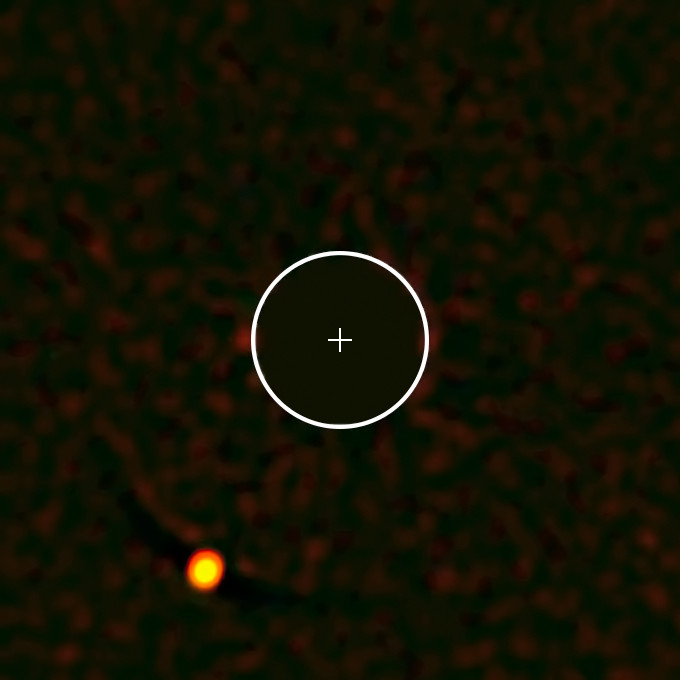
- HIP 65426 b is on the lower left of the image, with the circle representing what Neptune's orbit would look like around the star HIP 65426, represented by a small cross.

Discovery
- Discovered by: SPHERE consortium
- Discovery date: 6 July 2017
- Detection method: Direct imaging

Designations
- Alternative names: Najsakopajk

Orbital characteristics
- Semi-major axis: 87+108 −31 AU
- Inclination: 100°+15° −6°
- Star: HIP 65426

Physical characteristics
- Mean radius: 1.44±0.03 R_{J}
- Mass: 7.1±1.2 M_{J}
- Surface gravity: 3.93+0.07 −0.09 dex
- Temperature: 1,283+25 −31 K

HIP 65426 b, also named Najsakopajk, is a super-Jupiter exoplanet orbiting the star HIP 65426. It was discovered on 6 July 2017 by the SPHERE consortium using the Spectro-Polarimetric High-Contrast Exoplanet Research (SPHERE) instrument belonging to the European Southern Observatory (ESO), being the first confirmed planet discovered by the SPHERE instrument. (Note: HD 131399 Ab was claimed to be detected earlier via SPHERE, but it was later shown to be an unrelated background object.) It is 351 light-years from Earth in the constellation Centaurus.

== Nomenclature ==
HIP 65426 b is a designation inherited from the host star's name, HIP 65426, following the exoplanet naming convention, where exoplanets receive lowercase letters. The designation HIP 65426 has its origin on the Hipparcos catalogue.

In August 2022, this planet and its host star were included among 20 systems to be named by the third NameExoWorlds project. The approved names, proposed by a team from Mexico, were announced in June 2023. HIP 65426 b is named Najsakopajk and its host star is named Matza, after Zoque words for "Mother Earth" and "star".

== Overview ==
The exoplanet HIP 65426 b orbits its host star HIP 65426, an A-type main-sequence star with apparent magnitude 7.01, with a mass of 1.96±0.04 M_{☉}, a radius of 1.77±0.05 R_{☉} and an effective temperature of 8,840 K (8,570 °C). This planetary system is located in the constellation Centaurus. The planet is around 14 million years old, much younger than the Solar System which is 4.5 billion years old, but is not associated with a debris disk, despite its young age, causing it to not fit current models for planetary formation. It is around 92 AU from its parent star, with a possible dusty atmosphere. It was discovered as part of the SHINE program, which aimed to find planetary systems around 600 new stars.

In September 2022, HIP 65426 b became the first exoplanet directly observed by the James Webb Space Telescope.

== Planetary atmosphere ==
The spectrum taken in 2020 has indicated that HIP 65426 b is carbon-poor and oxygen-rich compared to Solar System gas giants.

Spectral analysis of data from the James Webb Space Telescope revealed strong evidence of silicate clouds containing enstatite with no evidence of a dusty atmosphere.

== James Webb Space Telescope observations ==
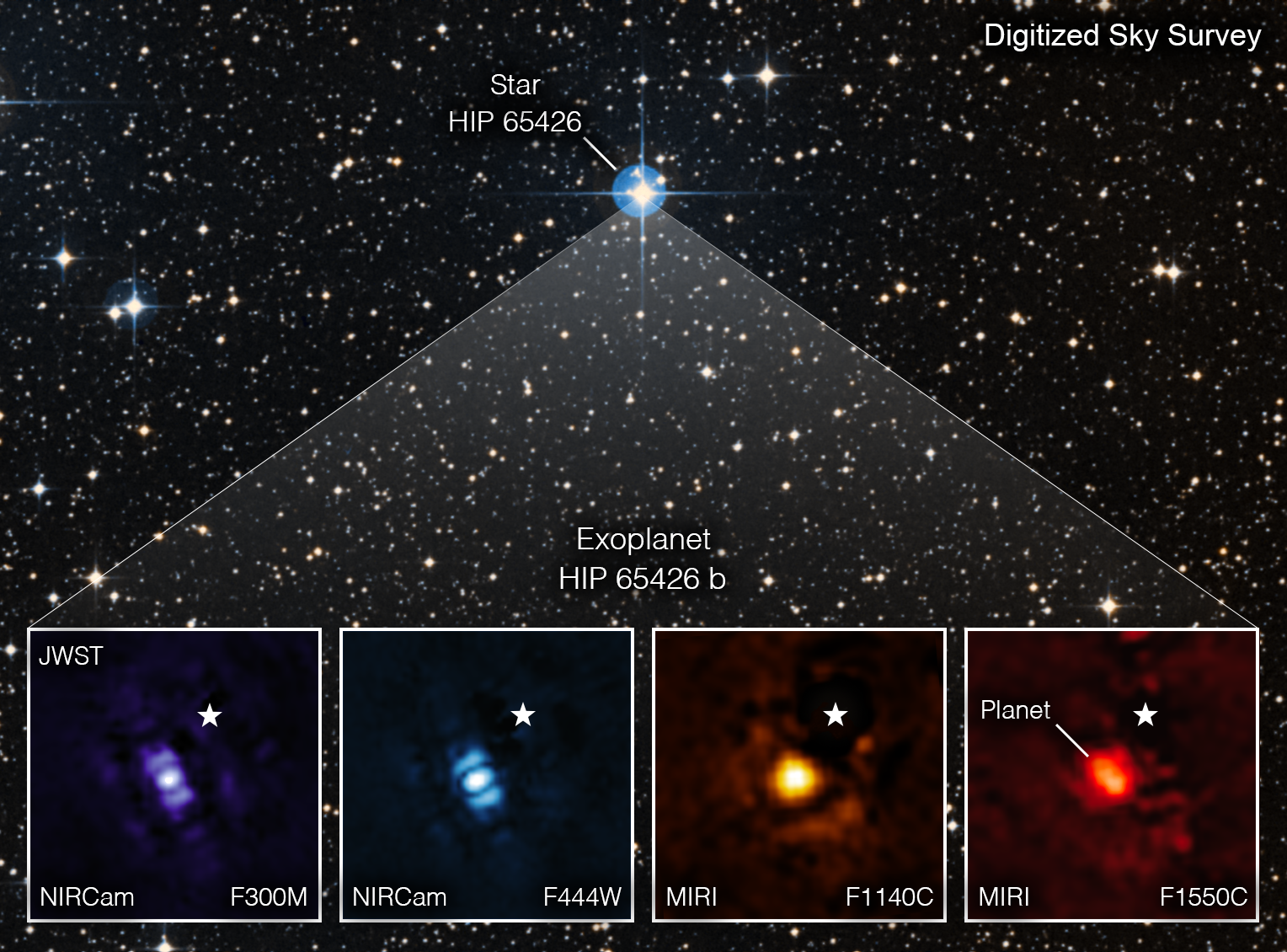
HIP 65426 b viewed by the James Webb Space Telescope (August 2022)

In August 2022, a pre-print of the James Webb Space Telescope (JWST) observations was published. The JWST direct imaging observations between 2-16 μm of HIP 65426 b tightly constrained its bolometric luminosity to $\log(L_{bol}/L_{sun})=-4.23\plusmn0.08$, which provides a robust mass constraint of 7.1±1.2 M_{J}. Evolutionary models suggest a radius 45% larger than that of Jupiter and an effective temperature of 1,283 K (1,010 °C). Atmospheric models suggest lower radii down to 0.9 R_{J} and higher temperatures, but these results are unreliable. The team also constrained the semi-major axis and the inclination of the planet, but the new JWST astrometry of the planet did not significantly improve the orbit of the planet, especially the eccentricity remains unconstrained.

HIP 65426 b is the first exoplanet to be imaged by JWST and the first to be detected in wavelengths beyond 5 μm. The observations demonstrate that the James Webb Space Telescope will exceed its nominal predicted performance by a factor of 10 and that it will be able to image 0.3 M_{J} planets at 100 au for main-sequence stars, Neptune and Uranus-mass objects at 100-200 au for M-dwarfs and Saturn-mass objects at 10 au for M-dwarfs. For α Cen A JWST might be able to push the limit to a 5 R_{🜨} planet at 0.5 to 2.5 au.

== See also ==
- Lists of exoplanets
- List of exoplanets discovered in 2017
