= HIP 65426 =

Star in the constellation Centaurus

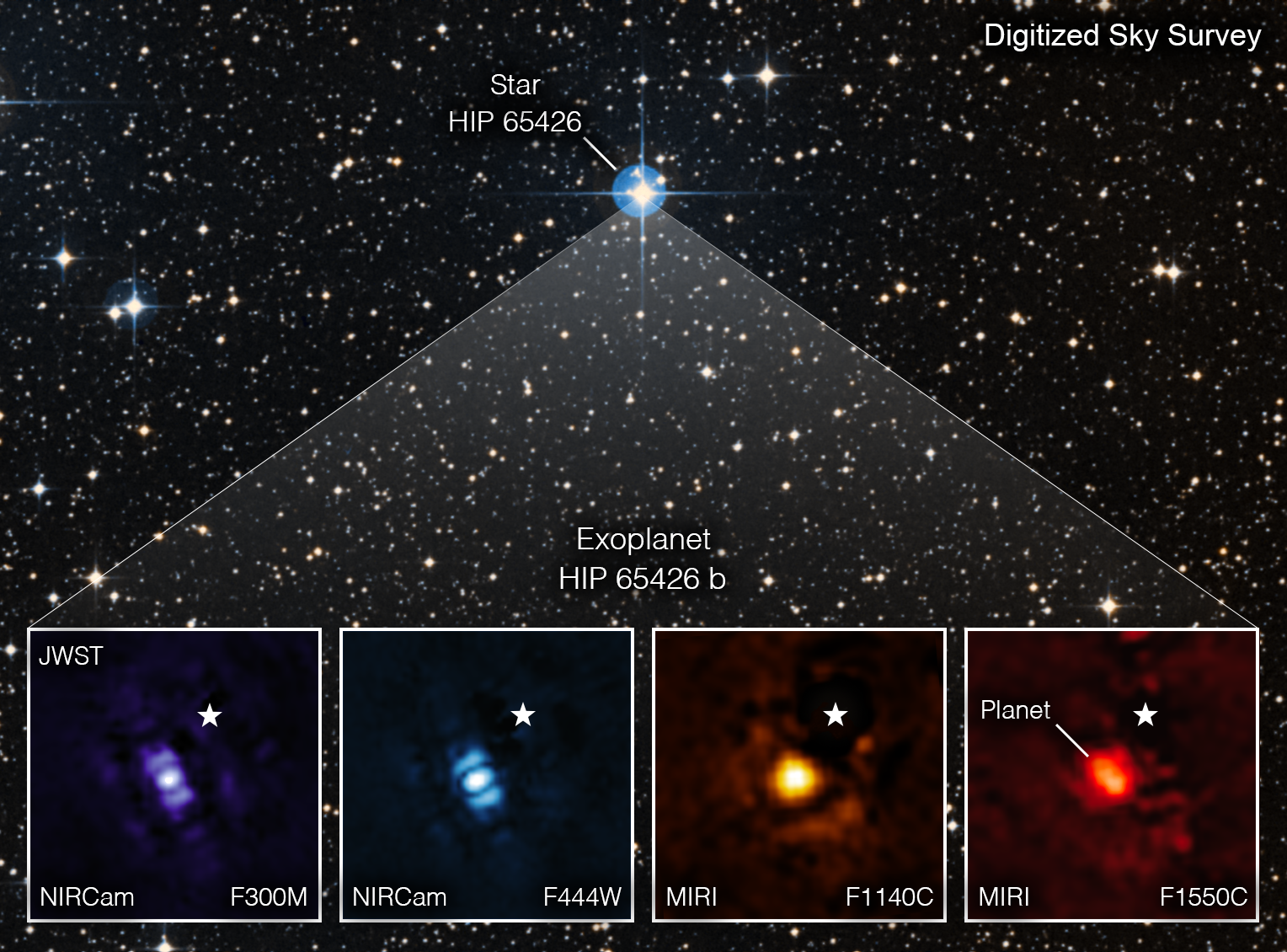
- HIP 65426 (top) and its planet (inset) seen by the James Webb Space Telescope

Observation data Epoch J2000 Equinox ICRS
- Constellation: Centaurus
- Right ascension: 13^{h} 24^{m} 36.09774^{s}
- Declination: −51° 30′ 16.0447″
- Apparent magnitude (V): 7.01

Characteristics
- Evolutionary stage: main sequence
- Spectral type: A2V
- B−V color index: 0.093
- Variable type: Delta Scuti

Astrometry
Radial velocity (R_{v})	+9.77±0.71 km/s
Proper motion (μ)	RA: −33.921 mas/yr Dec.: −18.917 mas/yr
Parallax (π)	9.3031±0.0346 mas
Distance	351 ± 1 ly (107.5 ± 0.4 pc)
Absolute magnitude (M_{V})	2.06

Details
Mass	1.96±0.04 M_{☉}
Radius	1.77±0.05 R_{☉}
Temperature	8840±200 K
Rotational velocity (v sin i)	299±9 km/s
Age	14±4 Myr

Other designations
- Matza, CD−50 7747, GC 18126, HD 116434, HIP 65426, SAO 240811, PPM 341872, WDS J13246-5130

Database references
SIMBAD	data
Exoplanet Archive	data

HIP 65426, also named Matza, is an A-type main-sequence star about 351 light-years (108 parsecs) away in the constellation Centaurus. With an apparent magnitude of 7.01, it is too faint to be visible to the naked eye. It hosts one known exoplanet, HIP 65426 b.

== Nomenclature ==
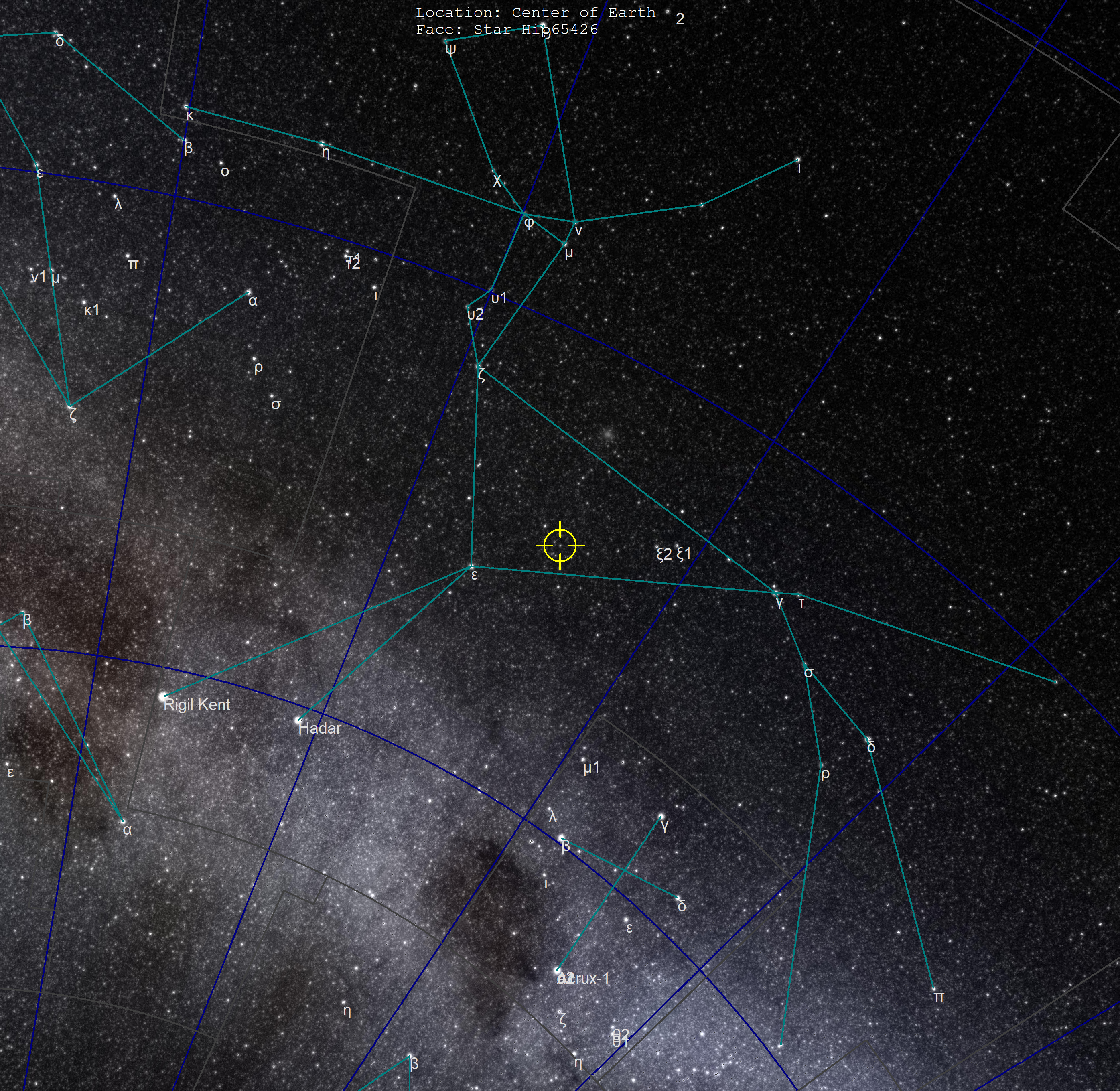
Location of HIP 65426 in Centaurus

The designation HIP 65426 comes from the Hipparcos catalog; other designations include HD 116434 in the Henry Draper Catalog.

This was one of the 20 systems selected to be named in the third NameExoWorlds campaign, beginning in August 2022. The approved names, proposed by a team from Mexico, were announced in June 2023. The star is named Matza and its planet is named Najsakopajk; Matza means "a star in the sky" or "somebody that shines within" in the Zoque language, while Najsakopajk refers to "Mother Earth".

== Properties ==
This is a young A-type main-sequence star with a stellar classification of A2V, making it larger and hotter than the Sun. It is estimated to be about 14 million years old (for comparison, the Solar System is about 4.6 billion years old), and is a member of the Lower Centaurus-Crux association of young stars. It is a Delta Scuti variable. It is a rapidly rotating star, exhibiting differential rotation with two periods of 7.85±0.08 and 6.67±0.04 hours, and is seen nearly edge-on, rotating at an inclination of 107°+12°
−11° to the plane of the sky.

While it is listed in catalogs such as the Washington Double Star Catalog, HIP 65426 is a single star, with no known companions other than its planet. A brown dwarf designated 2MASS J13242119-5129503 was considered as a possible very distant companion, but found not to be.

== Planetary system ==
The planet HIP 65426 b, later named Najsakopajk, is a massive super-Jupiter on a wide orbit, discovered in 2017 by direct imaging. It was the first exoplanet discovered by the SPHERE instrument on the Very Large Telescope, and in 2022 became the first exoplanet to be imaged by the James Webb Space Telescope (JWST). The planetary orbit is aligned with the host star's equator.

Unlike most young planet-hosting stars, no circumstellar disk has been observed around HIP 65426. JWST observations have not detected any additional planets, ruling out companions more massive than about 10 M_{J} at distances of 10–20 au from the star.

The HIP 65426 planetary system
Companion (in order from star)	Mass	Semimajor axis (AU)	Orbital period (days)	Eccentricity	Inclination (°)	Radius
b / Najsakopajk	7.1±1.2 M_{J}	74.6+14.9 −10.0	—	0.30±0.17	105.2+2.5 −1.9	1.44±0.03 R_{J}
