= HD 101584 =

Star in the constellation Centaurus

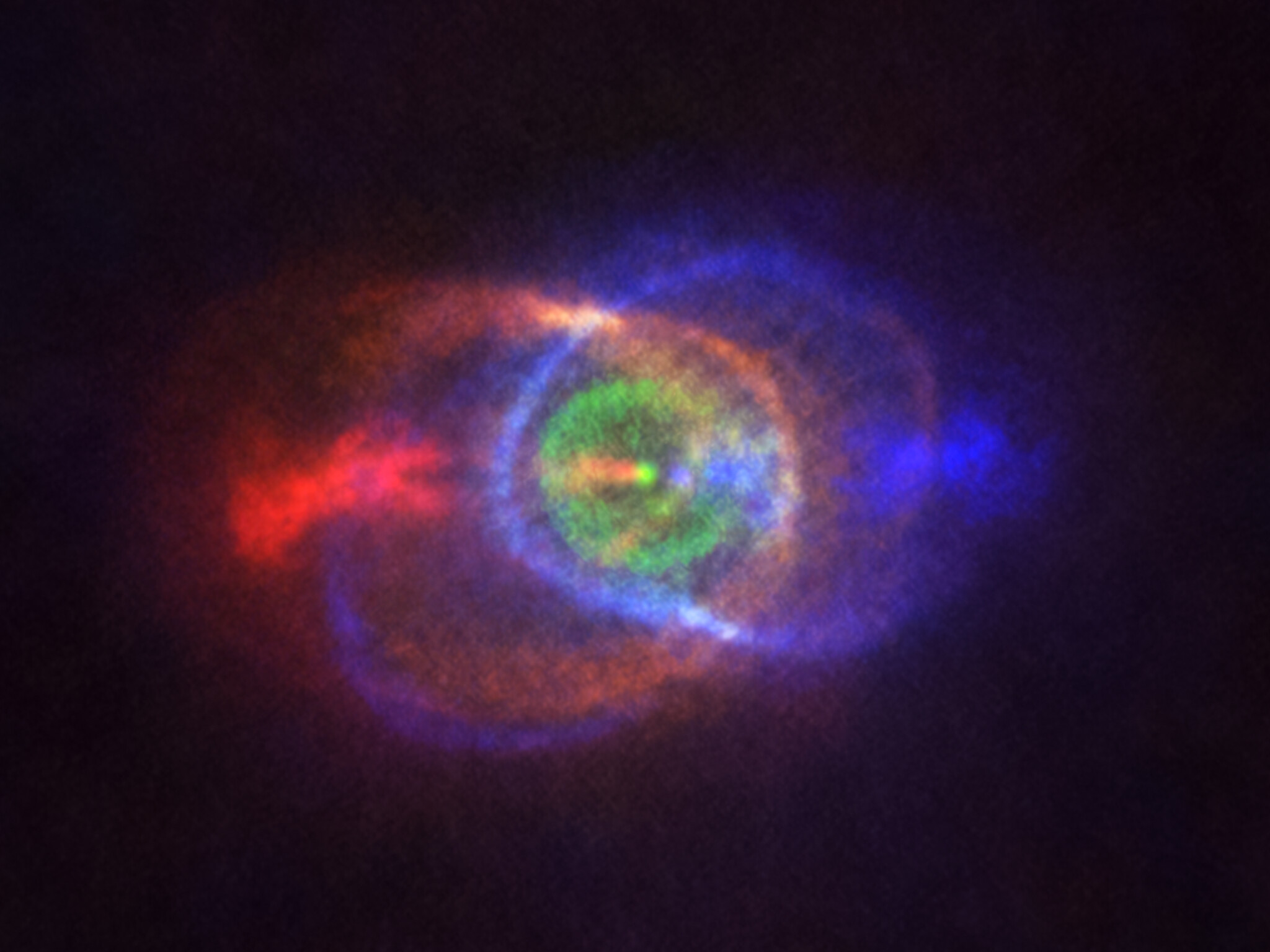
- HD 101584 seen by ALMA. The blue component moves towards the observer and the red component moves away from the observer. The green component has the same speed as the binary system, seen as a green point source in the middle. Credit: ALMA (ESO/NAOJ/NRAO), Olofsson et al. Acknowledgement: Robert Cumming

Observation data Epoch J2000.0 Equinox ICRS
- Constellation: Centaurus
- Right ascension: 11^{h} 40^{m} 58.80515^{s}
- Declination: −55° 34′ 25.8147″
- Apparent magnitude (V): 7.01

Characteristics
- Spectral type: A6Ia

Astrometry
Proper motion (μ)	RA: −7.935 mas/yr Dec.: −0.243 mas/yr
Parallax (π)	0.5452±0.0199 mas
Distance	6,000 ± 200 ly (1,830 ± 70 pc)

Details

supergiant
Mass	0.5 - 1 M_{☉}
Radius	18.6 R_{☉}
Luminosity	1,600 L_{☉} (@1kpc) (400 - 5,000) L_{☉}
Temperature	8,500 K

companion
Mass	0.27 - 0.41 M_{☉}

Other designations
- IRAS 11385−5517, V885 Centauri, HIP 56992, 2MASS J11405880−5534258

Database references
SIMBAD	data

HD 101584 is a suspected post-common envelope binary about 1,800 to 5,900 light-years distant in the constellation of Centaurus. The system is bright at optical wavelengths with an apparent visual magnitude of about 7. The primary is either a post-AGB star, but more likely a post-RGB star. The secondary is a red dwarf or possibly a low-luminosity white dwarf, which orbits the primary every 150-200 days. The system is surrounded by a slowly rotating circumbinary disk, probably with a face-on orientation towards the Solar System and a size of about 150 astronomical units.

== Variability ==
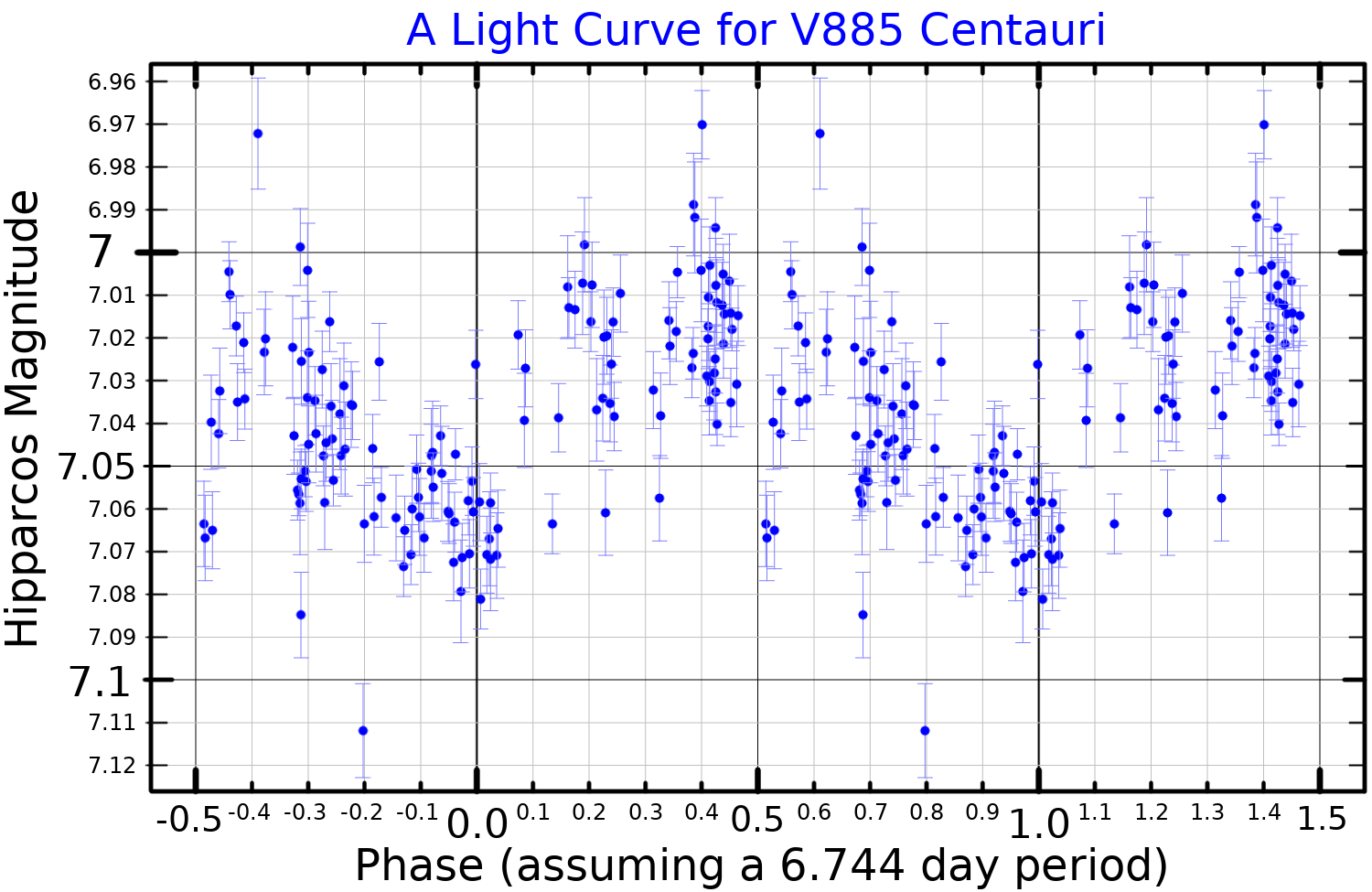
A light curve for V885 Centauri, plotted from Hipparcos data

In 1991, Jean Manfroid et al. published photometry that showed that HD 101584 is a variable star. HD 101584 has been given the variable star designation V885 Centauri. The International Variable Star Index states that the star varies between visual magnitude 6.90 and 7.02, over a period of 87.9 days. However Koen and Eyer detected, in the star's Hipparcos data, an oscillation of the star's brightness with a period of 6.744 days and an amplitude of only 0.02 magnitudes.

== Nebula ==
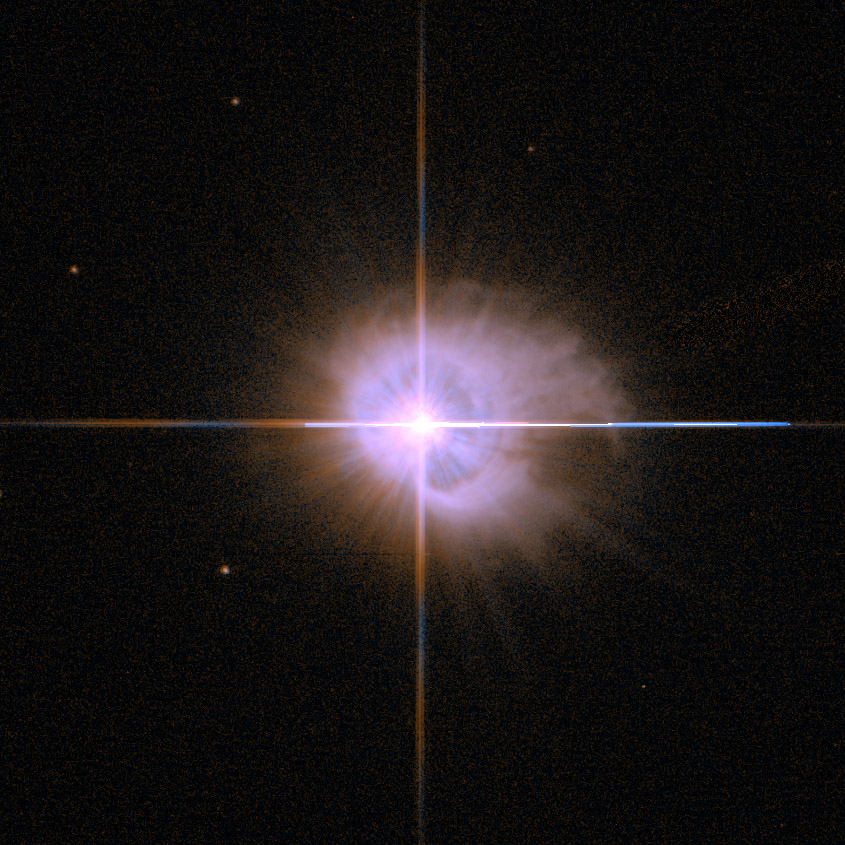
HD 101584 and the surrounding nebula, seen by Hubble

The Hubble Space Telescope image shows a diffuse circumstellar environment with a circular ring around HD 101584. ALMA mapped the nebula around HD 101584 and was able to map the region close to the central binary. The nebula consists of a central compact source, an equatorial density enhancement (disk), a high-velocity bipolar outflow and an hourglass structure surrounding the outflow. The outflow reaches a maximum velocity of about 150 km/s and is inclined to the line of sight by 10+10
−5°. There is evidence for a second bipolar outflow with a different orientation from the major outflow. The inner disk, heated to 1540 K, currently has been sublimated by the increasing luminosity of the star.

== Evolution ==
The companion of this system was captured a few hundred years ago, for example when the red giant reached its critical size. It spiralled towards the red giant but stopped before it merged with the core of the primary. During this stage the outer layers of the red giant were ejected. During the common envelope phase the red giant phase of the primary was terminated and the core was revealed. Later, the bipolar jets formed and met the ejected material, forming the hourglass-shaped structure. Ejected material shows prominent spectral features of magnesium, while outer ejected structures contain methanol and formaldehyde.
