= Nautilus Deep Space Observatory =

Array of space telescopes

- Mission type: Exoplanet observation
- Operator: University of Arizona
- Website: nautilus-array.space
- Mission duration: > 5 years

Spacecraft properties
- Dimensions: Spherical 14 m (46 ft) inflatable spacecraft

Start of mission
- Rocket: Suggested: Starship or SLS

Orbital parameters
- Reference system: Sun-Earth L_{2}

Main telescope
- Type: Diffractive optic
- Diameter: 8.5 m (330 in)
- Wavelengths: 0.5 – 1.7 μm (visible and near-infrared)

Instruments
- Spectrographs: NAVIIS-VIS and NAVIIS-NIR

Nautilus Deep Space Observatory (NDSO) (also known as Nautilus array, Nautilus mission, Nautilus program, Nautilus telescope array and Project Nautilus) is a proposed deep space fleet of space telescopes designed to search for biosignatures of life in the atmospheres of exoplanets.

Daniel Apai, lead astronomer of NDSO from the University of Arizona, and associated with the Steward Observatory and the Lunar and Planetary Laboratory, commented "[With this new space telescope technology], we will be able to vastly increase the light-collecting power of telescopes, and among other science, study the atmospheres of 1,000 potentially Earth-like planets for signs of life."

== Overview ==
The NDSO mission is based on the development of very lightweight telescope mirrors that enhance the power of space telescopes, while substantially lowering manufacturing and launch costs. The concept is based not on traditional reflective optics but on diffractive optics, employing a single diffractive lens made of a multiorder diffractive engineered (MODE) material. A MODE lens is ten times lighter and 100 times less susceptible to misalignments than conventional lightweight large telescope mirrors.

The NDSO mission proposes to launch a fleet of 35 space telescopes, each one a 14 m (550 in) wide spherical telescope, and each featuring an 8.5 m (330 in) diameter lens. Each of these space telescopes would be more powerful than the 6.5 m (260 in) mirror of the James Webb Space Telescope, the 2.4 m (94 in) wide mirror of the Hubble Space Telescope, and the 1.1 m × 0.7 m (43 in × 28 in) mirror of the Ariel space telescope combined. The NDSO telescope array of 35 spacecraft, when used all together, would have the resolving power equivalent to a 50 m (2,000 in) diameter telescope. With such telescopic power, the NDSO would be able to analyze the atmospheres of 1,000 exoplanets up to 1,000 light years away.

In January 2019, the NDSO research team, which includes lead astronomer Daniel Apai, as well as Tom Milster, Dae Wook Kim and Ronguang Liang from the University of Arizona College of Optical Sciences, and Jonathan Arenberg from Northrop Grumman Aerospace Systems, received a $1.1 million support grant from the Moore Foundation in order to construct a prototype of a single telescope, and test it on the 1.5 m (61 in) Kuiper Telescope before December 2020.

== Spacecraft ==
Each individual Nautilus unit has a single solid MODE lens and would be packed in stackable form for a shared rocket launch, and once deployed, each unit would inflate into a 14 m (46 ft) diameter Mylar balloon with the instrument payload in the center.

== See also ==
- Astrobiology
- Biosignature
- Carl Sagan Institute
- SISTINE - another way to search for life on exoplanets
