= Rebecca Oppenheimer =

American astrophysicist (born 1972)

- Born: 1972 (age 53–54); New York, New York
- Education: Columbia University (BA); California Institute of Technology (PhD)
- Known for: Astrophysics; Cosmology; Activism
- Scientific career
- Fields: Astrophysics, chemistry, materials science
- Workplaces: American Museum of Natural History; Columbia University
- Thesis: Brown Dwarf Companions of Nearby Stars (1999)
- Doctoral advisor: S. R. Kulkarni; Gibor Basri (postdoc)

Rebecca Oppenheimer (born in 1972) is an American astrophysicist and comparative exoplanetary scientist. She is one of the five curators and professors in the Department of Astrophysics at the American Museum of Natural History (AMNH). Her optics laboratory in the Rose Center for Earth and Space is where new astronomical instruments are built and designed to tackle the issue of directly seeing and taking spectra of nearby planetary systems. Oppenheimer is the co-discoverer of the first brown dwarf and was the first scientist to study the atmospheric composition, chemistry, and physics of a sub-stellar object outside the Solar System with the ultimate goal of finding life outside the Solar System.

== Early life and education ==
Oppenheimer grew up on the Upper West Side of New York City. At Horace Mann High School, she worked at the Goddard Institute for Space Studies and modeled river flow with computers until she graduated in 1990. She attended Columbia University, received her B.A. in Physics, and was an I. I. Rabi Science Scholar in 1994. After college, Oppenheimer went to the California Institute of Technology for her Ph.D. in astrophysics and spent the following two years at the University of California at Berkeley on a Hubble Space Telescope Postdoctoral Research Fellowship. In 2001, she moved back to New York City to conduct astrophysics research at the AMNH and soon joined the faculty in 2004.

At the California Institute of Technology, Oppenheimer, toward her Ph.D. with astronomer Shrinivas Kulkarni (the two met when Kulkarni gave a lecture at Columbia) used the AOC (Adaptive Optics Coronagraph) that was installed on a telescope. In 1994, Oppenheimer joined Kulkarni’s team in which they worked to discover a brown dwarf. After being a co-discoverer of the first brown dwarf, Gliese 229B, and is active in research on exoplanets, Oppenheimer continued to study brown dwarfs and currently holds a professorship at Columbia University’s Department of Astronomy.

== Career ==
While Oppenheimer works with brown dwarfs, she also works on ultracool white dwarfs, the end states of 99% of stars, roles in comprising the baryonic dark matter, and coronagraphs, the art of seeing faint celestial objects next to bright ones. Oppenheimer has led and co-led novel instrumentation projects that she and her team deploy to study nearby planetary systems. These include the Lyot Project (considered the world’s most sensitive coronagraph in 2004), Project 1640, the Gemini Planet Imager, Palomar Adaptive Optics, and the Palomar Advanced Radial Velocity Instrument.

Currently, Oppenheimer is an active member of the American Astronomical Society (AAS) and the International Astronomical Union (IAU), holding affiliations in groups A, B, C, D, F, and G. Throughout her career, she has participated in multiple NASA advisory committees, including the Terrestrial Planet Finder (TPF) Science and Technology Definition Team and the NASA Astrophysics Senior Review in 2014, 2016, and 2019. Additionally, she has served on various committees for the National Science Foundation (NSF) and the National Research Council (NRC). Oppenheimer has also been a member of NASA's Exoplanet Technology Assessment Committee since 2015.

Oppenheimer's educational initiatives at the American Museum of Natural History (AMNH) include curating the Astro Bulletin series, which features news items and biannual documentaries. She serves as the Curator-in-Charge of the Digital Universe Atlas and co-curated the space show "Journey to the Stars." Additionally, she curated the exhibit titled "Searching for New Worlds." Her video, The Known Universe, was created as part of an exhibit with the Rubin Museum and is an early example of a science video going viral on YouTube in 2009. She also appears in and wrote the film Missing Memories of the Universe directed by Ali Alvarez.

== Articles ==
She has published over 300 research and public-oriented science articles including three patents. According to Google Scholar, Oppenheimer's peer-reviewed articles as of 2025 have been cited almost 15,000 times. Her h-index is 61 and i10-index is 161.

== Awards and honors ==
- 2020: inStyle Magazine, 50 Badass Women of 2020, 16th
- 2019: Fulcrum Arts Honoree for accomplishments at the intersection of science and art
- 2009: Blavatnik Award for Young Scientists, New York Academy of Sciences
- 2003: Carter Memorial Lecturer, Carter Observatory, Wellington, New Zealand
- 2002-2004: Kalbfleisch Research Fellowship, American Museum of Natural History
- 2002: National Academies of Science, Beckman Frontiers of Science, Invited Participant
- 1999-2002: Hubble Postdoctoral Research Fellowship
- 1994-1997: National Science Foundation Graduate Research Fellowship
- 1990-1994: I.I. Rabi Science Scholar, Columbia University
- 1990: Westinghouse Science Competition, Honorable Mention
- 1989: New York Academy of Sciences Science Writing Competition, First Place

== Personal life ==
Rebecca came out in 2014 as a transgender woman and was featured in a New York Times article where she discussed what it meant to be an LGBTQ+ activist, transgender, human, and a scientist all in one. “I think that makes a lot of people feel more comfortable being themselves in the field,” said Oppenheimer about coming out in a 2020 interview with CCT (College Columbia Today).
