= K 1-2 =

Planetary nebula in the constellation Pyxis

Emission nebula
- Planetary nebula

Observation data: J2000.0 epoch
- Right ascension: 08^{h} 57^{m} 45.99^{s}
- Declination: −28° 57′ 36.8″
- Constellation: Pyxis

Physical characteristics
- Radius: ly
- Absolute magnitude (V): -
- Notable features: -
- Designations: VW Pyxidis (central star), IRAS 08556-2846

K1-2 is a planetary nebula in the constellation Pyxis. It was discovered by Czech astronomer Luboš Kohoutek in 1961. The central star of the nebula—VW Pyxidis—is a post-common-envelope binary composed of a hot degenerate star and a cooler companion in a close orbit. A best-fit calculation from its orbit and spectra yields a white dwarf-like star with around 50% of the Sun's mass and a main sequence lie star around 70% as massive as the Sun. Jets of matter are emanating from the system. One study yielded a surface temperature of 85,000 K for the hotter star.
