= The Habitable Exoplanet Hunting Project =

International astronomers collective working to identify human-habitable exoplanets

The Habitable Exoplanet Hunting Project is an international network of both professional and amateur astronomers. As of December 2019, the network comprises 32 observatories located worldwide, including universities such as the University of South Africa, the University of Saskatchewan in Canada, and the California Polytechnic State University.

The participants are searching for new potentially habitable exoplanets around non-flare G, K or M-type stars located within 100 light years. The initial list of targets consists of 10 stars that already have known transiting exoplanets outside the habitable zone.

The network is monitoring 24/7 each star at a time during several months. Despite G and K-type stars are the main targets of the project, the team is initially focusing on red dwarfs because it take less time to discard the existence of potentially habitable exoplanets around these types of stars.

Most of the observatories are able to detect transit depths as low as 0.1% and exoplanets with a radius of 0.7 Earth radii. To search for new exoplanets, the team is using two different methods: transit photometry and transit duration variation.

Overall, the project is a new approach to the quest for exoplanets in which a large network of astronomers located in the five continents have the time to continuously observe each star individually during long periods of time in the search for dips in brightness produced by transiting exoplanets.

As of December 2019, the network has already conducted observations on GJ 436 and GJ 1214, with a new campaign on GJ 3470 starting in January 2020. In July 2020, the group reported the discovery of GJ 3470 c.

== See also ==
- List of exoplanet search projects
