= New Mexico Exoplanet Spectroscopic Survey Instrument =

Astronomical observational instrument

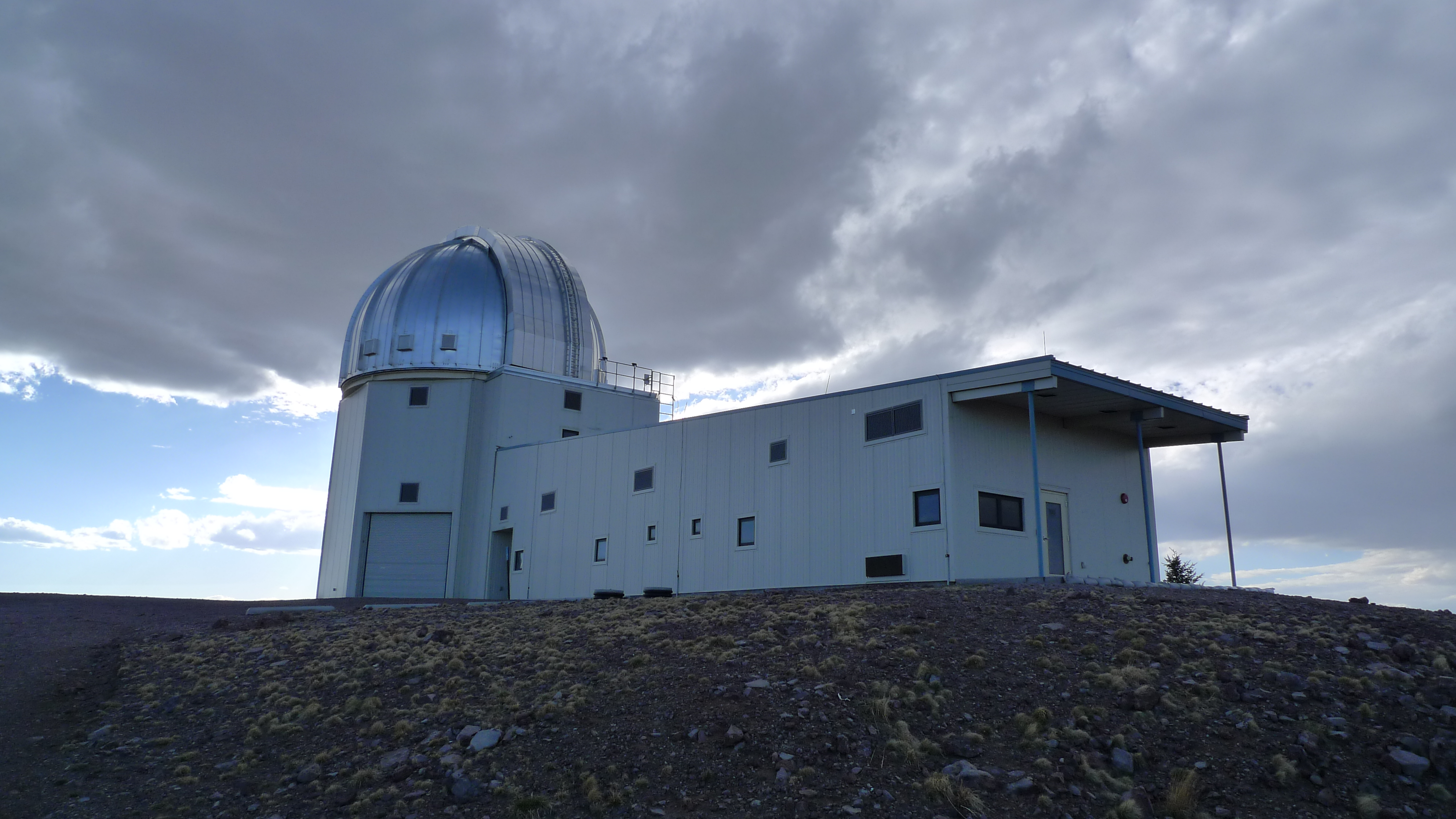
- The 2.4 meter Telescope at Magdalena Ridge Observatory
- Alternative names: NESSI

The New Mexico Exoplanet Spectroscopic Survey Instrument (NESSI) is a ground-based near-infrared spectrographic system specifically designed to study the atmospheres of exoplanets. The NESSI instrument was mounted in 2014 on a 2.4 meter telescope at the Magdalena Ridge Observatory in Socorro County, New Mexico, USA, achieving first light on 7 April 2014.

== Overview ==
NESSI, a $3.5 million instrument, is the first purpose-built device for the analysis of exoplanet atmospheres, and is expected to have a powerful impact on the field of exoplanet characterization. The Principal Investigator is Michelle Creech-Eakman at the New Mexico Institute of Mining and Technology, working with seven co-investigators from New Mexico Tech, Magdalena Ridge Observatory, and NASA JPL. It is partly funded by NASA's Experimental Program to Stimulate Competitive Research, in partnership with the New Mexico Institute of Mining and Technology.

The NESSI spectroscope was mounted on the institute's 2.4 meter telescope at the Magdalena Ridge Observatory in Socorro County, New Mexico, USA, and its first exoplanet observations began on April 7, 2014. In 2016 a contract was established with JPL to retrofit NESSI with new foreoptics and a mounting collar for use on the Hale Telescope at the Palomar Observatory. NESSI achieved first light on the Hale Telescope in Feb, 2018 and was undertaking a series of observations to establish its sensitivity and precision for exoplanet spectroscopy.

NESSI will capture the spectra of both the star and the planet during the transit and then allow scientists to deduct the composition of the planet's atmosphere. The novel technology is expected to achieve high definition readings by using algorithms to calibrate and compensate for time-variable telluric features and instrumental variability throughout an observation.

== Scientific goals ==
NESSI will be able to detect and study a wide range of wavelengths in the near-infrared region of the light spectrum. NESSI will be used to study about 100 exoplanets, ranging from massive 'super-Earths' to gas giants. It uses a technique called transit spectroscopy, in which a planet is observed as it crosses in front of, then behind, its parent star. The observed light is beamed through a spectrometer that breaks it apart, ultimately revealing chemicals that make up the planet's atmosphere. NESSI is expected to devote about 50 nights per year for surveying exoplanets via infrared spectroscopy.

== See also ==
- HARPS spectrograph
- List of extrasolar planets
- List of exoplanet search projects
