= Spectro-Polarimetric High-Contrast Exoplanet Research =

Instrument at the Very Large Telescope

Coordinates: 24.6274°S 70.4044°W

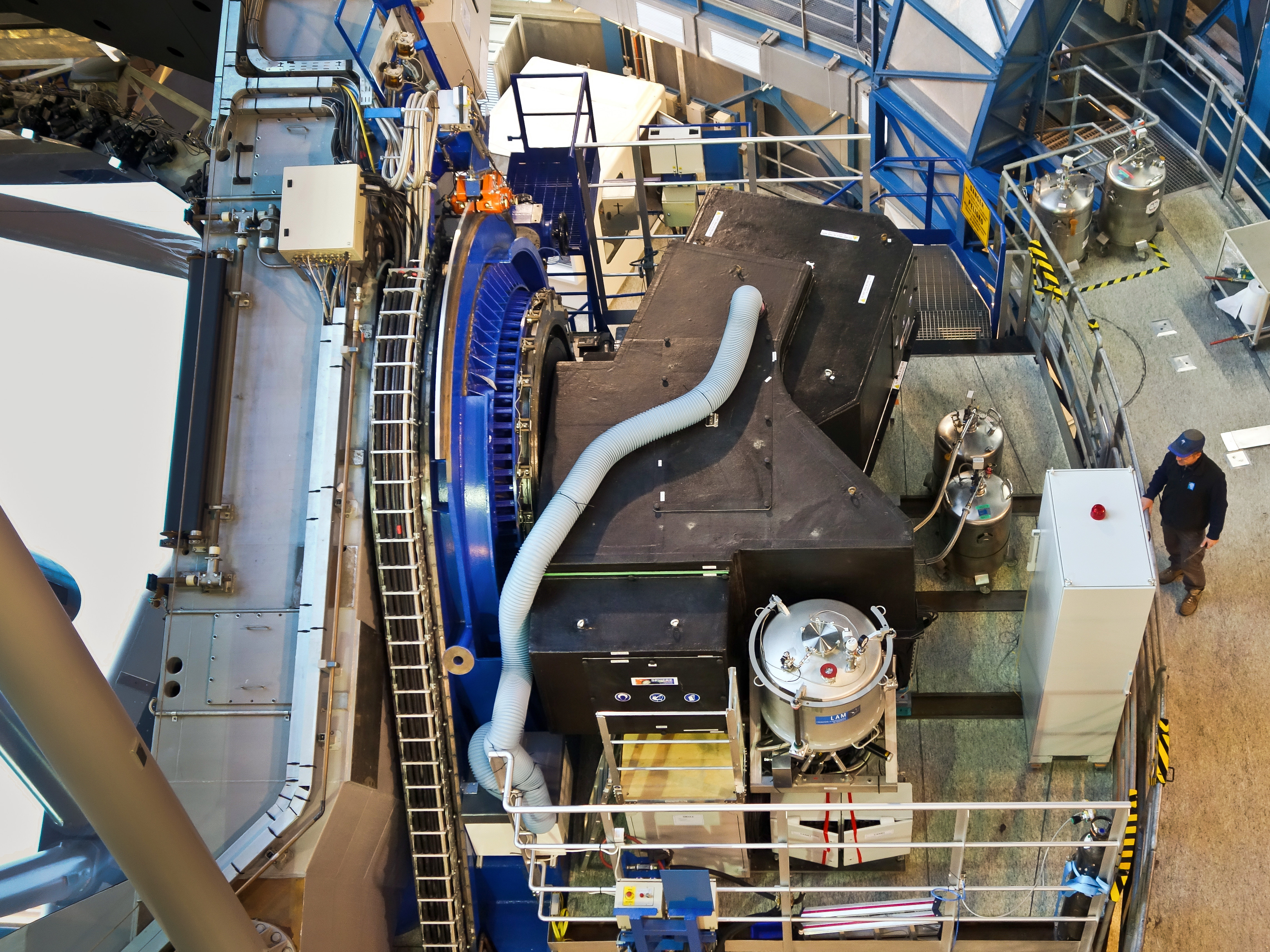
SPHERE (black container and silver cylinder) attached to the telescope from the adjunct platform

Spectro-Polarimetric High-contrast Exoplanet REsearch (VLT-SPHERE) is an adaptive optics system and coronagraphic facility at the Very Large Telescope (VLT). It provides direct imaging as well as spectroscopic and polarimetric characterization of exoplanet systems. The instrument operates in the visible and near infrared, achieving exquisite image quality and contrast over a small field of view around bright targets.

Results from SPHERE complement those from other planet finder projects, which include HARPS, CoRoT, and the Kepler Mission. The instrument was installed on Unit Telescope "Melipal" (UT3) and achieved first light in May, 2014. At the time of installation, it was the latest of a series of second generation VLT-instruments such as X-shooter, KMOS and MUSE.

== Science goals ==
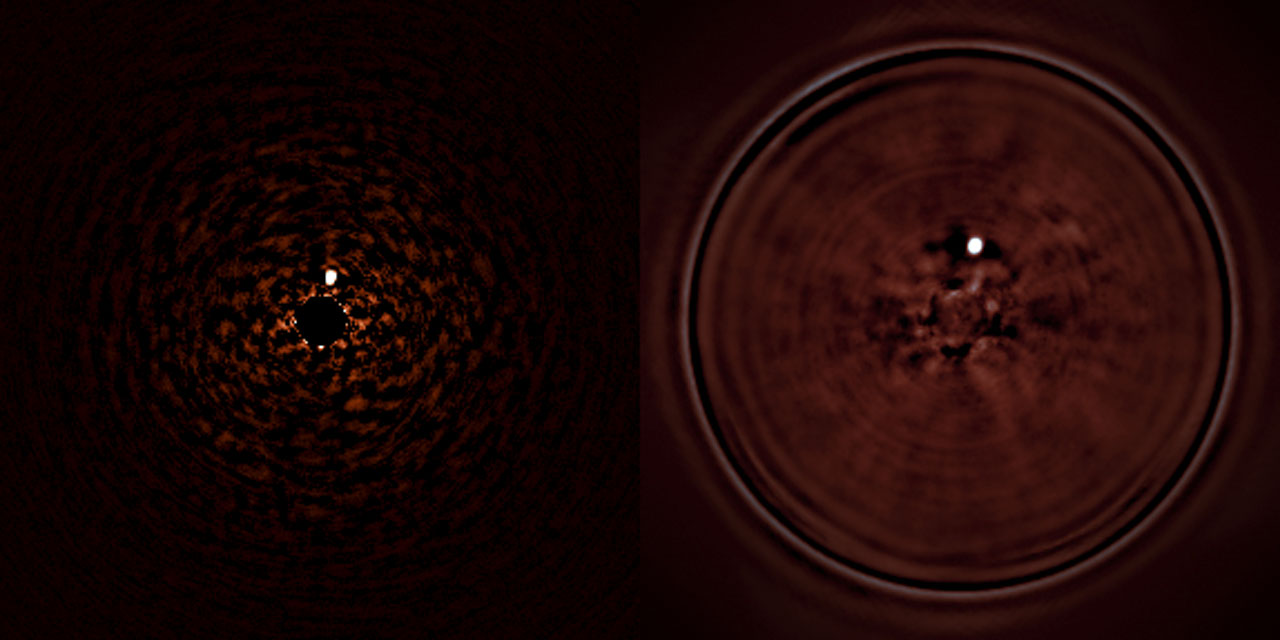
The star HR 7581 (Iota Sgr) was observed in SPHERE survey mode. A very low-mass star, more than 4000 times fainter than its parent star, was discovered orbiting Iota Sgr at a tiny separation of 0.24". The bright star itself has been suppressed almost completely by SPHERE, to allow the faint companion to appear as a clear bright spot to the upper right of the centre.

Direct imaging of exoplanets is extremely challenging:

1. The brightness contrast between the planet and its host star typically ranges from 10^{−6} for hot young giant planets emitting significant amounts of near-infrared light, to 10^{−9} for rocky planets seen exclusively through reflected light.
2. The angular separation between the planet and its host star is very small. For a planet ~10 AU from its host and tens of parsec away, the separation would be only a few tenths of an arcsec.

SPHERE is representative of a second generation of instruments devoted towards direct high-contrast imaging of exoplanets. These instruments combine extreme adaptive optics with high-efficiency coronagraphs to correct for the atmospheric turbulence at high cadence and attenuate the glare from the host star. In addition, SPHERE employs differential imaging to exploit differences between planetary and stellar light in terms of its color or polarization. Other high-contrast imaging systems that are operational include Project 1640 at the Palomar Observatory and the Gemini Planet Imager at the Gemini South Telescope. The Large Binocular Telescope, equipped with a less advanced adaptive optics system, has successfully imaged a variety of extrasolar planets.

SPHERE is targeted towards direct detection of Jupiter-sized and larger planets separated from their host stars by 5 AU or more. Detecting and characterizing a large number of such planets should offer insight into planetary migration, the hypothetical process whereby hot Jupiters, which theory indicates cannot have formed as close to their host stars as they are found, migrate inwards from where they were formed in the protoplanetary disk. It is also hypothesized that massive distant planets should be numerous; the results from SPHERE should clarify the extent to which the current observed preponderance of closely orbiting hot Jupiters represents observational bias. SPHERE observations will focus on the following types of targets:

- nearby young stellar associations which may also offer opportunities to detect low-mass planets;
- stars with known planets, in particular those with long-term residuals appearing in regression analysis of their radial velocity curves which could indicate the presence of more distant companions;
- the nearest stars, which would allow detecting targets with the smallest orbits, including those which shine only by reflected light;
- stars with ages in the 100 Myr to 1 Gyr range. In these young systems, even the smaller planets will still be hot and radiating copiously in the infrared, enabling lower detectable masses.
- SPHERE's high contrast capabilities should also enable it to be used in the study of protoplanetary discs, brown dwarfs, evolved massive stars, and to a lesser extent, in investigations of the Solar System and extragalactic targets.

Results from SPHERE complement those of detection projects that use other detection methods such as radial velocity measurements and photometric transits. These projects include HARPS, CoRoT, and the Kepler Mission.

== Instrument description ==
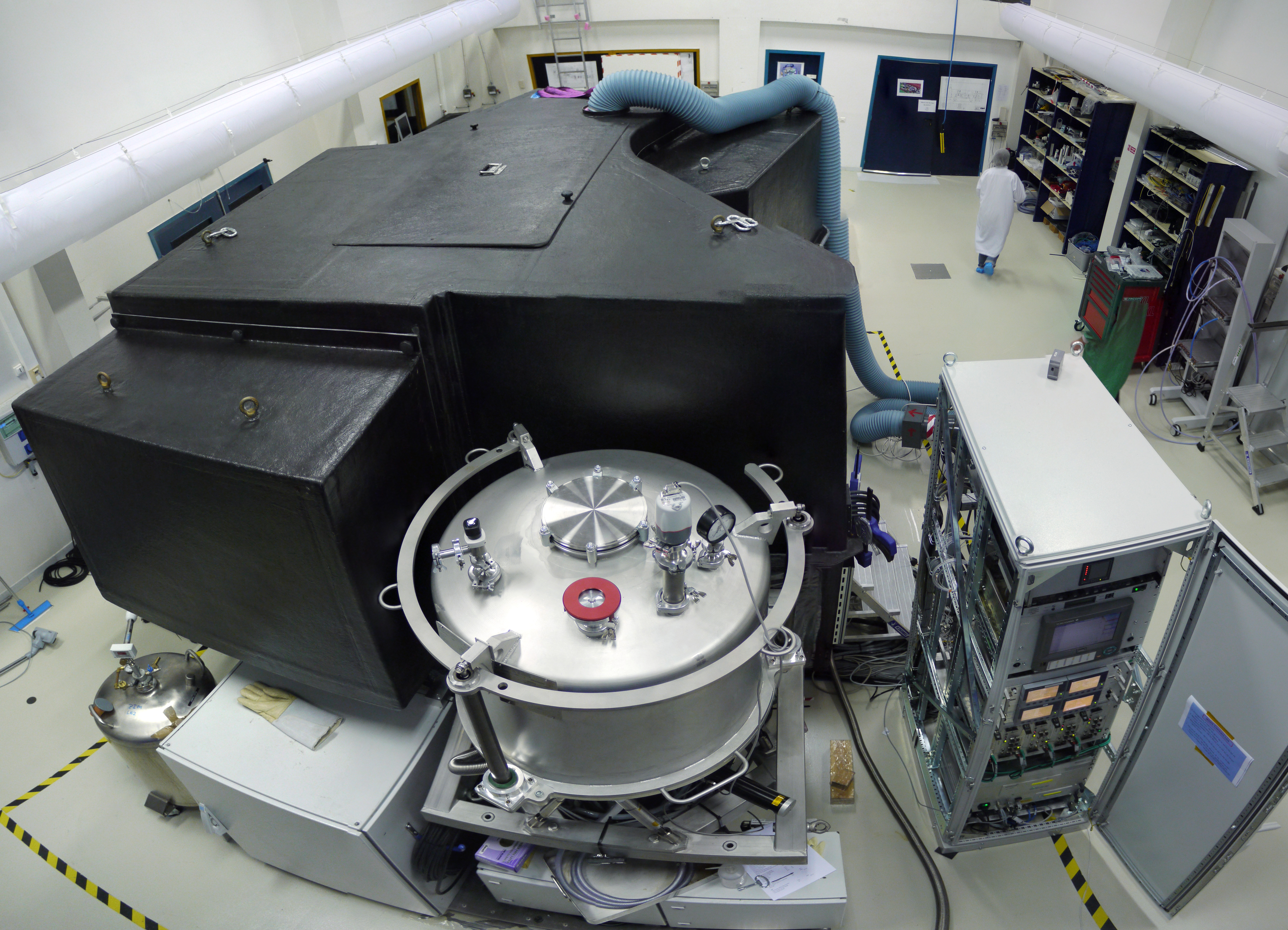
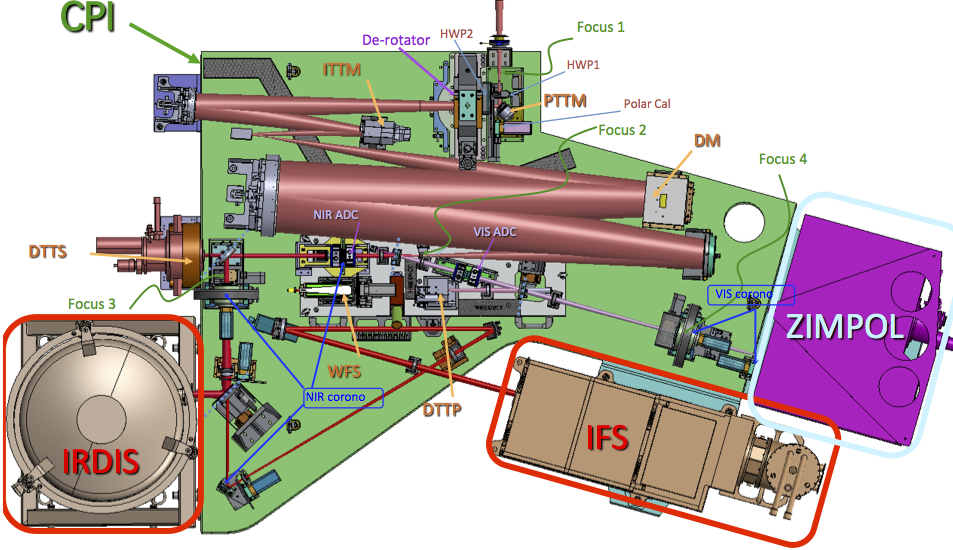
The SPHERE instrument and diagram of its subsystems

SPHERE is installed on ESO's VLT Unit Telescope 3 at the Nasmyth focus. It comprises the following subsystems:

- The Common Path and Infrastructure (CPI) is the main optical bench. It receives direct light from the telescope, and passes on stabilized, adaptive optics-corrected, and coronagraph-filtered beams to the three sub-instruments. One of its core component is the SAXO adaptive optics system that corrects for the atmospheric turbulence 1380 times per second.
- The Integral Field Spectrograph (IFS) covers a 1.73" x 1.73" field of view, translating the spectral data into a three-dimensional (x,y,λ) data cube.
- The Infrared Dual-band Imager and Spectrograph (IRDIS) has a field of view of 11" x 12.5" with a pixel scale of 12.25 mas (milliarcsecond). IRDIS can provide classical imaging. Alternatively, it can be configured to provide simultaneous dual-band imaging using two different narrow bandpass filters targeting different spectral features, or it can be configured to provide simultaneous imaging from two crossed polarizers. When operating in long slit spectroscopy mode (LSS), a coronagraphic slit replaces the coronagraph mask.
- The Zurich Imaging Polarimeter (ZIMPOL) is a high contrast imaging polarimeter operating at the visual and infrared wavelengths, capable of achieving <30 mas resolution. It is also capable of diffraction limited classical imaging.

== Science results ==
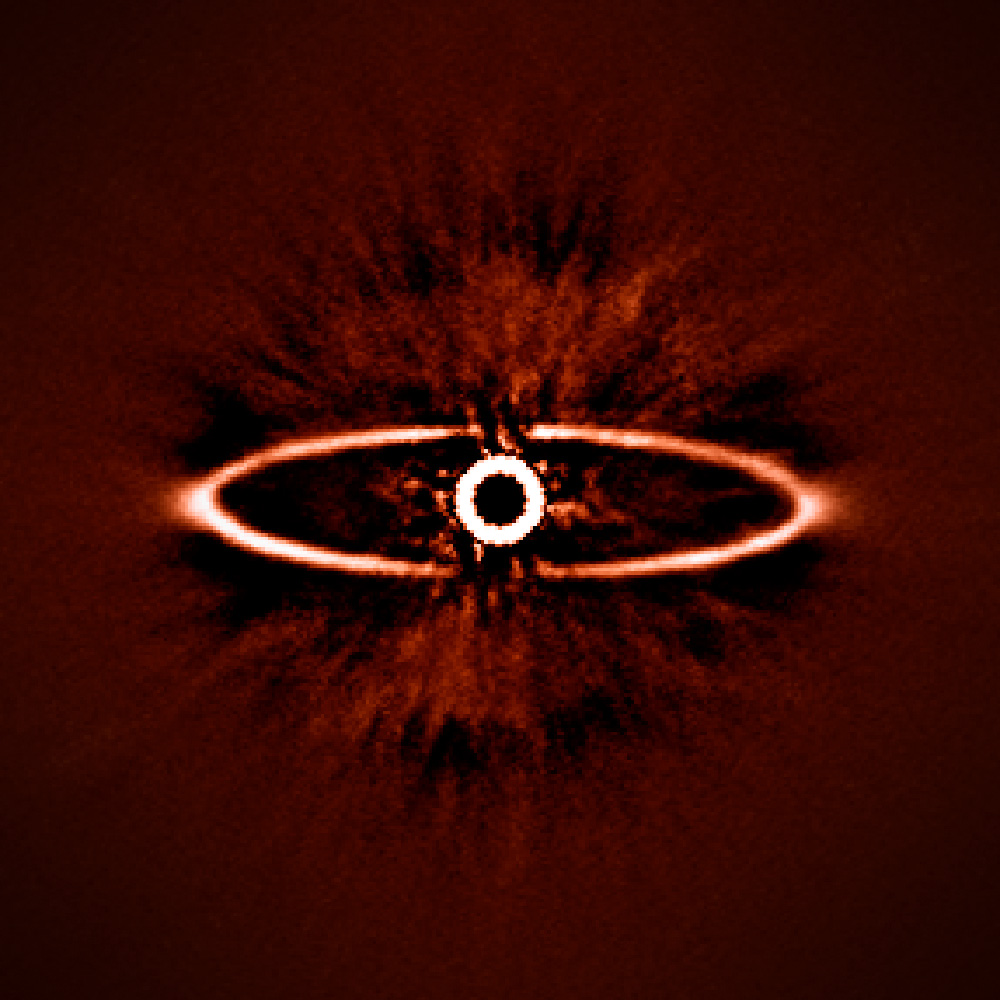
This infrared image shows the dust ring around the nearby star HR 4796A in the southern constellation of Centaurus. It was one of the first produced by the SPHERE instrument soon after it was installed on ESO's Very Large Telescope in May 2014. It shows not only the ring itself with great clarity, but also reveals the power of SPHERE to reduce the glare from the very bright star — the key to finding and studying exoplanets in future.

Early results have validated the power of the SPHERE instrument, as well as presenting results that challenge existing theory.

- SPHERE announced its first planet, HD 131399Ab, in 2016, but another study showed that this was in fact a background star. Finally, in July 2017, the SPHERE consortium announced the detection of a planet, HIP 65426 b, around HIP 65426. The planet appears to have a very dusty atmosphere filled with thick cloud, and it orbits a hot, young star that rotates surprisingly fast.
- SPHERE was used to search for a brown dwarf expected to be orbiting the eclipsing binary V471 Tauri. Careful measurements of eclipse timings had shown that they were not regular, but these irregularities could be explained by assuming that there was a brown dwarf perturbing the stars' orbits. Surprisingly, although the hypothetical brown dwarf should have been easily resolvable by SPHERE, no such companion was imaged. It would appear that the conventional explanation for the odd behavior of V471 Tauri is wrong. Several alternative explanations for the orbital timing variations have been proposed, including, for example, the possibility that the effects might be due to magnetic field variations in the primary member of the binary pair resulting in regular changes in shape of the star via the Applegate mechanism.
- Another early SPHERE result is the first image of the spiral protoplanetary disk in HD 100453. The global spiral pattern is a rare phenomena in circumstellar disks that is likely caused by the gravitational attraction of a massive body orbiting the star, such as another star or a giant planet. This disk is the first to have the perturbing companion imaged, providing a test for spiral arm generation theories. The images also reveal a gap extending from the edge of the coronagraphic mask to about the distance of Uranus' orbit in our own solar system.
- SPHERE was used to capture the first confirmed image of a newborn planet in a June 2018 publication. The young planet, PDS 70b, was seen forming in the protoplanetary disk around the star PDS 70.
- In July 2020, SPHERE directly imaged two gas giants in orbit around the star TYC 8998-760-1.

== Performance improvements ==
Several projects have been proposed to improve the performance of the SPHERE instrument:

- HiRISE (High-Resolution Imaging and Spectroscopy of Exoplanets) is already implemented as a visitor instrument since July 2023. It combines SPHERE with the upgraded CRIRES high-resolution spectrograph, using optical fibers, to improve the characterization of exoplanets detected by SPHERE.
- The SPHERE+ project aims at upgrading the SAXO adaptive optics system of SPHERE and bringing a medium-resolution IFS. The main science goals are the detection of young giant planets at closer separation from bright stars and around fainter stars and their more detailed spectral characterization. This project is currently under active development with an on-going design study.
- A more exploratory concept proposed in 2017 was the combination of SPHERE with the ESPRESSO spectrograph in the visible to attempt the detection of the Proxima Cen b planet in reflected light. This concept has been abandoned in favor of a dedicated instrument called RISTRETTO to be installed as a visitor instrument on the VLT.
