= HD 131399 =

Star in the constellation Centaurus

- SPHERE image of HD 131399 A (top left), B and C (bottom right), and the background object (center); Credit: ESO/K. Wagner et al.

Observation data Epoch J2000 Equinox ICRS
- Constellation: Centaurus
- Right ascension: 14^{h} 54^{m} 25.30919^{s}
- Declination: −34° 08′ 34.0412″
- Apparent magnitude (V): 7.07

Characteristics
- Spectral type: A1V + G + K

Astrometry
Radial velocity (R_{v})	0.30±1.3 km/s
Distance	351+15 −12 ly (107.9+4.5 −3.7 pc)

A
Proper motion (μ)	RA: −30.702 mas/yr Dec.: −30.774 mas/yr
Parallax (π)	9.7480±0.0357 mas
Distance	335 ± 1 ly (102.6 ± 0.4 pc)
Absolute magnitude (M_{V})	1.89

BC
Proper motion (μ)	RA: −31.523 mas/yr Dec.: −31.047 mas/yr
Parallax (π)	9.3021±0.0633 mas
Distance	351 ± 2 ly (107.5 ± 0.7 pc)

Orbit
Primary	A
Name	BC
Period (P)	3,556±36 yr
Semi-major axis (a)	3.56±0.03" (349±28 au)
Eccentricity (e)	0.13±0.05
Inclination (i)	45 to 65°
Longitude of the node (Ω)	265±20 (Note: There are two solutions; the other one is 75°±10°.)°
Periastron epoch (T)	B 502±33
Argument of periastron (ω) (secondary)	145.3±15 (Note: There are two solutions; the other one is 310°±10°.)°

Details
Age	21.9+4.1 −3.8 Myr

HD 131399 A
Mass	1.95+0.08 −0.06 M_{☉}
Radius	1.51+0.13 −0.10 R_{☉}
Luminosity	14.8+2.6 −2.2 L_{☉}
Surface gravity (log g)	4.37±0.10 cgs
Temperature	9,200±100 K
Rotational velocity (v sin i)	26±2 km/s

HD 131399 B
Mass	0.95±0.04 M_{☉}
Surface gravity (log g)	4.40±0.03 cgs
Temperature	4,890+190 −170 K

HD 131399 C
Mass	0.35±0.04 M_{☉}
Surface gravity (log g)	4.45±0.05 cgs
Temperature	3,460±60 K

Other designations
- CD−33°10153, HIP 72940, SAO 206071

Database references
SIMBAD	data

HD 131399 is a star system in the constellation of Centaurus. Based on the system's electromagnetic spectrum, it is located around 350 light-years (107.9 parsecs) away. The total apparent magnitude is 7.07, but because of interstellar dust between it and the Earth, it appears 0.22±0.09 magnitudes dimmer than it should.

The brightest star, is a young A-type main-sequence star, and further out are three lower-mass stars. A Jupiter-mass planet or a low-mass brown dwarf was once thought to be orbiting the central star, but this has been ruled out.

== Stellar system ==
The brightest star in the HD 131399 system is designated HD 131399 A. Its spectral type is A1V, and it is 2.08 times as massive as the Sun. The two lower-mass stars are designated HD 131399 B and C, respectively. B is a G-type main-sequence star, while HD 131399 C is a K-type main-sequence star. Both stars are less massive than the Sun. A lower-mass companion to HD 131399 A was announced in 2017, at a separation of 0.12 astronomical units (au).

HD 131399 B and C are located very close to each other, and the two orbit each other at about 10 AU. In turn, the B-C pair orbits the central star A at a distance of 349 AU. This orbit takes about 3,600 years to complete, and it has an eccentricity of about 0.13 The entire system is about 21.9 million years old.

One paper has reported that HD 131399 A has a companion in an inclined 10-day orbit with a semi-major axis of 0.1 AU. HD 131399 A has been described as a "nascent Am star"; although it has a very slow projected rotation rate and would be expected to show chemical peculiarities, its spectrum is relatively normal, possibly due to its young age.

== Claims of a planetary system ==
Artist's impression of HD 131399 Ab, before it was found to be a background star.

The claimed discovery of a massive planet, named HD 131399 Ab, was announced in a paper published in the journal Science. The object was imaged using the SPHERE imager of the Very Large Telescope at the European Southern Observatory, located in the Atacama Desert of Chile, and announced in a July 2016 paper in the journal Science. It was thought to be a T-type object with a mass of 4±1 M_{J}, but its orbit would have been unstable, causing it to be ejected between the primary's red giant phase and white dwarf phase. This was the first exoplanet candidate to be discovered by SPHERE. The image was created from two separate SPHERE observations: one to image the three stars and one to detect the faint planet. After its discovery, the team unofficially named the system "Scorpion-1" and the planet "Scorpion-1b", after the survey that prompted its discovery, the Scorpion Planet Survey (principal investigator: Daniel Apai).

In May 2017, observations made by the Gemini Planet Imager and including a reanalysis of the SPHERE data suggest that this target is, in fact, a background star. This object's spectrum seems to be like that of a K-type or M-type dwarf, not a T-type object as first thought. It also initially appeared to be associated with HD 131399, but this was because of its unusually high proper motion (in the top 4% fastest-moving stars). After subsequent data published in 2022 confirmed that the object is a background star, the paper announcing the putative discovery was retracted.
