= ZIMPOL/CHEOPS =

Scientific instrument

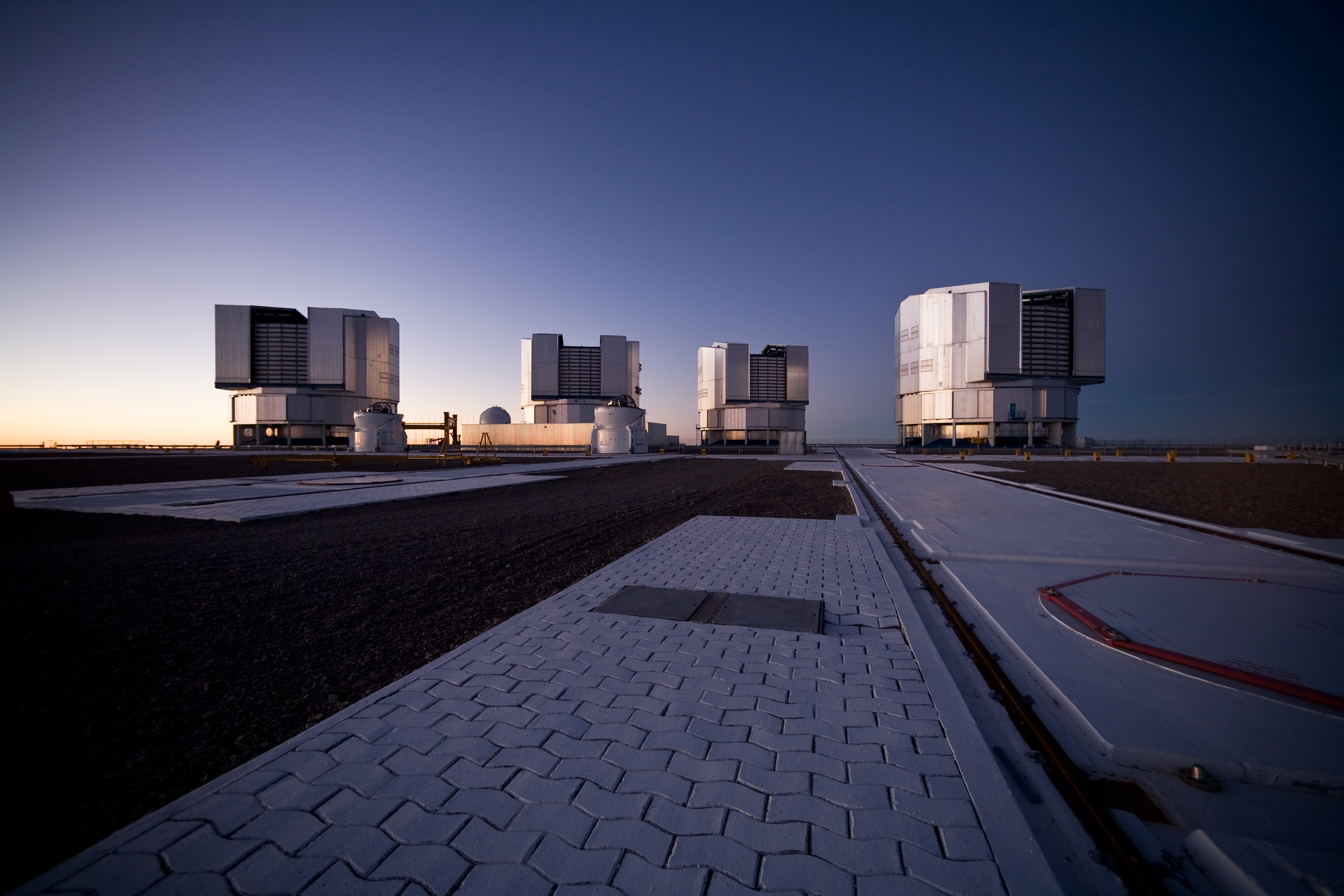
The Very Large Telescope (VLT)

ZIMPOL/CHEOPS (Zurich Imaging Polarimeter) is a polarimetric imager being developed for the Very Large Telescope for the direct detection of extra-solar planets. The imager is operated by the European Southern Observatory on Cerro Paranal in the Atacama Desert of northern Chile.

It is also the imaging polarimeter subsystem of the VLT-SPHERE instrument.

The Zurich Imaging Polarimeter (ZIMPOL) provides diffraction limited classical imaging and differential polarimetric imaging (DPI) at 15 mas (milliarcsecond) resolution in the visible spectrum and is one of three scientific subsystem integrated into the VLT-SPHERE instrument used at VLT's Unit Telescope 3, Melipal.

CHEOPS is an acronym for CHaracterizing Exo-planets by Opto-infrared Polarimetry and Spectroscopy.

== See also ==
- CHEOPS (spacecraft)
- Spectro-Polarimetric High-Contrast Exoplanet Research—(VLT-SPHERE)
