= WD 0137−349 =

Binary star system in the constellation Sculptor

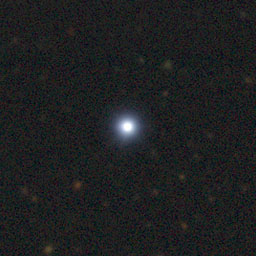
- WD 0137−349; Credit: legacy surveys

Observation data Epoch J2000 Equinox ICRS
- Constellation: Sculptor
- Right ascension: 01^{h} 39^{m} 42.847^{s}
- Declination: −34° 42′ 39.32″
- Apparent magnitude (V): +15.33 ± 0.02

Characteristics
- Spectral type: DA + L8/T
- U−B color index: −0.71
- B−V color index: −0.02

Astrometry

A
Proper motion (μ)	RA: −42.059 mas/yr Dec.: −48.895 mas/yr
Parallax (π)	9.8472±0.0367 mas
Distance	331 ± 1 ly (101.6 ± 0.4 pc)

Orbit
Period (P)	0.0803±0.0002
Semi-major axis (a)	0.65 R_{☉}
Periastron epoch (T)	HJD 2453686.5276±0.0001
Semi-amplitude (K_{1}) (primary)	27.9±0.3 km/s
Semi-amplitude (K_{2}) (secondary)	187.5±1.1 km/s

Details

WD 0137−349A
Mass	0.39±0.035 M_{☉}
Radius	0.0186±0.0012 R_{☉}
Luminosity	0.023±0.004 L_{☉}
Surface gravity (log g)	7.49±0.08 cgs
Temperature	16,500±500 K
Age	250±80 Myr

WD 0137−349B
Mass	0.053±0.006 M_{☉}
Temperature	1,300 to 1,400 K

Other designations
- 2MASS J01394284−3442393, BPS CS 29504-0036

Database references
SIMBAD	A
- B

WD 0137−349 is a binary star in the constellation of Sculptor. It is located about 330 light-years (100 parsecs) away, and appears exceedingly faint with an apparent magnitude of 15.33.

It is composed of a white dwarf with a brown dwarf in orbit around it, and is one of the few systems composed of a white dwarf and an associated brown dwarf. The brown dwarf orbits with a period of 116 minutes, or nearly 2 hours.

== Properties ==
The primary is a typical hydrogen white dwarf, as indicated by its spectral type of DA. It has about 39% of the Sun's mass and is only 1.86% as wide (12,900 km). With a high effective temperature of 16,500 K, it emits radiation mostly in the ultraviolet range.

The brown dwarf, designated WD 0137−349B, can be detected from an infrared excess. Although it glows with an effective temperature of 1300 to 1400 K, the side facing the white dwarf's intercepts 1% of its light, and heats it up to around 2000 K. The "night" side spectrum of WD 0137−349B therefore matches that of a mid-T-type brown dwarf, while the "day" side spectrum matches that of an early L-type brown dwarf. The brown dwarf is suspected to be a white dwarf or even a strange star, as a hydrogen-dominated substellar object may be unstable in such a small orbit.

== Evolution ==
The brown dwarf is known to have survived being engulfed when the primary star was a red giant, because it was relatively massive. At that time, the red giant had a radius of 100 R_{☉}. It is thought that the red giant phase of the current white dwarf was shortened from around 100 million years on average, to a few decades—while the brown dwarf was within the red giant, it hastened the expulsion of matter during this phase by rapidly heating gas and accreting a portion of it. During this phase, drag from the red giant also decreased the orbital speed of the brown dwarf, causing it to fall inwards.

The orbit of the brown dwarf is slowly decaying. In about 1.4 billion years, it is thought that the orbit of the brown dwarf will have decayed sufficiently to allow the white dwarf to draw matter away and accrete it on its surface, leading to a cataclysmic variable.

As of 2006, this is the coldest known companion to a white dwarf. This brown dwarf was also the object with the lowest mass known to have survived being engulfed by a red giant. Previously, only red dwarfs had been known to survive being enveloped during a red giant phase. It is thought that objects smaller than 20 Jupiter masses would have evaporated.

== Post common envelope white dwarf-brown dwarf binaries ==
WD 0137−349 represents the first confirmed post common envelope binary (PCEB) containing a white dwarf and a brown dwarf. As of 2018 only 8 of these wd+bd PCEBs are known. The first with a confirmed spectral type was GD 1400, but this second confirmed wd+bd binary after GD 165B was confirmed as a PCEB in 2011, five years later than WD 0137−349.
