= Post-common-envelope binary =

Binary system consisting of a white dwarf and a main sequence star or a brown dwarf

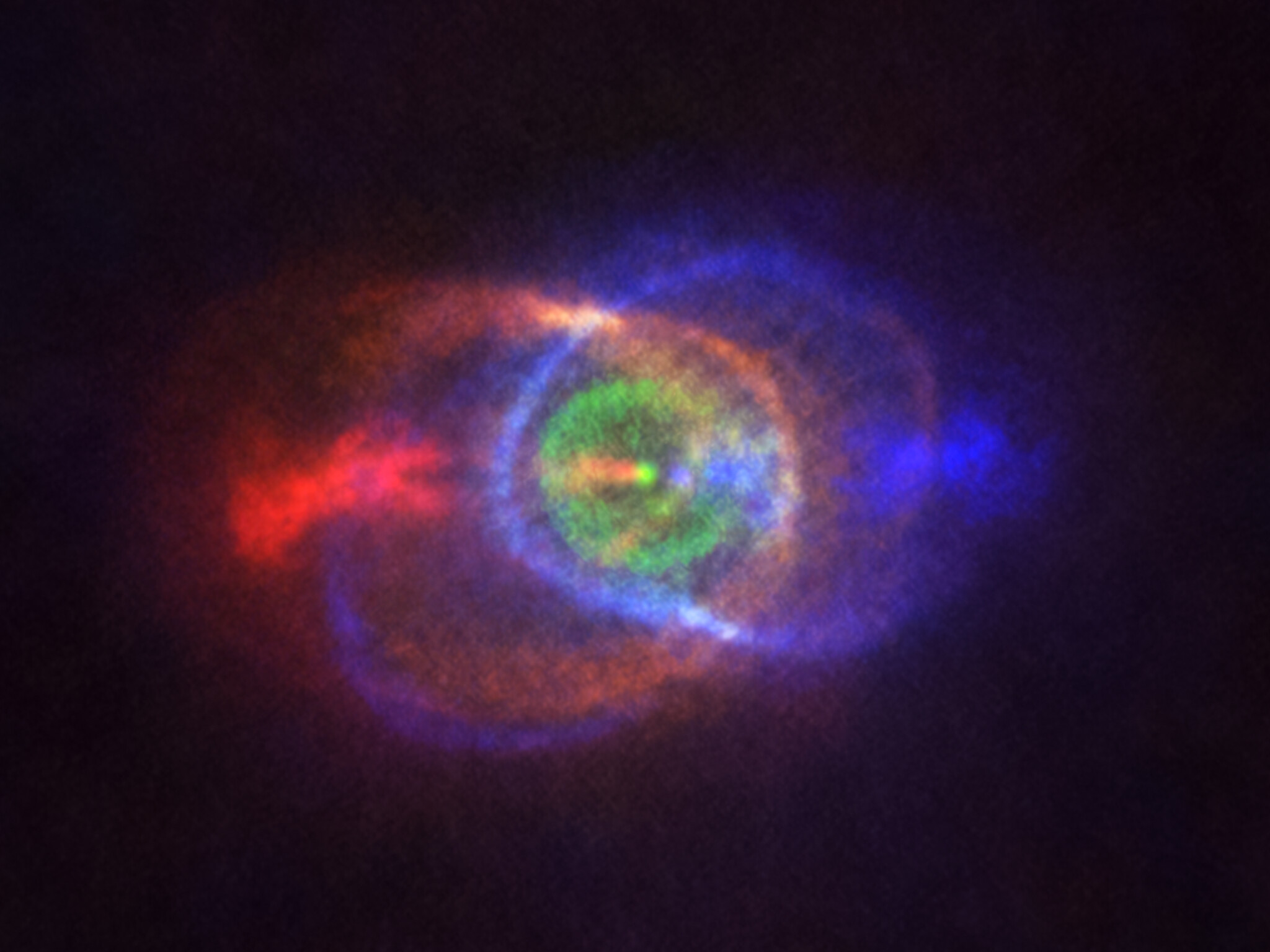
HD 101584 is a suspected post-common envelope binary. The engulfed companion triggered an outflow of gas, creating the nebula seen by ALMA.

Key stages in a common envelope phase. Top: A star fills its Roche lobe. Middle: The companion is engulfed; the core and companion spiral towards one another inside a common envelope. Bottom: The envelope is ejected and forms a PCEB or the two stars merge.

A post-common-envelope binary (PCEB) or pre-cataclysmic variable is a binary system consisting of a white dwarf or hot subdwarf and a main-sequence star or a brown dwarf. The star or brown dwarf shared a common envelope with the white dwarf progenitor in the red-giant phase. In this scenario, the star or brown dwarf loses angular momentum as it orbits within the envelope, eventually leaving a main-sequence star and white dwarf in a short-period orbit. A PCEB will continue to lose angular momentum via magnetic braking and gravitational waves and will eventually begin mass transfer, resulting in a cataclysmic variable. While there are thousands of PCEBs known, there are only a few eclipsing PCEBs, also called ePCEBs. Even more rare are PCEBs with a brown dwarf as the secondary. A brown dwarf with a mass lower than 20 M_{J} might evaporate during the common-envelope phase, so the secondary is supposed to have a mass higher than 20 M_{J}.

The material ejected from the common envelope forms a planetary nebula. One in five planetary nebulae are thought to be ejected from common envelopes, but this might be an underestimate. A planetary nebula formed by a common-envelope system usually shows a bipolar structure.

The suspected PCEB HD 101584 is surrounded by a complex nebula. During the common-envelope phase, the red-giant phase of the primary was terminated prematurely, avoiding a stellar merger. The remaining hydrogen envelope of HD 101584 was ejected during the interaction between the red giant and the companion, and it now forms the circumstellar medium around the binary.

Many eclipsing post-common-envelope binaries show variations in the timing of eclipses, the cause of which is uncertain. While orbiting exoplanets are often proposed as the causes of these variations, planetary models often fail to predict subsequent changes in eclipse timing. Other proposed causes, such as the Applegate mechanism, often cannot fully explain the observed eclipse timing variations either.

== List of post-common envelope binaries ==
Sorted by increasing orbital period.

Name	Period	Secondary	Note
SDSS J1205-0242	71.2 minutes	low-mass star or brown dwarf	shortest period PCEB (as of 2017)
WD 0137−349	116 minutes	brown dwarf	first confirmed PCEB with a brown dwarf as a companion
CSS21055	121.73 minutes	brown dwarf	eclipsing binary
SDSS 1557	2.27 hours	brown dwarf	circumbinary debris disk with a polluted white dwarf
V470 Camelopardalis (HS0705+6700)	2.3 hours	red dwarf	eclipsing binary
NY Virginis	2.4 hours	red dwarf	eclipsing binary
NSVS 14256825	2.6 hours	red dwarf	eclipsing binary
HW Virginis	2.8 hours	red dwarf	eclipsing binary
NN Serpentis	3.12 hours	red dwarf	eclipsing binary
WD 0837+185	4.2 hours	brown dwarf	extreme mass ratio of the progenitor, with the primary having a mass of 3.5-3.7 M_{☉} and the secondary 25-30 M_{J}
RR Caeli	7.3 hours	red dwarf	eclipsing binary
DE Canum Venaticorum	8.7 hours	red dwarf	eclipsing binary
central source of Hen 2-11	14.616 hours	K-type main sequence star	planetary nebula and eclipsing binary
K 1-2	16.2192 hours		planetary nebula
central source of Fleming 1	1.1953 days	white dwarf	planetary nebula
KOI-256	1.37865 days	red dwarf	eclipsing binary
central source of NGC 2392	1.9 days	hot white dwarf	planetary nebula and x-ray binary
central source of NGC 5189	4.04 days	massive white dwarf	planetary nebula; primary is a low-mass Wolf-Rayet star
G 203-47	14.91 days	red dwarf	nearest PCEB
central source of NGC 2346	16 days	>3.5 M_{☉} sub-giant	planetary nebula; one of the longest period PCEB which could host the most massive secondary
HD 101584	150–200 days	red dwarf or white dwarf	the engulfment of the companion probably triggered gas to outflow, creating the nebula, seen with Hubble and ALMA; primary is a post-RGB star

== See also ==
- Cataclysmic variable
- Second generation planet
