= Daniel Apai =

American professor and astrophysicist

- Born: January 11, 1977 (age 49); Szeged, Hungary
- Citizenship: United States of America, Hungarian
- Education: Szeged University (Diploma) / University of Heidelberg (PhD)
- Known for: extrasolar planets; astrobiology
- Awards: AAAS Fellow; Fellow of The Explorers Club
- Scientific career
- Fields: Astrophysics; Astrobiology; Atmospheric Science; Planetary Sciences; Space technology
- Workplaces: Space Telescope Science Institute; The University of Arizona
- Doctoral advisor: Thomas Henning

Daniel Apai (born 1977) is an astrophysicist at The University of Arizona in Tucson, Arizona. He is known for his studies of astrobiology, extrasolar planets, planetary atmospheres, space telescope technology, and the formation of planetary systems. He is the principal investigator of the Earths in Other Solar Systems team of NASA's Nexus for Exoplanet System Science and the Hubble Space Telescope Cloud Atlas Treasury program, and Project EDEN, a large survey for habitable planets in the immediate solar neighborhood. He is leading the Nautilus Space Observatory space telescope concept and co-leading the technology development underpinning it.

== Career ==
Daniel Apai was born in Szeged, Hungary in 1977 and grew up in Budapest, Hungary. He studied physics at the University of Szeged, Hungary and the University of Jena, Germany, and received a diploma as research physicist in 2000. After graduation, he was awarded a German Academic Exchange Service Doctoral Fellowship and began his doctoral studies at the University of Jena, under the supervision of Thomas Henning on observational studies of young stars. In 2002 he moved to the Max Planck Institute for Astronomy, Heidelberg, Germany and he received his Ph.D. from the University of Heidelberg in 2004. In 2004 he was the recipient of the Patzer Price. Between 2004 and 2008, Apai worked as a postdoctoral researcher at the Steward Observatory's NASA Astrobiology Institute node on high-contrast adaptive optics direct imaging searches for extrasolar planets. In 2008, Apai took on a position at the Space Telescope Science Institute as an assistant astronomer at the institute's Science Policy Group. In 2011, he moved back to faculty of the University of Arizona's Steward Observatory and Lunar and Planetary Laboratory, where he is full professor since 2021. He also held short-term visiting positions at The University of Texas, at the Max Planck Institute for Astronomy, Heidelberg, and at The University of Bern. Between 2022 and 2025, Apai served as Associate Dean for Research at the College of Science of the University of Arizona.

== Work ==
Apai's work includes detailed comparative studies of planet formation around sun-like stars and low-mass stars; his team has discovered that the structure and evolution of protoplanetary disks depends on stellar mass. He used, for the first time, multi-epoch near-infrared radial velocity measurements to demonstrate that many O-type stars have massive companions at the time of their formation. Apai has also used the Hubble Space Telescope and the Spitzer Space Telescope to carry out pioneering observations to map condensate clouds in brown dwarf and exoplanet atmospheres. These studies demonstrated that brown dwarfs at the L- to T spectral type transition have clouds with varying thickness, and that many brown dwarfs have zonal circulation and planetary-scale waves. Apai was also a member of the team that discovered and imaged the super-jupiter Beta Pictoris b around the star Beta Pictoris.

=== Research ===
In two papers published in 2018 and 2019, Apai, with his then-doctoral student Benjamin V. Rackham, and Mark Giampapa, provided the first systematic studies of the "transit light source effect" that leads to "stellar contamination" of exoplanet transmission spectra. These two terms were introduced in the studies to describe the impact of heterogeneous stellar photospheres on transit spectra of exoplanets. The papers correctly predicted that stellar contamination will be the limiting factor in the studies of small exoplanets with the James Webb Space Telescope. These papers inspired NASA's Pandora SmallSat, scheduled for launch in January 2026. Apai is co-investigator of Pandora and lead of its exoplanet science working group.

In 2016, Apai assembled a group of optical scientists, astrophysicists, and aerospace engineers to address a key technological challenge to scaling up astronomical space telescopes, with the goal of proposing a novel space telescope to NASA to survey a thousand extrasolar planets for atmospheric signatures of life (biosignatures). This effort led to the successful development of a new optical technology, Multi-Order Diffractive Engineered Material (MODE) lenses, that combine refraction with diffraction to form high-quality images with an ultra-light optical element that can be cost-effectively fabricated. By replacing expensive and technologically challenging primary mirrors, the MODE technology has the potential to enable production of low-cost but large-aperture space telescopes. In an Astronomical Journal paper published in 2019, Apai and his team described a large and relatively low-cost array of identical unit telescopes that combines light incoherently, providing a light-collecting area equivalent of a single 50 m-diameter telescope. This concept is named the Nautilus Space Observatory (aka Nautilus Deep Space Observatory). With a light-collecting area about 100 times greater than that of the James Webb Space Telescope and ten times greater than that of the LUVOIR space telescope concept, Nautilus Deep Space Observatory is designed to survey extrasolar planets for biosignatures in a 10–100 times larger sample than other space telescope concepts yet envisioned. The first such unit space telescope, with a notional 8.5m-diameter lens, was proposed as the Nautilus Probe to the Astronomy 2020 Decadal Survey.

== Publications and Books ==
Apai is an author of over 400 professional publications, including over 230 refereed papers. He co-edited (with Dante Lauretta) the book Protoplanetary Dust, published by Cambridge University Press.

== Honours ==
In 2024, Apai was elected Fellow of the American Association for the Advancement of Science "For distinguished contributions to the field of astrobiology and astrophysics, particularly for advancements in our understanding of habitable exoplanets and planetary systems." Apai is also a Fellow of The Explorers Club.

== See also ==
- Nautilus Deep Space Observatory
