= Exoplanetary Circumstellar Environments and Disk Explorer =

Planned space telescope

- Mission type: Space observatory
- Website: soweb.as.arizona.edu/~gschneider/EXCEDE_OVERVIEW.html
- Mission duration: 3 years nominal (proposed)

Orbital parameters
- Reference system: Geocentric
- Regime: Sun Synchronous
- Semi-major axis: 2,000 km
- Inclination: 105°
- Period: 127 min

Main telescope
- Diameter: 70 cm (28 in)

Instruments
- Imaging polarimeter

Exoplanetary Circumstellar Environments and Disk Explorer (EXCEDE) is a proposed space telescope for NASA's Explorer program to observe circumstellar protoplanetary and debris discs and study planet formation around nearby (within 100 parsecs) stars of spectral classes M to B. Had it been selected for development, it was proposed to launch in 2019.

The spacecraft concept proposed to use a 70 centimeter diameter telescope-mounted coronagraph called PIAA (Phase Induced Amplitude Apodized Coronagraph) to suppress starlight in order to be able to detect fainter radiation of circumstellar dust. Characterizing constitution of such disks would provide clues for planetary formation (mostly in habitable zones), while already existing exoplanets can be detected through their interaction with dust disk. The project's Principal Investigator is Glenn Schneider.

== Science goals ==
The science goals of the concept mission are:

- Explore the amount of dust in habitable zones.
- Determining if such a disk interferes with future planet finding missions (dust-scattered starlight causes noise in images of exoplanets).
- Determine composition of material delivered to planets: icy and organic molecule-rich particles are important for life.
- Determine fraction of massive planets on large orbits.
- Observe how protoplanetary disks make Solar System-like architectures.
- Constrain giant planets' composition by measuring their reflectivity. EXCEDE would be the first to image (giant) exoplanets distances from their stars similar to ours (0.5-7 AU).
