= Project 1640 =

Astronomical imaging project at Palomar Observatory

Project 1640 is a high contrast imaging project at Palomar Observatory. It seeks to image brown dwarfs and Jupiter-sized planets around nearby stars. Rebecca Oppenheimer, associate curator and chair of the Astrophysics Department at the American Museum of Natural History, is the principal investigator for the project.

== Instruments ==
The two main instruments behind Project 1640 is an Integral field spectrograph (IFS) and an Apodized-pupil Lyot coronagraph at the Hale Telescope at Palomar. This instrument is the basis of a high-contrast imaging long-term observational program. The instrument uses the chromatic nature of the speckle noise to distinguish it from any true astrophysical companions, including software which increases sensitivity by 10-20 times. Such sensitivity can detect planets of several Jupiter masses. The spectrograph obtains 23 images across the J and H bands (1.06-1.78 μm), with a spectral resolution of 45. In approximately 2013, a Post-coronagraph Wave Front Calibration System was added. Its goal is to achieve a wave front irregularity of less than 10 nm.

== Preliminary results ==
On March 10, 2013, Project 1640 made its first remote imaging of another solar system. It imaged four red exoplanets orbiting the star HR8799, 128 light years away from Earth, determining the spectra for all four. One significant result was the detection of a chemical abnormality. At normal temperatures, such as those surrounding the four exoplanets, ammonia and methane should both be present in significant amounts. However, the exoplanets have either ammonia or methane in abundance, while the other chemical is missing. Other chemicals such as acetylene (not previously detected on any exoplanet) may also be present. There is also a significant cloud cover on the planets.
