= Applegate mechanism =

Stellar phenomenon

The Applegate mechanism (Applegate's mechanism or Applegate effect) explains long term orbital period variations seen in certain eclipsing binaries. As a main sequence star goes through an activity cycle, the outer layers of the star are subject to a magnetic torque changing the distribution of angular momentum, resulting in a change in the star's oblateness. The orbit of the stars in the binary pair is gravitationally coupled to their shape changes, so that the period shows modulations (typically on the order of ∆P/P ~ 10^{−6}) on the same time scale as the activity cycles (typically on the order of decades).

== Introduction ==
Careful timing of eclipsing binaries has shown that systems showing orbital period modulations on the order of ∆P/P ~ 10^{−5} over a period of decades are quite common. A striking example of such a system is Algol, for which the detailed observational record extends back over two centuries. Over this span of time, a graph of the time dependence of the difference between the observed times of eclipses versus the predicted times shows a feature (termed the "great inequality") with a full amplitude of 0.3 days and a recurrent time scale of centuries. Superimposed on this feature is a secondary modulation with a full amplitude of 0.06 days and a recurrent time scale of about 30 years. Orbital period modulations of similar amplitude are seen in other Algol binaries as well.

Although recurrent, these period modulations do not follow a strictly regular cycle. Irregular recurrence rules out attempts to explain these period modulations as being due to apsidal precession or the presence of distant, unseen companions. Apsidal precession explanations also have the problem that they require an eccentric orbit, but the systems in which these modulations are observed often show orbits of little eccentricity. Furthermore, third body explanations have the issue that in many cases, a third body massive enough to produce the observed modulation should not have managed to escape optical detection, unless the third body were quite exotic.

Another phenomenon observed in certain Algol binaries has been monotonic period increases. This is quite distinct from the far more common observations of alternating period increases and decreases explained by the Applegate mechanism. Monotonic period increases have been attributed to mass transfer, usually (but not always) from the less massive to the more massive star.

== Mechanism ==
The time scale and recurrence patterns of these orbital period modulations suggested to Matese and Whitmire (1983) a mechanism invoking changes in the quadrupole moment of one star with subsequent spin-orbit coupling. However, they could not provide any convincing explanation for what might cause such fluctuations in the quadrupole moment.

Taking the Matese and Whitmire mechanism as a basis, Applegate argued that changes in the radius of gyration of one star could be related to magnetic activity cycles. Supportive evidence for his hypothesis came from the observation that a large fraction of the late-type secondary stars of Algol binaries appear to be rapidly rotating convective stars, implying that they should be chromospherically active. Indeed, orbital period modulations are seen only in Algol-type binaries containing a late-type convective star.

Given that gravitational quadrupole coupling is involved in producing orbital period changes, the question remained of how a magnetic field could induce such shape changes. Most models of the 1980s assumed that the magnetic field would deform the star by distorting it away from hydrostatic equilibrium. Marsh and Pringle (1990) demonstrated, however, that the energy required to produce such deformations would exceed the total energy output of the star.

A star does not rotate as a solid body. The outer parts of a star contribute most to a star's quadrupole moment. Applegate proposed that as a star goes through its activity cycle, magnetic torques could cause a redistribution of angular momentum within a star. As a result, the rotational oblateness of the star will change, and this change would ultimately result in changing the orbital period via the Matese and Whitmire mechanism. Energy budget calculations indicate that the active star typically should be variable at the ΔL/L ≈ 0.1 level and should be differentially rotating at the ΔΩ/Ω ≈ 0.01 level.

== Applicability ==
The Applegate mechanism makes several testable predictions:

- Luminosity variations in the active star should correspond to modulations in the orbital period.
- Any other indicator of magnetic activity (i.e. sunspot activity, coronal X-ray luminosity, etc.) should also show variations corresponding to modulations in the orbital period.
- Since large changes in the radius of the star are ruled out by considerations of energetics, luminosity variations should be entirely due to temperature variations.

Tests of the above predictions have been supportive of the mechanism's validity, but not unambiguously so.

The Applegate effect provides a unified explanation for many (but not all) ephemeris curves for a wide class of binaries, and it may aid in the understanding of the dynamo activity seen in rapidly rotating stars.

The Applegate mechanism has also been invoked to explain variations in the observed transit times of extrasolar planets, in addition to other possible effects such as tidal dissipation and the presence of other planetary bodies.

However, there are many stars for which the Applegate mechanism is inadequate. For example, the orbital period variations in certain eclipsing post-common-envelope binaries are an order of magnitude larger than can be accommodated by the Applegate effect, with magnetic braking or a third body in a highly elliptical orbit providing the only known mechanisms able to explain the observed variation.
