= International X-ray Observatory =

Cancelled NASA-ESA-JAXA space telescope project

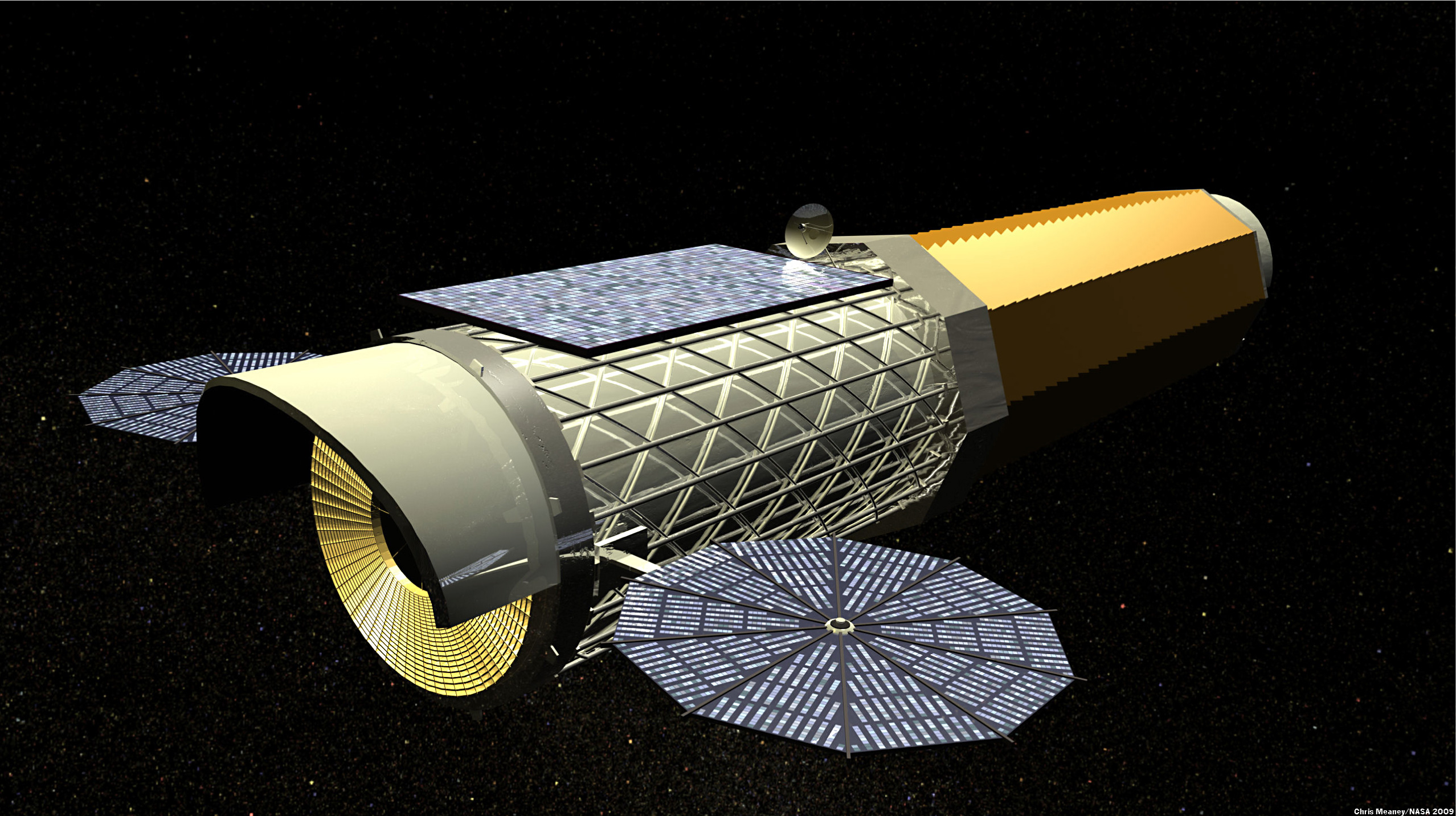
- International X-ray Observatory
- Names: IXO
- Mission type: Space telescope
- Operator: NASA / ESA / JAXA
- Website: https://ixo.gsfc.nasa.gov/
- Mission duration: 5 years (planned); 10 years (possible)

Spacecraft properties
- Launch mass: 4,375 kg (9,645 lb)
- Power: 3.7 kW

Start of mission
- Launch date: 2021 (cancelled)
- Rocket: Atlas V or Ariane 5
- Launch site: Cape Canaveral or Guiana Space Centre
- Contractor: United Launch Alliance or Arianespace

Orbital parameters
- Reference system: L_{2} point
- Regime: 800 km

Main telescope
- Type: X-ray
- Focal length: 20 metres

Instruments
- Hard X-ray Imager (HXI); High Timing Resolution Spectrometer (HTRS); X-ray Grating Spectrometer (XGS); X-ray Microcalomiter Spectrometer (XMS); X-ray Polarimeter (XPOL)

The International X-ray Observatory (IXO) was a cancelled X-ray telescope that was to be launched in 2021 as a joint effort by NASA, the European Space Agency (ESA), and the Japan Aerospace Exploration Agency (JAXA). In May 2008, ESA and NASA established a coordination group involving all three agencies, with the intent of exploring a joint mission merging the ongoing XEUS and Constellation-X Observatory (Con-X) projects. This proposed the start of a joint study for IXO. NASA was forced to cancel the observatory due to budget constraints in fiscal year 2012. ESA, however, decided to reboot the mission on its own developing Advanced Telescope for High Energy Astrophysics as a part of Cosmic Vision program.

== Science with IXO ==
X-ray observations are crucial for understanding the structure and evolution of the stars, galaxies, and the Universe as a whole. X-ray images reveal hot spots in the Universe – regions where particles have been energized or raised to very high temperatures by strong magnetic fields, violent explosions, and intense gravitational forces. X-ray sources in the sky are also associated with the different phases of stellar evolution such as the supernova remnants, neutron stars, and black holes.

IXO would have explored X-ray Universe and address the following fundamental and timely questions in astrophysics:

- What happens close to a black hole?
- How did supermassive black holes grow?
- How do large scale structures form?
- What is the connection between these processes?

To address these science questions, IXO would have traced orbits close to the event horizon of black holes, measure black hole spin for several hundred active galactic nucleus (AGN), use spectroscopy to characterize outflows and the environment of AGN during their peak activity, search for supermassive black holes out to redshift z = 10, map bulk motions and turbulence in galaxy clusters, find the missing baryons in the cosmic web using background quasars, and observe the process of cosmic feedback where black holes inject energy on galactic and intergalactic scales.

This will allow astronomers to understand better the history and evolution of matter and energy, visible and dark matter, as well as their interplay during the formation of the largest structures.

Closer to home, IXO observations would have constrained the equation of state in neutron stars, black holes spin demographics, when and how elements were created and dispersed into the Outer space, and much more.

To achieve these science goals, IXO requires extremely large collecting area combined with good angular resolution in order to offer unmatched sensitivities for the study of the high-z Universe and for high-precision spectroscopy of bright X-ray sources.

The large collecting area required because, in astronomy, telescopes gather light and produce images by hunting and counting photons. The number of photons collected puts the limit to our knowledge about the size, energy, or mass of an object detected. More photons collected means better images and better spectra, and therefore offers better possibilities for understanding of cosmic processes.

== IXO configuration ==
The heart of IXO mission was a single large X-ray mirror with up to 3 square meters of collecting area and 5 arcsec angular resolution, which is achieved with an extendable optical bench with a 20 m focal length.

== Optics ==
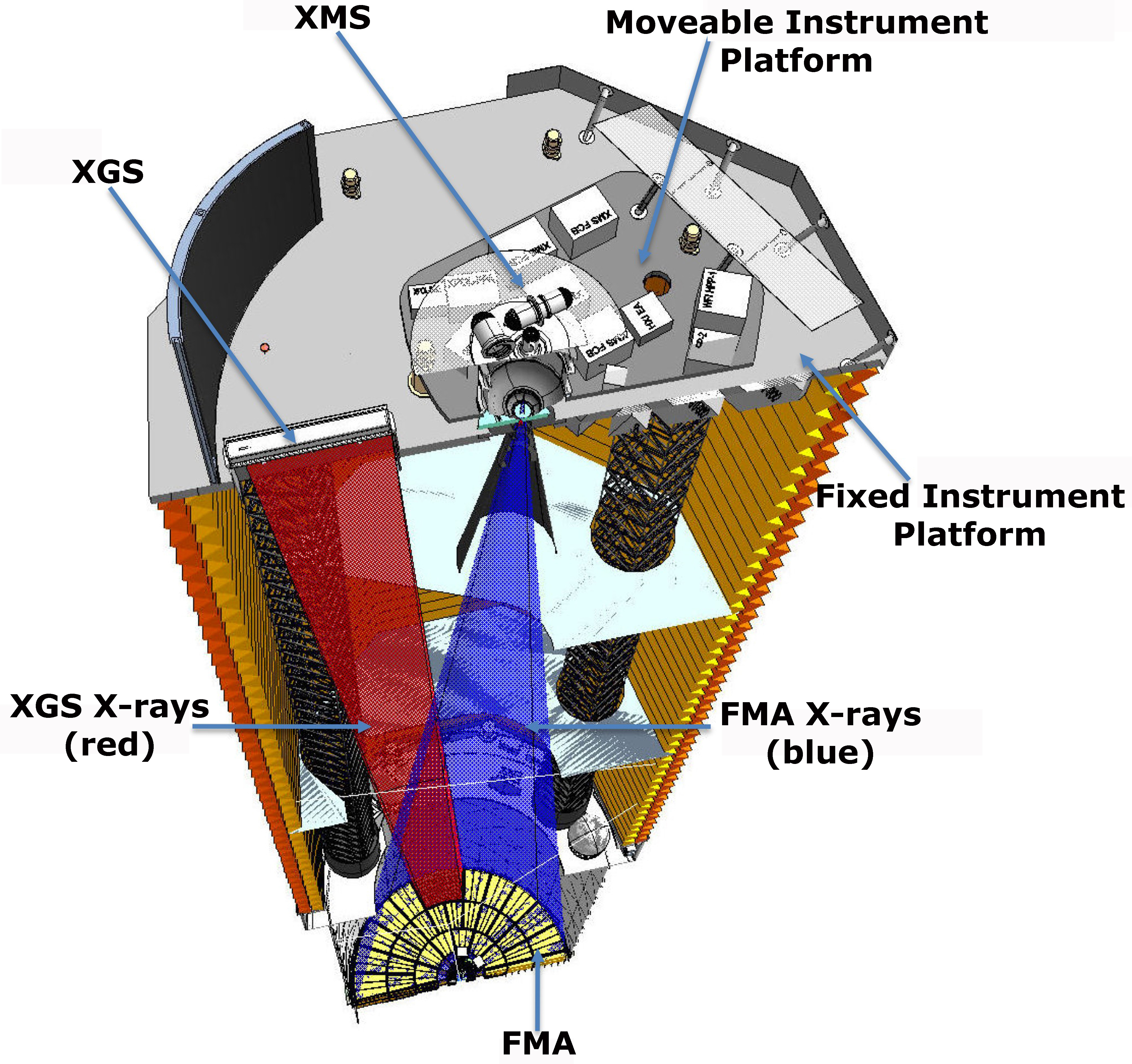
IXO – cutaway view. X-ray beams reaching detectors, which will provide complementary spectroscopy, imaging, timing, and polarimetry data on cosmic X-ray sources.

A key feature of the IXO mirror design is a single mirror assembly (Flight Mirror Assembly, FMA), which is optimized to minimize mass while maximizing the collecting area, and an extendible optical bench.

Unlike visible light, X-rays cannot be focused at normal incidence, since the X-ray beams would be absorbed in the mirror. Instead, IXO's mirrors, like all prior X-ray telescopes, will use grazing incidences, scattering at a very shallow angle. As a result, X-ray telescopes consist of nested cylindrical shells, with their inner surface being the reflecting surface. However, as the goal is to collect as many photons as possible, IXO will have a bigger than 3 m diameter mirror.

As the grazing angle is a function inversely proportional to photon energy, the higher-energy X-rays require smaller (less than 2°) grazing angles to be focused. This implies longer focal lengths as the photon energy increases, thus making X-ray telescopes difficult to build if focusing of photons with energies higher than a few keV is desired. For that reason IXO features an extendible optical bench that offers a focal length of 20 m. A focal length of 20 meters was selected for IXO as a reasonable balance between scientific needs for advanced photon collecting capability at the higher energy ranges and engineering constraints. Since no payload fairing is large enough to fit a 20-meter long observatory, thus IXO has a deployable metering structure between the spacecraft bus and the instrument module.

== Instruments ==
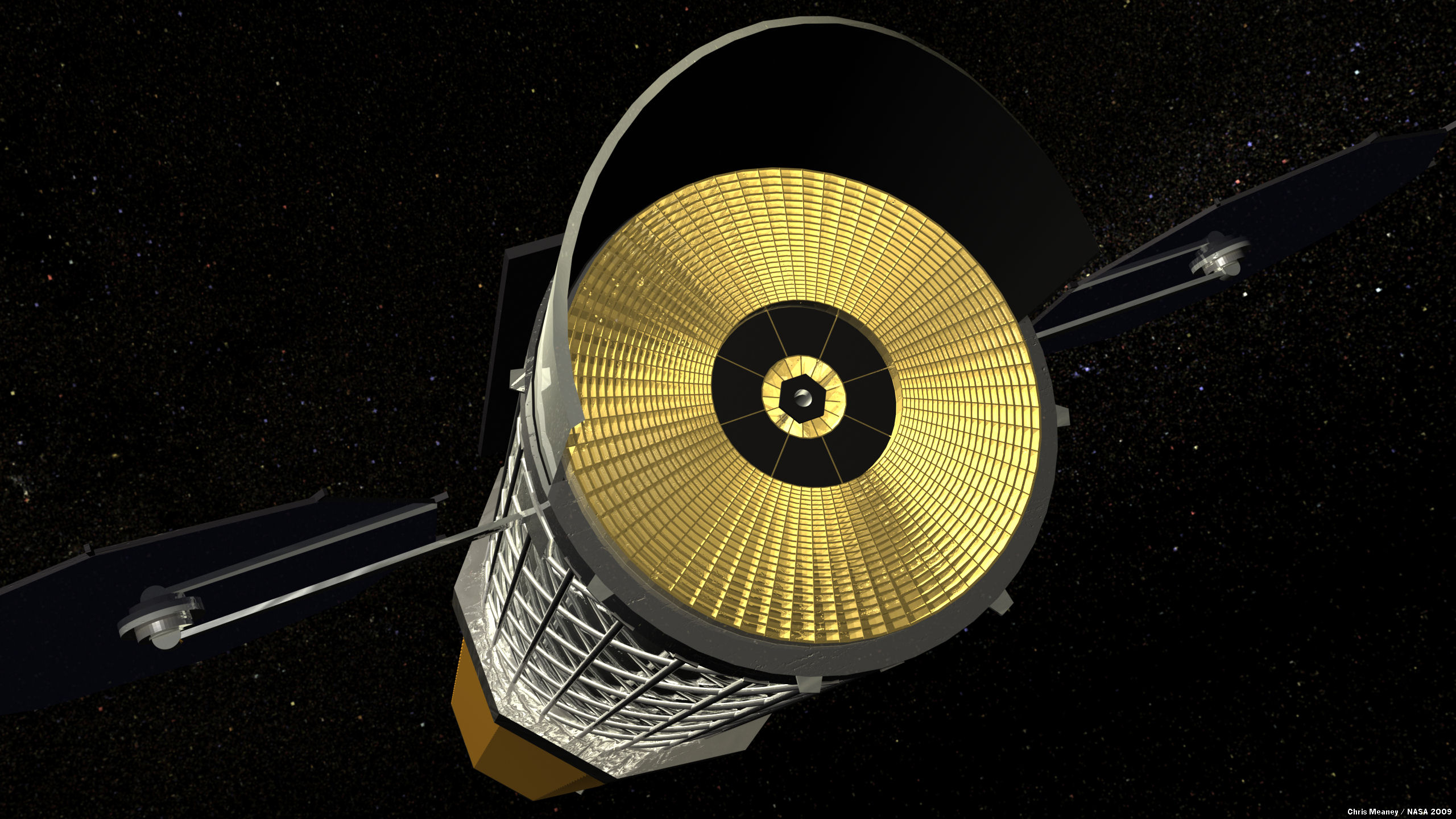
NASA conception of IXO, mirror view, artist's impression.

IXO scientific goals require gathering many pieces of information using different techniques such as spectroscopy, timing, imaging, and polarimetry. Therefore, IXO would have carried a range of detectors, which would have provided complementary spectroscopy, imaging, timing, and polarimetry data on cosmic X-ray sources to help disentangle the physical processes occurring in them.

Two high-resolution spectrometers, a microcalorimeter (XMS or cryogenic imaging spectrograph (CIS) and a set of dispersive gratings (XGS) would have provided high-quality spectra over the 0.1–10 keV bandpass where most astrophysical abundant ions have X-ray lines.

The detailed spectroscopy from these instruments would have enabled high-energy astronomers to learn about the temperature, composition, and velocity of plasmas in the Universe. Moreover, the study of specific X-ray spectral features probes the conditions of matter in extreme gravity field, such as around supermassive black holes. Flux variability adds a further dimension by linking the emission to the size of the emitting region and its evolution over time; the high timing resolution spectrometer (HTRS) on IXO would have allowed these types of studies in a broad energy range and with high sensitivity.

The Wide Field Imaging and Hard X-ray Imaging detectors (WFI/HXI) together imaged the sky up to 18 arcmin field of view (FOV) with a moderate resolution (<150 eV up to 6 keV and <1 keV (FWHM) at 40 keV).

IXO's imaging X-ray polarimeter would have been a powerful tool to explore sources such as neutron stars and black holes, measuring their properties and how they impact their surroundings.

The detectors would have been located on two instrument platforms—the Moveable Instrument Platform (MIP) and the Fixed Instrument Platform (FIP). The Moveable Instrument Platform is needed because an X-ray telescopes cannot be folded as it can be done with visible-spectrum telescopes. Therefore, IXO would have used the MIP that holds the following detectors – a wide field imaging and hard X-ray imaging detector, a high-spectral-resolution imaging spectrometer, a high timing resolution spectrometer, and a polarimeter – and rotates them into the focus in turn.

The X-ray Grating Spectrometer would have been located on the Fixed Instrument Platform. This is a wavelength-dispersive spectrometer that would have provided high spectral resolution in the soft X-ray band. It can be used to determine the properties of the warm-hot-intergalactic medium, outflows from active galactic nuclei, and plasma emissions from stellar coronae.

A fraction of the beam from the mirror would have been dispersed to a charge-coupled device (CCD) camera, which would have operated simultaneously with the observing MIP instrument and collect instrumental background data, which can occur when an instrument is not in the focal position. To avoid interfering the very faint astronomical signals with radiation from the telescope, the telescope itself and all its instruments must be kept cold. Therefore, the IXO Instrument Platform would have featured a large shield that blocks the light from the Sun, Earth, and Moon, which otherwise would heat up the telescope, and interfere with the observations.

IXO optics and instrumentation will provide up to 100-fold increase in effective area for high resolution spectroscopy, deep spectral, and microsecond spectroscopic timing with high count rate capability. The improvement of IXO relative to current X-ray missions is equivalent to a transition from the 200-inch Palomar telescope to a 22 m telescope while at the same time shifting from spectral band imaging to an integral field spectrograph.

== Launch ==
The planned launch date for IXO was 2021, going into an L2 orbit on either the Ariane V or Atlas V.

== Science operations ==
IXO was designed to operate for a minimum of 5 years, with a goal of 10 years, so IXO science operations were anticipated to last from 2021 to 2030.

== See also ==
- Advanced Telescope for High Energy Astrophysics
- Arcus
- Beyond Einstein program
- Chandra X-ray Observatory
- Constellation-X Observatory
- Great Observatories program
- Laser Interferometer Space Antenna
- Lynx X-ray Observatory
- XEUS
