= Beyond Einstein program =

NASA project

The Beyond Einstein program is a NASA project designed to explore the limits of General theory of Relativity of Albert Einstein. The project includes two space observatories, and several observational cosmology probes. The program culminates with the Einstein Vision probes, after completion of the Great Observatories program.

Constellation-X Observatory (Con-X) and the Laser Interferometer Space Antenna (LISA) have been promoted by NASA as the Einstein Great Observatories, to differentiate them from the current generation. However, they are not a part of the Great Observatories program.

== Program missions ==
=== Einstein Great Observatories ===
- Constellation-X (Con-X) (cancelled - Merged with International X-ray Observatory (IXO)): the next-generation X-ray space observatory
- Laser Interferometer Space Antenna LISA (LISA Pathfinder in 2015): a gravitational wave space observatory. The NASA component of this mission was terminated in 2011; within the European Space Agency's Cosmic Vision program, an evolved LISA has been chosen to proceed with a tentative launch date in 2034.

=== Einstein Probes ===
- Inflation Probe: designed to examine the cosmic microwave background (CMB) polarization; a follow-up to Cosmic Background Explorer (COBE) and Wilkinson Microwave Anisotropy Probe (WMAP)
- Black-Hole Finder Probe (BHFP): a complement to Constellation-X Observatory (HTXS)
- Dark Energy Probe: the Joint Dark Energy Mission (JDEM) was studied extensively in three different implementations:
  - Supernova/Acceleration Probe (SNAP) - no longer under study. Superseded by the Wide Field Infrared Survey Telescope (Nancy Grace Roman Space Telescope)
  - Dark Energy Space Telescope (Destiny) - no longer under study. Superseded by the Wide Field Infrared Survey Telescope (Nancy Grace Roman Space Telescope)
  - Advanced Dark Energy Physics Telescope (ADEPT) - no longer under study. Superseded by the Wide Field Infrared Survey Telescope (Nancy Grace Roman Space Telescope)

The science of the Dark Energy Probe was folded into the Nancy Grace Roman Space Telescope (WFIRST) mission upon recommendation by a National Research Council committee in 2010.

=== Einstein Vision missions ===
- Big Bang Observer, a follow-up mission to LISA and Inflation Probe, also a gravitational-wave observatory
- Black-Hole Imager (MAXIM): an X-ray observation of infalling gas at the event horizon of a black hole; a follow-up to HTXS and BHFP

== See also ==
- Great Observatories program
