= Great Observatories program =

Series of NASA satellites

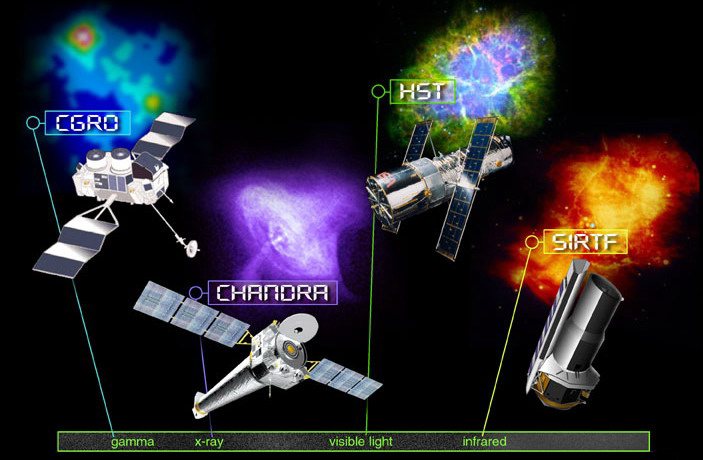
Four Great Observatories

NASA's series of Great Observatories satellites are four large, powerful space-based astronomical telescopes launched between 1990 and 2003. They were built with different technology to examine specific wavelength/energy regions of the electromagnetic spectrum: gamma rays, X-rays, visible and ultraviolet light, and infrared light.

The Hubble Space Telescope (HST) primarily observes visible light and near-ultraviolet. It was launched in 1990 aboard the Space Shuttle Discovery during STS-31, but its main mirror had been ground incorrectly, resulting in spherical aberration that compromised the telescope's capabilities. The optics were corrected to their intended quality by the STS-61 servicing mission in 1993. In 1997, the STS-82 servicing mission added capability in the near-infrared range, and in 2009 the STS-125 servicing mission refurbished the telescope and extended its projected service life. It remains in active operation as of April 2026.

The Compton Gamma Ray Observatory (CGRO) primarily observed gamma rays, though it extended into hard x-rays as well. It was launched in 1991 aboard Atlantis during STS-37. It was de-orbited in 2000 after a gyroscope failed.

The Chandra X-ray Observatory (CXO) primarily observes soft X-rays. It was launched in 1999 aboard Columbia during STS-93 into an elliptical high-Earth orbit, and was initially named the Advanced X-ray Astronomical Facility (AXAF). It remains in active operation as of April 2026.

The Spitzer Space Telescope (SST) observed the infrared spectrum. It was launched in 2003 aboard a Delta II rocket into an Earth-trailing solar orbit. Depletion of its liquid helium coolant in 2009 reduced its functionality, leaving it with only two short-wavelength imaging modules. It was removed from service and placed into safe-mode on January 30, 2020.

== Origins of the Great Observatory program ==
The concept of a Great Observatory program was first proposed in the 1979 NRC report "A Strategy for Space Astronomy and Astrophysics for the 1980s". This report laid the essential groundwork for the Great Observatories and was chaired by Peter Meyer (through June 1977) and then by Harlan J. Smith (through publication). In the mid-1980s, it was further advanced by all of the astrophysics Division Directors at NASA headquarters, including Frank Martin and Charlie Pellerin. NASA's "Great Observatories" program used four separate satellites, each designed to cover a different part of the spectrum in ways which terrestrial systems could not. This perspective enabled the proposed X-ray and InfraRed observatories to be appropriately seen as a continuation of the astronomical program begun with Hubble and CGRO rather than competitors or replacements. Two explanatory documents published by NASA and created for the NASA Astrophysics Division and the NASA Astrophysics Management Working Group laid out the rationale for the suite of observatories and questions that could be addressed across the spectrum. They had an important role in the campaign to win and sustain approval for the four telescopes.

== Great Observatories ==
=== Hubble Space Telescope ===
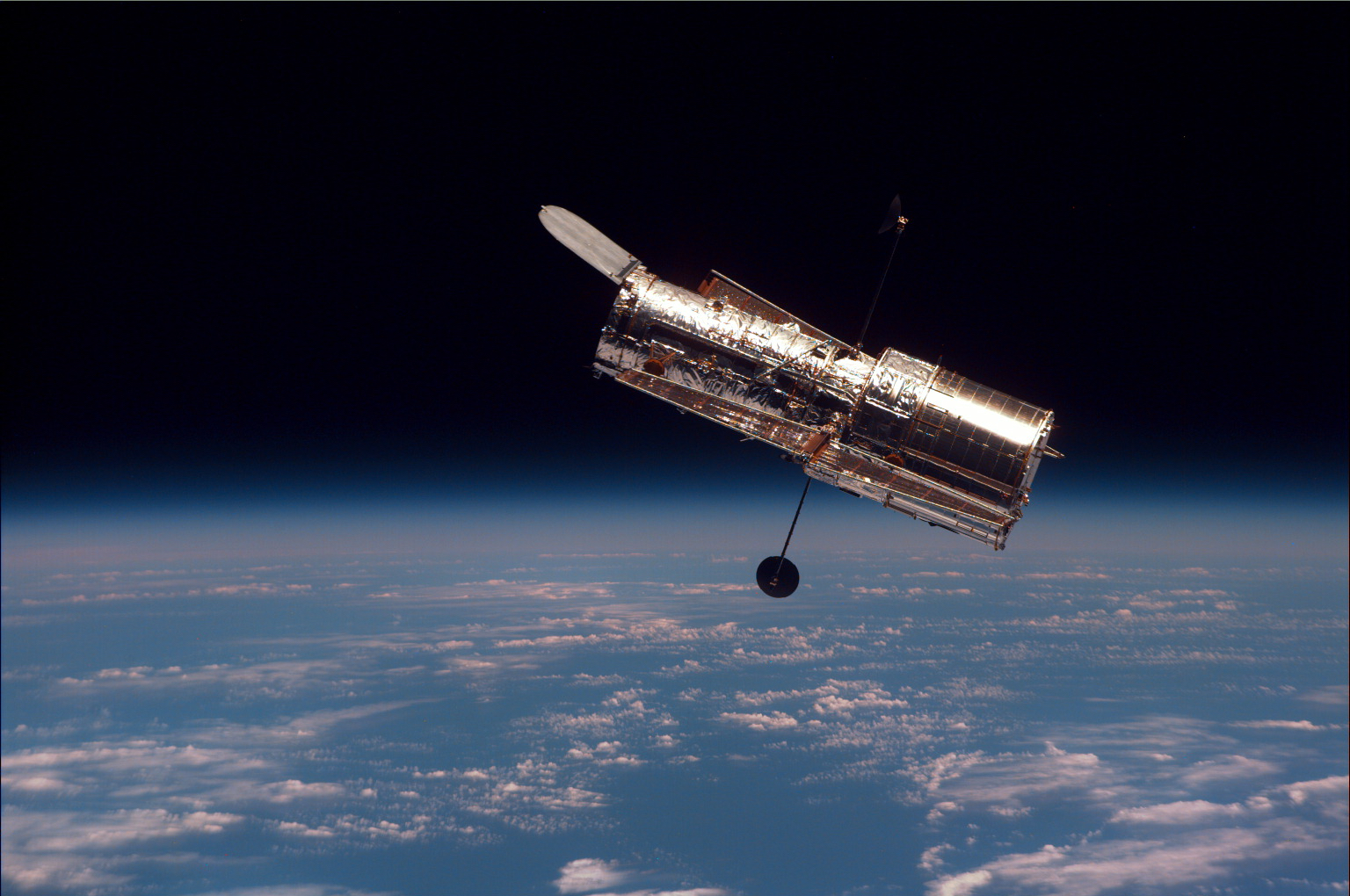
Hubble Space Telescope

The history of the Hubble Space Telescope can be traced back to 1946, when the astronomer Lyman Spitzer wrote the paper Astronomical advantages of an extraterrestrial observatory. Spitzer devoted much of his career to pushing for a space telescope.

The 1966–1972 Orbiting Astronomical Observatory missions demonstrated the important role space-based observations could play in astronomy. In 1968, NASA developed firm plans for a space-based reflecting telescope with a 3-meter mirror, known provisionally as the Large Orbiting Telescope or Large Space Telescope (LST), with a launch slated for 1979. Congress eventually approved funding of US$36 million for 1978, and the design of the LST began in earnest, aiming for a launch date of 1983. During the early 1980s, the telescope was named after Edwin Hubble.

Hubble was originally intended to be retrieved and returned to Earth by the Space Shuttle, but the retrieval plan was later abandoned. On 31 October 2006, NASA Administrator Michael D. Griffin gave the go-ahead for a final refurbishment mission. The 11-day STS-125 mission by Space Shuttle Atlantis, launched on 11 May 2009, installed fresh batteries, replaced all gyroscopes, replaced a command computer, fixed several instruments, and installed the Wide Field Camera 3 and the Cosmic Origins Spectrograph.

=== Compton Gamma Ray Observatory ===
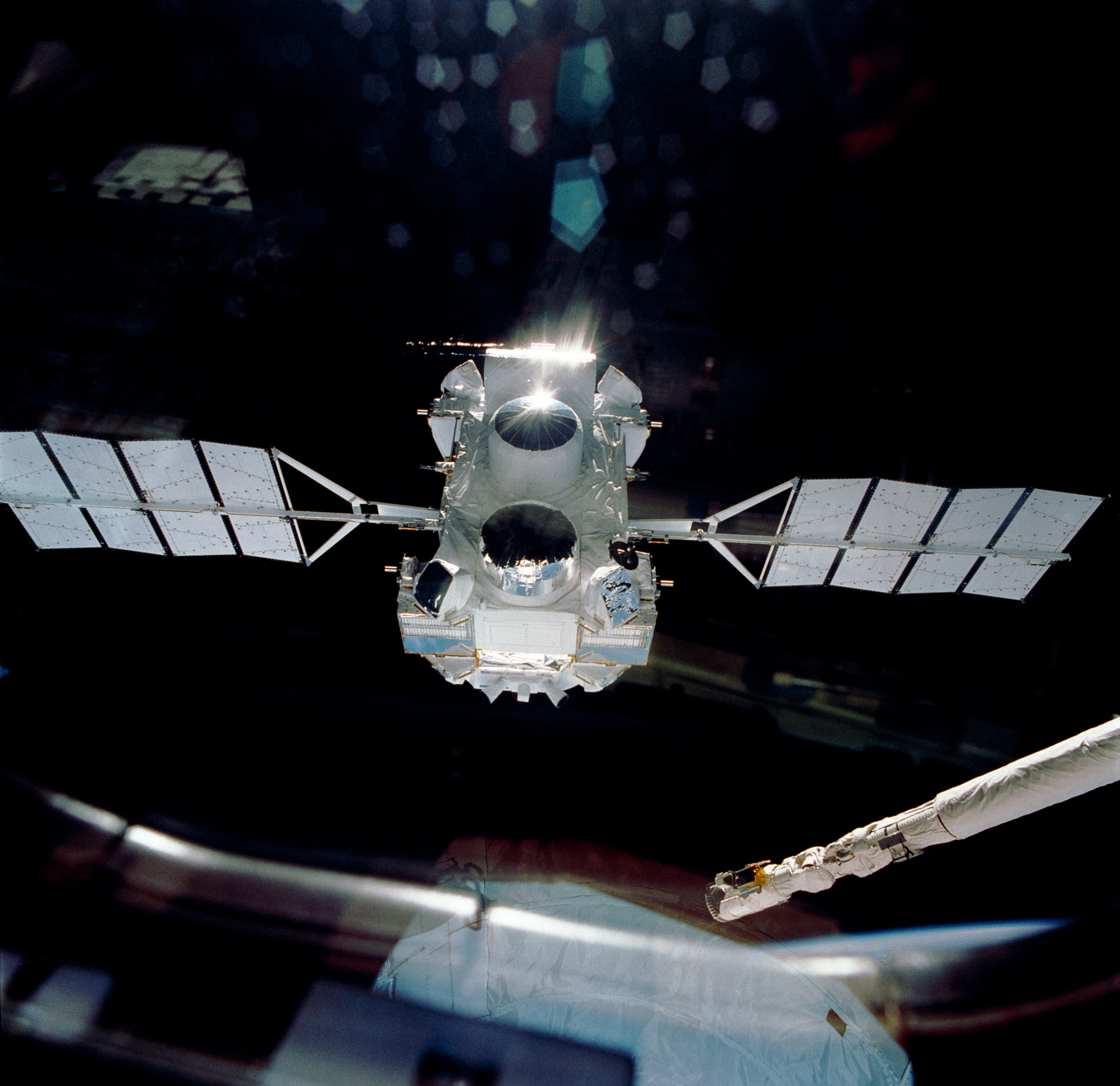
Compton Gamma Ray Observatory

Gamma rays had been examined above the atmosphere by several early space missions. During its High Energy Astronomy Observatory Program in 1977, NASA announced plans to build a "great observatory" for gamma-ray astronomy. The Gamma Ray Observatory (GRO), renamed Compton Gamma-Ray Observatory (CGRO), was designed to take advantage of the major advances in detector technology during the 1980s. Following 14 years of effort, the CGRO was launched on 5 April 1991. One of the three gyroscopes on the Compton Gamma Ray Observatory failed in December 1999. Although the observatory was fully functional with two gyroscopes, NASA judged that failure of a second gyroscope would result in inability to control the satellite during its eventual return to Earth due to orbital decay. NASA chose instead to preemptively de-orbit Compton on 4 June 2000. Parts that survived reentry splashed into the Pacific Ocean.

=== Chandra X-ray Observatory ===
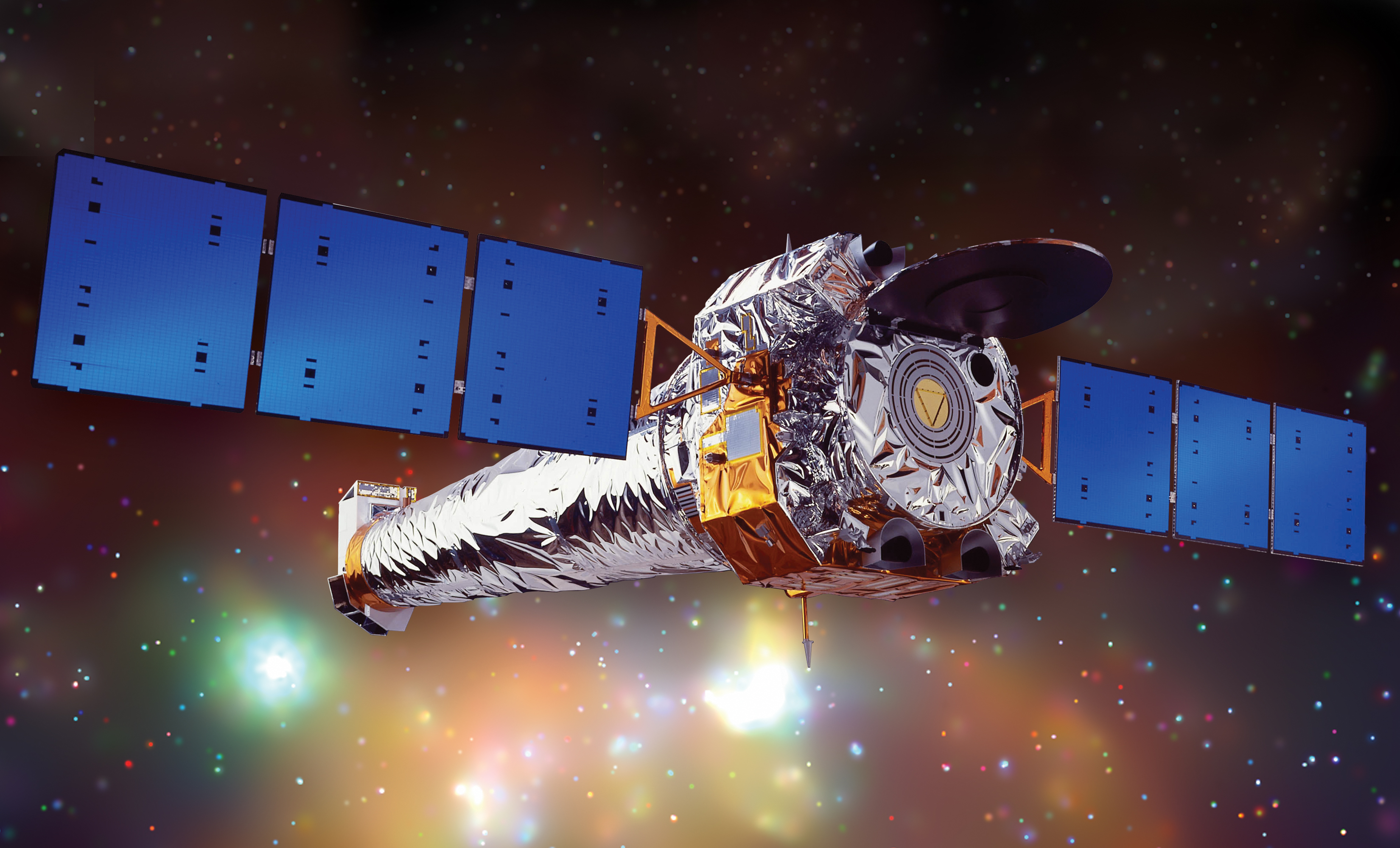
Chandra X-ray Observatory (artist's impression)

In 1976 the Chandra X-ray Observatory (called AXAF at the time) was proposed to NASA by Riccardo Giacconi and Harvey Tananbaum. Preliminary work began the following year at Marshall Space Flight Center (MSFC) and the Smithsonian Astrophysical Observatory (SAO). In the meantime, in 1978, NASA launched the first imaging X-ray telescope, Einstein Observatory (HEAO-2), into orbit. Work continued on the Chandra project through the 1980s and 1990s. In 1992, to reduce costs, the spacecraft was redesigned. Four of the twelve planned mirrors were eliminated, as were two of the six scientific instruments. Chandra's planned orbit was changed to an elliptical one, reaching one third of the way to the Moon's at its farthest point. This eliminated the possibility of improvement or repair by the Space Shuttle but put the observatory above the Earth's radiation belts for most of its orbit.

=== Spitzer Space Telescope ===
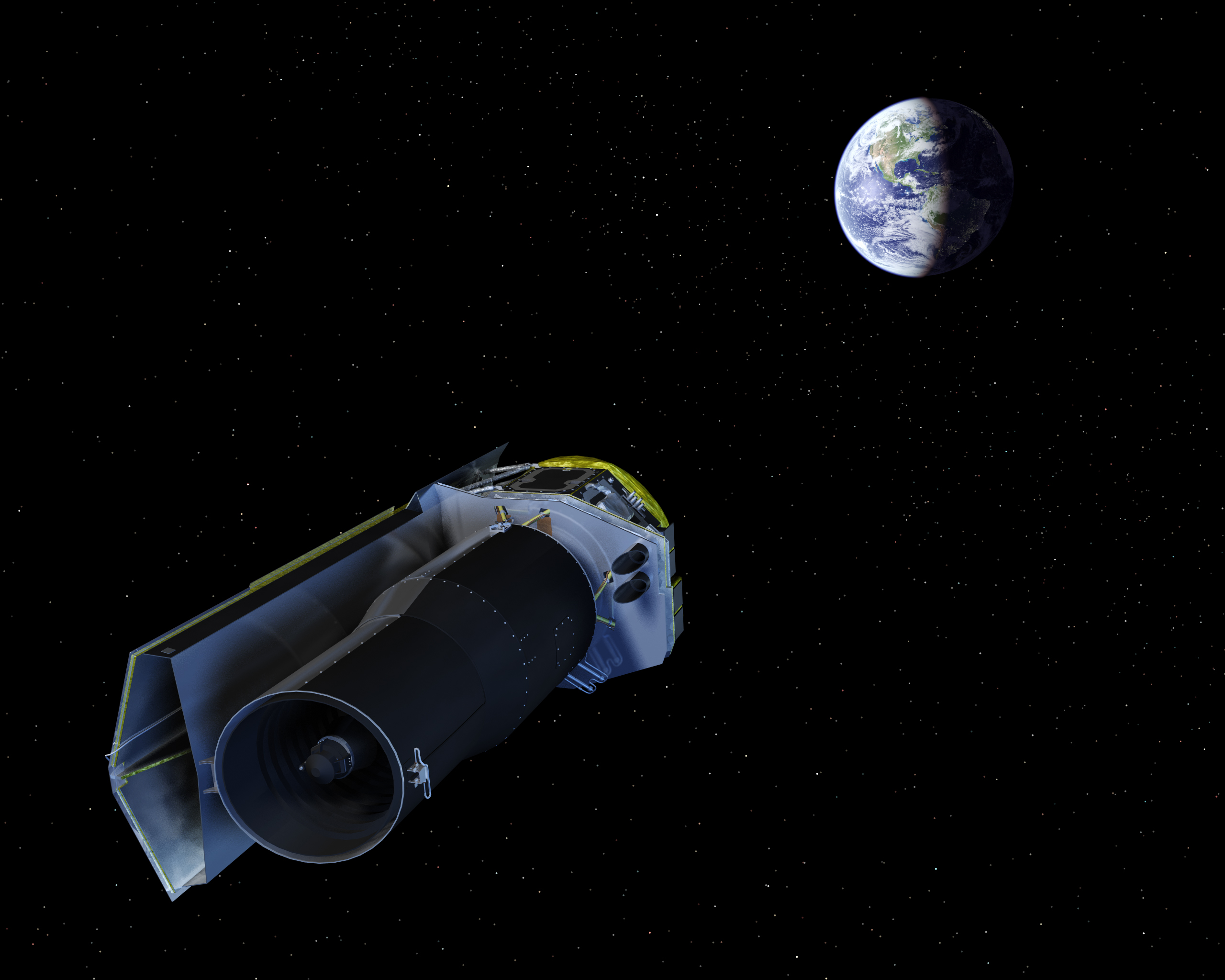
Spitzer Space Telescope pointing its high-gain antenna towards the Earth (artist's impression).

By the early 1970s, astronomers began to consider the possibility of placing an infrared telescope above the obscuring effects of the atmosphere of Earth. Most of the early concepts envisioned repeated flights aboard the NASA Space Shuttle. This approach was developed in an era when the Shuttle program was presumed to be capable of supporting weekly flights up to 30 days in duration. In 1979, a National Research Council of the National Academy of Sciences report, A Strategy for Space Astronomy and Astrophysics for the 1980s, identified a Shuttle Infrared Telescope Facility (SIRTF) as "one of two major astrophysics facilities [to be developed] for Spacelab," a Shuttle-borne platform.

The launch of the Infrared Astronomical Satellite, an Explorer-class satellite designed to conduct the first infrared survey of the sky led to anticipation of an instrument using new infrared detector technology. By September 1983, NASA was considering the "possibility of a long duration [free-flyer] SIRTF mission". The 1985 Spacelab-2 flight aboard STS-51-F confirmed the Shuttle environment was not well suited to an onboard infrared telescope, and a free-flying design was better. The first word of the name was changed from Shuttle so it would be called the Space Infrared Telescope Facility.

Spitzer was the only one of the Great Observatories not launched by the Space Shuttle. It was originally intended to be so launched, but after the Challenger disaster, the Centaur LH2/LOX upper stage that would have been required to push it into a heliocentric orbit was banned from Shuttle use. Titan and Atlas launch vehicles were canceled for cost reasons. After redesign and lightening, it was launched in 2003 by a Delta II launch vehicle instead. It was called the Space Infrared Telescope Facility (SIRTF) before launch. The telescope was deactivated when operations ended on 30 January 2020.

== Timeline ==
Timeline of NASA Great Observatories Program

== Strengths ==
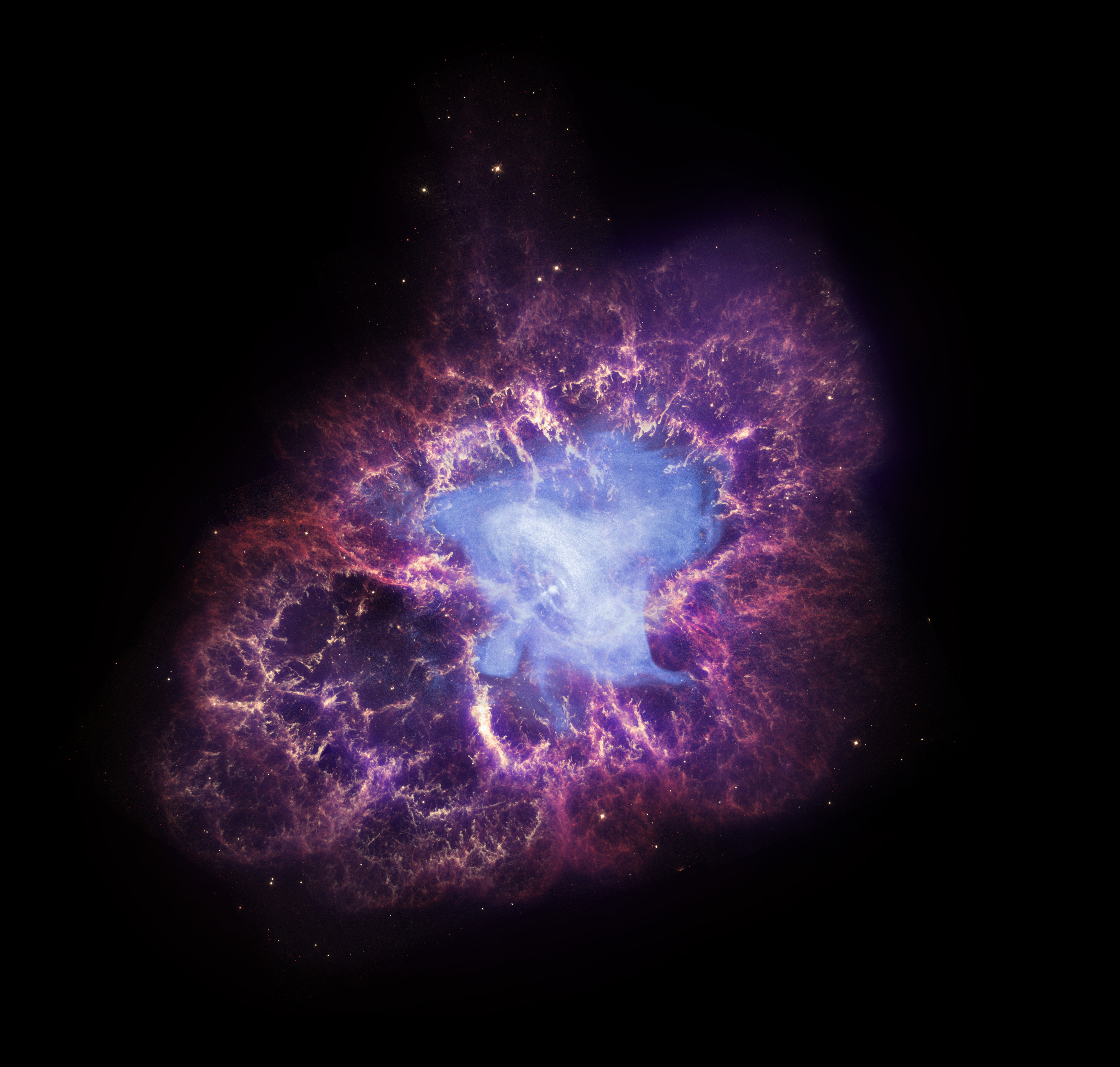
Chandra, Hubble, and Spitzer composite image of the Crab Nebula (2009)

Since the Earth's atmosphere prevents X-rays, gamma-rays and far-infrared radiation from reaching the ground, space missions were essential for the Compton, Chandra and Spitzer observatories. Hubble also benefits from being above the atmosphere, as the atmosphere blurs ground-based observations of very faint objects, decreasing spatial resolution. However, brighter objects can be imaged in much higher resolution than by Hubble from the ground using astronomical interferometers or adaptive optics. Larger ground-based telescopes have only recently matched Hubble in resolution for near-infrared wavelengths of faint objects. Being above the atmosphere eliminates the problem of airglow, allowing Hubble to make observations of ultra-faint objects. Ground-based telescopes cannot compensate for airglow on ultra-faint objects, so very faint objects require unwieldy and inefficient exposure times. Hubble can also observe at ultraviolet wavelengths which do not penetrate the atmosphere.

Each observatory was designed to push the state of technology in its region of the electromagnetic spectrum. Compton was much larger than any gamma-ray instruments flown on the previous HEAO missions, opening entirely new areas of observation. It had four instruments covering the 20 keV to 30 GeV energy range, which complemented each other's sensitivities, resolutions, and fields of view. Gamma rays are emitted by various high-energy and high-temperature sources, such as black holes, pulsars, and supernovae.

Chandra similarly had no ground predecessors. It followed the three NASA HEAO Program satellites, notably the highly successful Einstein Observatory, which was the first to demonstrate the power of grazing-incidence, focusing X-ray optics, giving spatial resolution an order of magnitude better than collimated instruments (comparable to optical telescopes), with an enormous improvement in sensitivity. Chandra's large size, high orbit, and sensitive CCDs allowed observations of very faint X-ray sources.

Spitzer also observes at wavelength largely inaccessible to ground telescopes. It was preceded in space by NASA's smaller IRAS mission and European Space Agency (ESA)'s large ISO telescope. Spitzer's instruments took advantage of the rapid advances in infrared detector technology since IRAS, combined with its large aperture, favorable fields of view, and long life. Science returns were accordingly outstanding. Infrared observations are necessary for very distant astronomical objects where all the visible light is redshifted to infrared wavelengths, for cool objects which emit little visible light, and for regions optically obscured by dust.

== Synergies ==
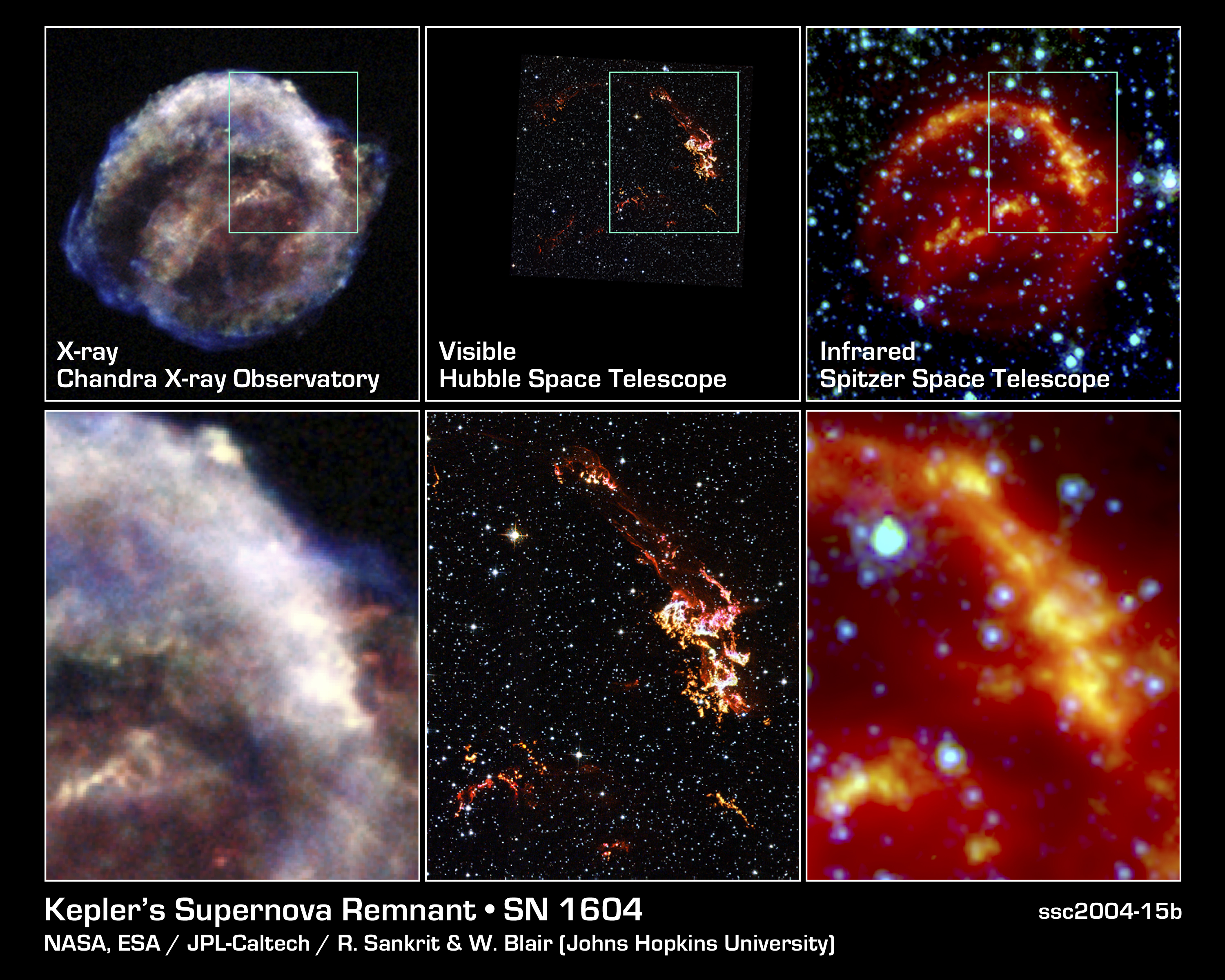
A labeled space image comparing views of a supernova remnant by three different Great observatories.

Aside from inherent mission capabilities (particularly sensitivities, which cannot be replicated by ground observatories), the Great Observatories program allows missions to interact for greater science return. Different objects shine in different wavelengths, but training two or more observatories on an object allows a deeper understanding.

High-energy studies (in X-rays and gamma rays) have had only moderate imaging resolutions so far. Studying X-ray and gamma-ray objects with Hubble, as well as Chandra and Compton, gives accurate size and positional data. In particular, Hubble's resolution can often discern whether the target is a standalone object, or part of a parent galaxy, and if a bright object is in the nucleus, arms, or halo of a spiral galaxy. Similarly, the smaller aperture of Spitzer means that Hubble can add finer spatial information to a Spitzer image. Reported in March 2016, Spitzer and Hubble were used to discover the most distant-known galaxy, GN-z11. This object was seen as it appeared 13.4 billion years ago (see also List of the most distant astronomical objects).

Ultraviolet studies with Hubble also reveal the temporal states of high-energy objects. X-rays and gamma rays are harder to detect with current technologies than visible and ultraviolet. Therefore, Chandra and Compton needed long integration times to gather enough photons. However, objects which shine in X-rays and gamma rays can be small, and can vary on timescales of minutes or seconds. Such objects then call for follow-up with Hubble or the Rossi X-ray Timing Explorer, which can measure details in angular seconds or fractions of a second, due to different designs. Rossi's last full year of operation was 2011.

The ability of Spitzer to see through dust and thick gases is good for galactic nuclei observations. Massive objects at the hearts of galaxies shine in X-rays, gamma rays, and radio waves, but infrared studies into these clouded regions can reveal the number and positions of objects.

Hubble, meanwhile, has neither the field of view nor the available time to study all interesting objects. Worthwhile targets are often found with ground telescopes, which are cheaper, or with smaller space observatories, which are sometimes expressly designed to cover large areas of the sky. Also, the other three Great Observatories have found interesting new objects, which merit diversion of Hubble.

One example of observatory synergy is Solar System and asteroid studies. Small bodies, such as small moons and asteroids, are too small and/or distant to be directly resolved even by Hubble; their image appears as a diffraction pattern determined by brightness, not size. However, the minimum size can be deduced by Hubble through knowledge of the body's albedo. The maximum size can be determined by Spitzer through knowledge of the body's temperature, which is largely known from its orbit. Thus, the body's true size is bracketed. Further spectroscopy by Spitzer can determine the chemical composition of the object's surface, which limits its possible albedos, and therefore sharpens the low size estimate.

At the opposite end of the cosmic distance ladder, observations made with Hubble, Spitzer and Chandra have been combined in the Great Observatories Origins Deep Survey to yield a multi-wavelength picture of galaxy formation and evolution in the early Universe.

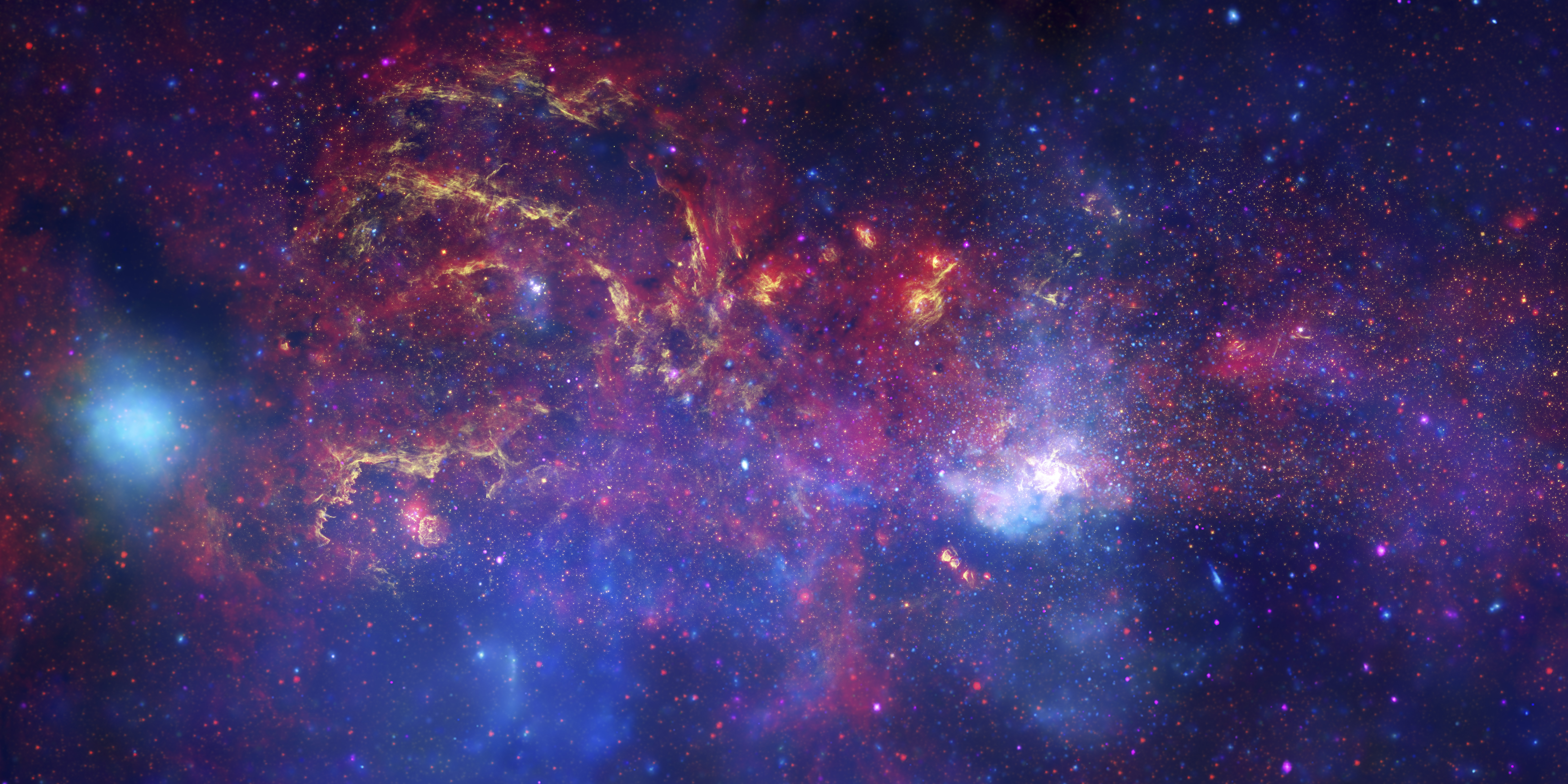
Milky Way Galactic Center as seen by the Hubble Space Telescope, the Spitzer Space Telescope, and the Chandra X-ray Observatory

== Impact ==
The opening of new wavebands to high resolution, high sensitivity observations by the Compton, Chandra and Spitzer telescopes has revolutionized our understanding of a wide range of astronomical objects, and has led to the detection of thousands of new objects. Hubble has had a larger public and media impact than the other telescopes, although at optical wavelengths Hubble has provided a modest improvement in sensitivity and resolution over existing instruments. Hubble's capability for uniform high-quality imaging of any astronomical object at any time has allowed surveys and comparisons of large numbers of astronomical objects. The Hubble Deep Field observations of distant galaxies provide rest-frame ultraviolet images with a similar number of pixels across the galaxies as previous ultraviolet images of closer galaxies, allowing direct comparison.

== Successors to Great Observatories ==
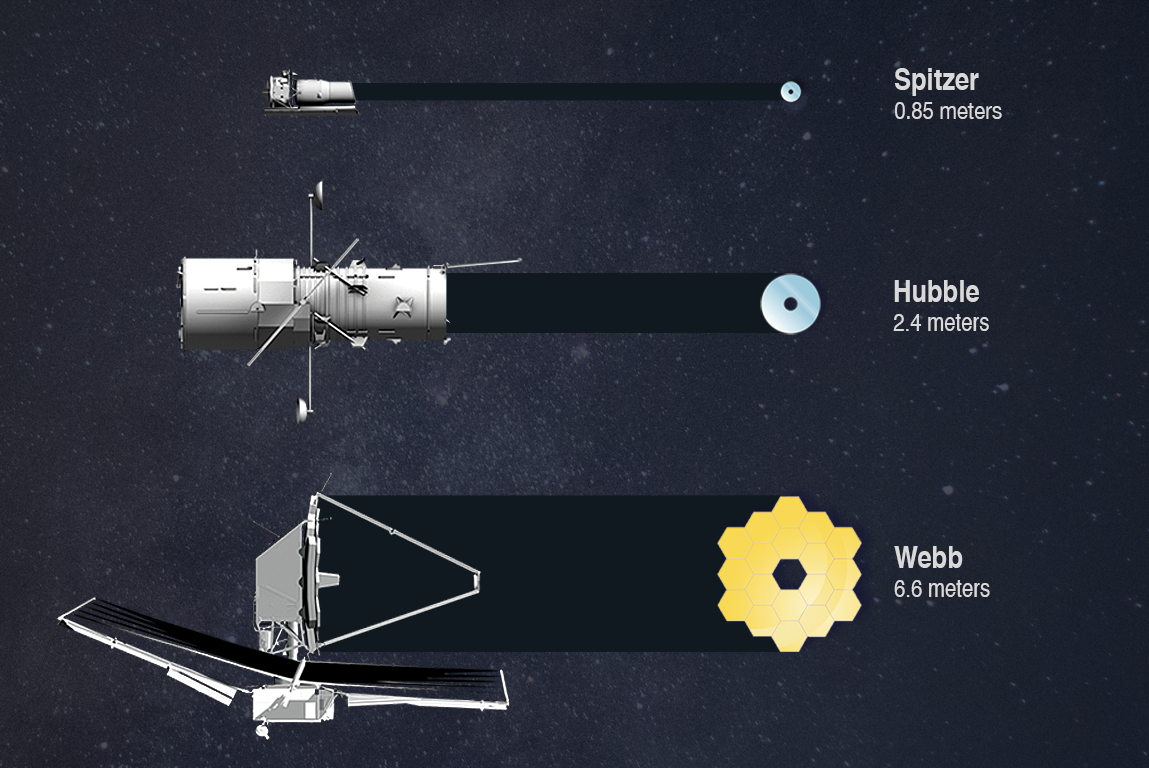
Primary mirror size comparison of Spitzer, Hubble, and Webb telescopes

- The James Webb Space Telescope (JWST) launched in December 2021 and works simultaneously with Hubble. Its segmented, deployable mirror is over twice as wide as the Hubble's, increasing angular resolution noticeably, and sensitivity dramatically. Unlike Hubble, JWST observes in the infrared, in order to penetrate dust at cosmological distances. This means it continues some Spitzer capabilities, while some Hubble capabilities are lost in the visible and especially the ultraviolet wavelengths. JWST exceeds Spitzer's performance in near-infrared. The European Space Agency's Herschel Space Observatory, operational from 2009 to 2013, has exceeded Spitzer in the far-infrared. The SOFIA (Stratospheric Observatory for Infrared Astronomy) airborne platform observed in near- and mid-infrared. SOFIA had a larger aperture than Spitzer, but lower relative sensitivity.
- The Fermi Gamma-ray Space Telescope (FGRST), formerly known as the Gamma Ray Large Area Space Telescope, is a follow-on to Compton launched on 11 June 2008. FGRST is more narrowly defined, and much smaller; it carries only one main instrument and a secondary experiment, the Large Area Telescope (LAT) and the Gamma-ray Burst Monitor (GBM). FGRST is complemented by Swift, launched in 2004, and previously by HETE-2, launched in 2000.
- The Reuven Ramaty High Energy Solar Spectroscopic Imager (RHESSI), observed in some Compton and Chandra wavelengths between its February 2002 launch and April 2023 decommissioning. RHESSI was pointed at the Sun at all times, but it occasionally observed high-energy objects in its peripheral view.
- Another large, high-energy observatory is INTEGRAL, Europe's INTErnational Gamma Ray Astrophysics Laboratory, launched in 2002. It observes in similar frequencies to Compton. INTEGRAL uses a fundamentally different telescope technology, coded-aperture masks. Thus, its capabilities are complementary to Compton and Fermi.

== Later programs ==
- The Beyond Einstein program will seek to develop new areas of science. Constellation-X and the Laser Interferometer Space Antenna (LISA) have been referred to by NASA as the Einstein Great Observatories, to differentiate them from the current generation. However, they are not a part of the Great Observatories program.
- The International Solar-Terrestrial Physics Science Initiative (ISTP), in the spirit of the Great Observatories program, is a group of instruments to study the Sun and related electromagnetic phenomena near Earth.

== Next Great Observatory ==
In 2016, NASA began considering four different Flagship space telescopes, they are the Habitable Exoplanet Imaging Mission (HabEx), Large UV Optical Infrared Surveyor (LUVOIR), Origins Space Telescope (OST), and Lynx X-ray Observatory. In 2019, the four teams will turn their final reports over to the National Academy of Sciences, whose independent Decadal Survey committee advises NASA on which mission should take top priority.

NASA announced the Habitable Worlds Observatory (HWO) in 2023, a successor building on the Large UV Optical Infrared Surveyor (LUVOIR) and Habitable Exoplanet Imaging Mission (HabEX) proposals. The administration also created the Great Observatory Maturation Program for the development of the Habitable Worlds Observatory.

== See also ==
- Beyond Einstein program
- Herschel Space Telescope (Far infrared space observatory, 2009–2013)
- List of space telescopes
