= High Throughput X-ray Spectroscopy mission =

High Throughput X-ray Spectroscopy mission may refer to:

- Constellation-X Observatory
- XMM-Newton
