= XEUS =

European X-ray space observatory

X-ray Evolving Universe Spectroscopy
- Names: XEUS
- Mission type: Space telescope
- Operator: European Space Agency (ESA)

Orbital parameters
- Reference system: L2 orbit

Instruments
- Wide-Field X-ray Imager (WFXI)

XEUS (X-ray Evolving Universe Spectroscopy) was a space observatory plan developed by the European Space Agency (ESA) as a successor to the successful XMM-Newton X-ray satellite telescope. It was merged to the International X-ray Observatory (IXO) around 2008, but as that project ran into issues in 2011, the ESA component was forked off into Advanced Telescope for High Energy Astrophysics (Athena).

XEUS consisted of a mirror spacecraft that carried a large X-ray telescope, with a mirror area of about 5 m² and an imaging resolution better than 5 arcsec; for X-ray radiation with an energy of 1 keV. A detector spacecraft would have flown in formation with the telescope at a distance of approximately 50 m, in the focus of the telescope. The detectors would have included a wide-field X-ray imager with an energy resolution of 150 eV at 6 keV, as well as a cryogenic narrow-field imager with an energy resolution of 2 eV at 1 keV.

XEUS could have measured the X-ray spectrum and thereby the composition, temperature and velocities of hot matter in the early universe. It would address diverse questions like the origin and nature of black holes, their relation with star formation, baryons evolution, and the formation of the heavy elements in the Universe.

The technology required for the follow-on project of XEUS, the International X-ray Observatory, eventually leading to Advanced Telescope for High Energy Astrophysics (Athena) which is currently under development. XEUS was one of the candidates for the Cosmic Vision programme of the European Space Agency.

== Recent developments ==
In May 2008, ESA and NASA established a coordination group involving three agencies - ESA, NASA and JAXA - with the intent of exploring a joint mission merging the ongoing XEUS and Constellation-X (Con-X) projects. This proposed the start of a joint study for the International X-ray Observatory (IXO).

== See also ==
- Calorimeter
