= Charles J. Pellerin Jr. =

American astrophysicist

Charles J Pellerin Jr.
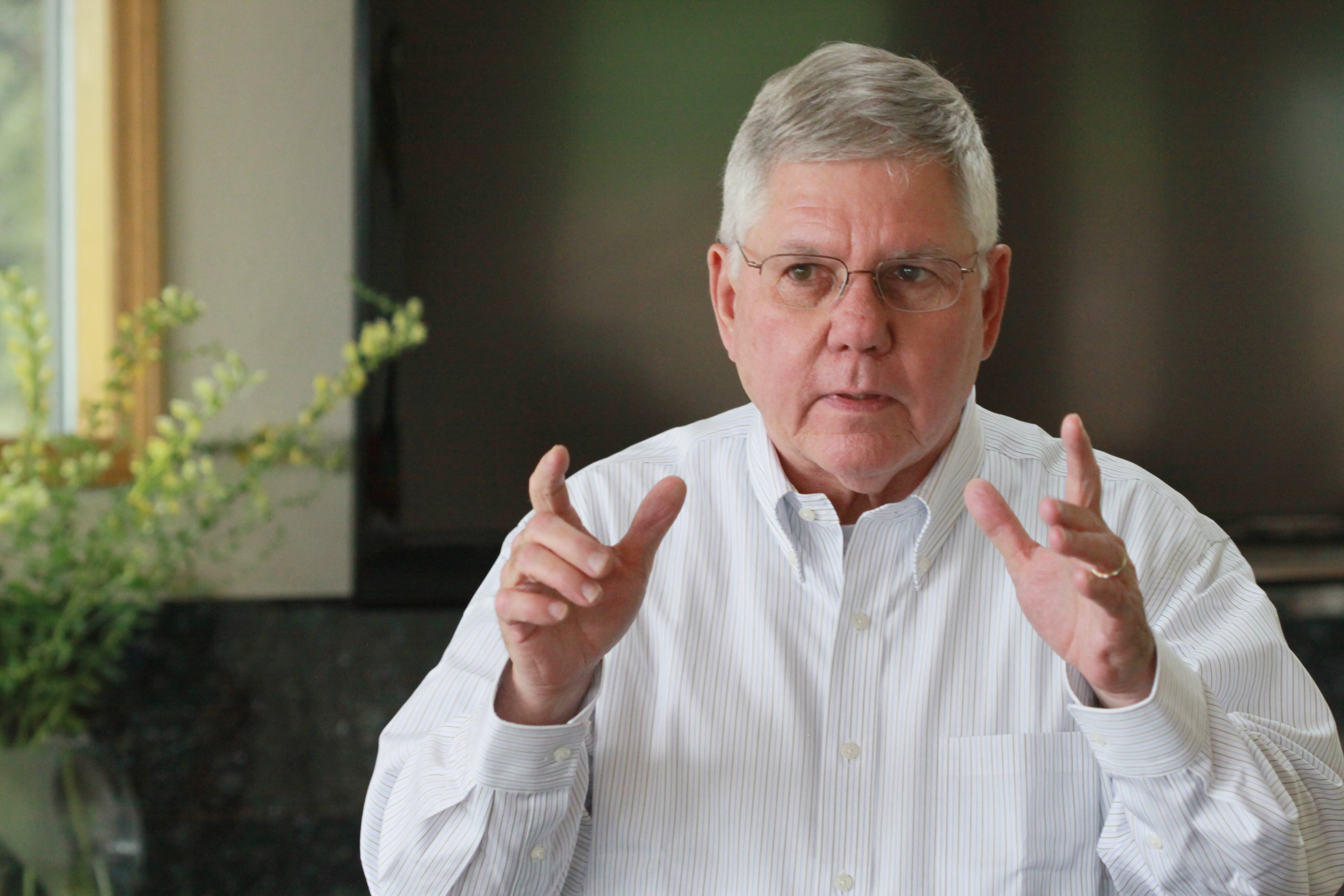
- Born: December 11, 1944; Shreveport, Louisiana
- Education: Drexel University (BS); Catholic University of America (MS and PhD in Astrophysics); Harvard Business School (General Management Program)
- Known for: Great Observatories program Hubble Space Telescope
- Scientific career
- Fields: Astrophysics
- Workplaces: Goddard Space Flight Center; NASA

Charles James Pellerin Jr. (born December 11, 1944), better known as Charlie Pellerin, is an American astrophysicist, former NASA executive, author, and academic.

== Career ==
=== NASA ===
Pellerin joined Goddard Space Flight Center as a physicist and instrument designer in 1967. He conducted experiments in solar physics and published in the journal Solar Physics.

Pellerin worked as deputy director, Spacelab Flight at NASA Headquarters (1976–1982); director of astrophysics division (1983–1992); and associate deputy administrator for strategic planning (1992–1993). As Director of Astrophysics for a decade from 1983, he oversaw a $750 million annual program launching a dozen satellites.

According to Britannica, "The Great Observatories concept was developed in the mid-1980s by American engineer Charles Pellerin, then Director of Astrophysics at the National Aeronautics and Space Administration (NASA), as a way of providing an umbrella for four large, expensive astrophysics missions that otherwise might be viewed as funding competitors." The Great Observatories program, included the Hubble Space Telescope, Compton Gamma Ray Observatory, Chandra X-ray Observatory, and Spitzer Space Telescope.

After the Hubble Space Telescope was launched in 1990 with a flawed mirror, Pellerin organized the mission to repair the telescope in space.

=== Academia ===
On a sabbatical from NASA, Pellerin joined the business school of the University of Colorado, where he taught a course titled "21st Century Leadership." Taking lessons from the organisational problems that led to the Hubble Space Telescope's mirror flaw, Pellerin developed a team-building approach that he called the '4-D System'. Pellerin then founded a company called 4-D Systems to promote this concept.

== Publications ==
In 2009, Wiley published Pellerin's book “How NASA Builds Teams: Mission Critical Soft Skills for Scientists, Engineers, and Project Teams.”
