= Joint Dark Energy Mission =

Proposed space probe

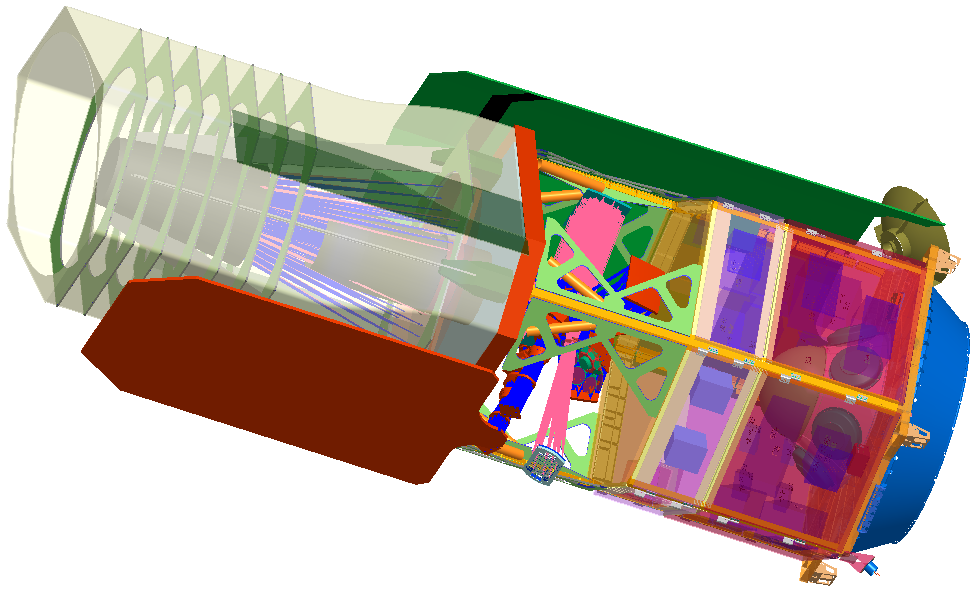
JDEM design proposal

The Joint Dark Energy Mission (JDEM) was an Einstein probe that planned to focus on investigating dark energy. JDEM was a partnership between NASA and the U.S. Department of Energy (DOE).

In August 2010, the Board on Physics and Astronomy of the National Science Foundation (NSF) recommended the Wide Field Infrared Survey Telescope (WFIRST) mission, a renamed JDEM-Omega proposal which has superseded SNAP, Destiny, and Advanced Dark Energy Physics Telescope (ADEPT), as the highest priority for development in the decade around 2020. This would be a 1.5-meter telescope with a 144-megapixel HgCdTe focal plane array, located at the Sun-Earth L2 Lagrange point. The expected cost is around US$1.6 billion.

== Earlier proposals ==
=== Dark Energy Space Telescope (Destiny) ===
The Dark Energy Space Telescope (Destiny), was a planned project by NASA and DOE, designed to perform precision measurements of the universe to provide an understanding of dark energy. The space telescope will derive the expansion of the universe by measuring up to 3,000 distant supernovae each year of its three-year mission lifetime, and will additionally study the structure of matter in the universe by measuring millions of galaxies in a weak gravitational lensing survey. The Destiny spacecraft features an optical telescope with a 1.8 metre primary mirror. The telescope images infrared light onto an array of solid-state detectors. The mission is designed to be deployed in a halo orbit about the Sun-Earth L_{2} Lagrange point.

The Destiny proposal has been superseded by the Wide Field Infrared Survey Telescope (WFIRST).

=== SuperNova Acceleration Probe (SNAP) ===
The SuperNova Acceleration Probe (SNAP) mission was proposed to provide an understanding of the mechanism driving the acceleration of the universe and determine the nature of dark energy. To achieve these goals, the spacecraft needed to be able to detect these supernova when they are at their brightest moment. The mission was proposed as an experiment for the JDEM. The satellite observatory would be capable of measuring up to 2,000 distant supernovae each year of its three-year mission lifetime. SNAP was also planned to observe the small distortions of light from distant galaxies to reveal more about the expansion history of the universe. SNAP was initially planned to launch in 2013.

To understand what is driving the acceleration of the universe, scientists need to see greater redshifts from supernovas than what is seen from Earth. The SNAP would detect redshifts of 1.7 from distant supernovas up to 10 billion light years away. At this distance, the acceleration of the universe is easily seen. To measure the presence of dark energy, a process called weak lensing can be used.

The SNAP would have used an optical setup called the three-mirror anastigmat. This consists of a main mirror with a diameter of 2 meters to take in light. It reflects this light to a second mirror. Then this light is transferred to two additional smaller mirrors which direct the light to the spacecraft's instruments. It will also contain 72 different cameras. 36 of them are able to detect visible light and the other 36 detect infrared light. Its cameras combined produces the equivalence of a 600 megapixel camera. The resolution of the camera is about 0.2 arcseconds in the visible spectrum and 0.3 arcseconds in the infrared spectrum. The SNAP would also have a spectrograph attached to it. The purpose of it is to detect what type of supernova SNAP is observing, determine the redshift, detect changes between different supernovas, and store supernova spectra for future reference.

JDEM recognized several potential problems of the SNAP project:

- The supernovas that SNAP would detect may not all be SN 1a type. Some other 1b and 1c type supernovas have similar spectra which could potentially confuse SNAP.
- Hypothetical gray dust could contaminate results. Gray dust absorbs all wavelengths of light, making supernovas dimmer than they actually are.
- The behavior of supernovas could potentially be altered by its binary-star system.
- Any objects between the viewed supernova and the SNAP could gravitationally produce inaccurate results.

The SNAP proposal has been superseded by the Wide Field Infrared Survey Telescope (WFIRST).

== See also ==
- Wide-field Infrared Survey Explorer (2009–2011)
