= Big Bang Observer =

Gravitational waves space observatory

The Big Bang Observer (BBO) is a proposed space observatory for gravitational waves by the European Space Agency. A successor to the Laser Interferometer Space Antenna (LISA), its primary scientific goal would be the observation of gravitational waves from the time shortly after the Big Bang, but it would also be able to detect younger sources of gravitational radiation, like binary inspirals. BBO would likely be sensitive to all LIGO and LISA sources, and others. Its extreme sensitivity would come from the higher-power lasers, and correlation of signals from several different interferometers that would be placed around the Sun.

The first phase resembles LISA, consisting of three spacecraft flown in a triangular pattern. The second phase adds three more triangles (twelve spacecraft total), spaced 120° apart in solar orbit, with one position having two overlapping triangles in a hexagram formation.

The individual satellites would differ from those in LISA by having far more powerful lasers. In addition each triangle will be much smaller than the triangles in LISA's pattern, about 50,000 km instead of 1 to 5 million km. Because of this smaller size, the test masses will experience smaller tidal deviations, and thus can be locked on a particular fringe of the interferometer — much as in LIGO. By contrast, LISA's test masses will fly in an essentially free orbit, with the spacecraft flying around them, and interferometer fringes will simply be counted, in a technique called "time-delay interferometry".

The BBO instruments present massive technological challenges. Funding has not been allocated for development, and even if selected for development, optimistic estimates place the instrument's launch date many decades away.

== See also ==
- Cosmic gravitational wave background
- Gravitational wave
- Laser Interferometer Space Antenna
- LISA Pathfinder
