= Laser Interferometer Space Antenna =

European space mission to measure gravitational waves

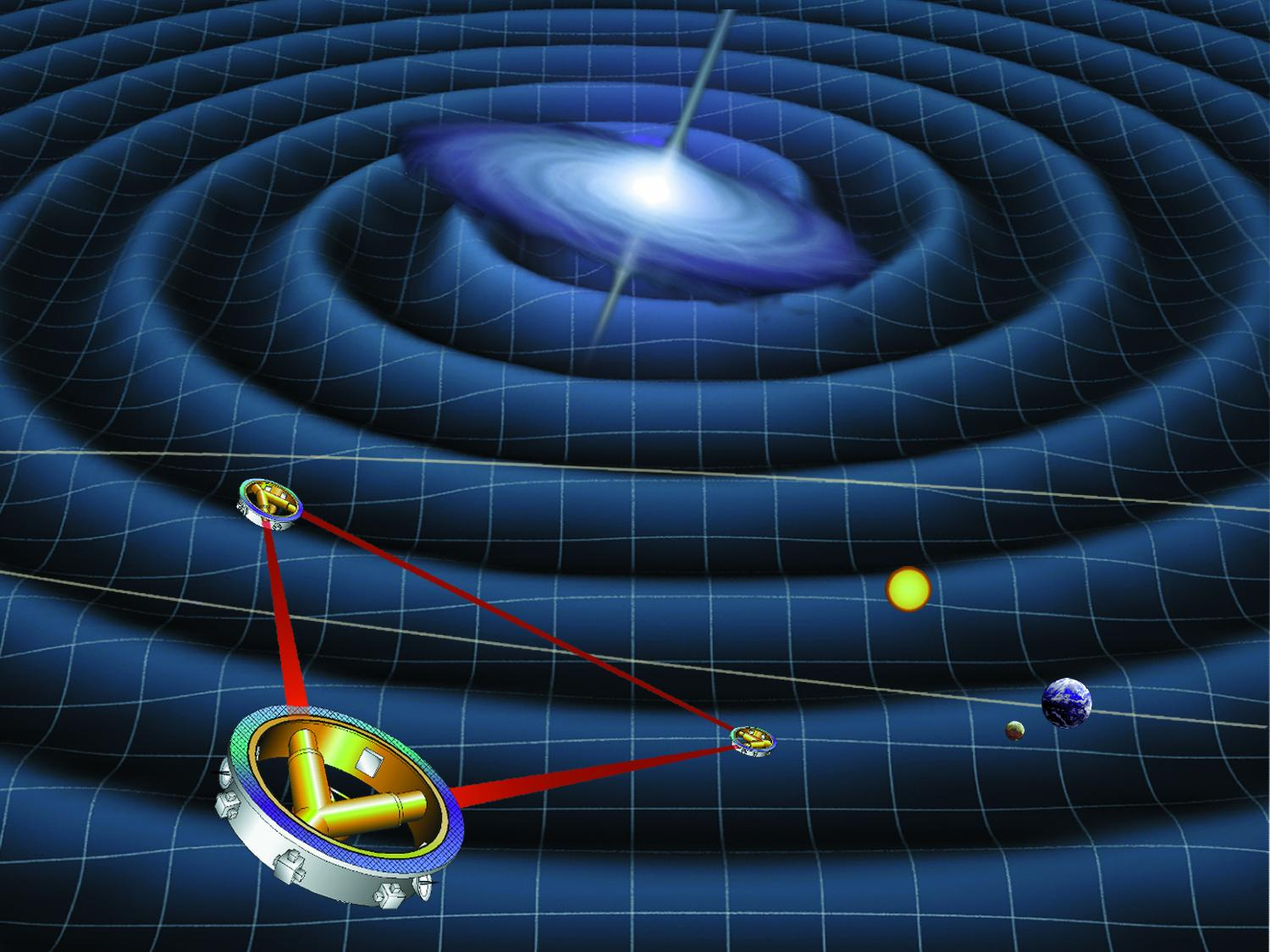
- Artist's conception of LISA spacecraft
- Mission type: Gravitational waves observation
- Operator: ESA
- Website: www.lisamission.org
- Mission duration: Nominal Science Phase 4.5 years, Mission lifetime 6.25 years

Spacecraft properties
- Manufacturer: OHB System AG with Thales Alenia Space
- Launch mass: 8212 kg

Start of mission
- Launch date: 2035 (planned)
- Rocket: Ariane 6
- Launch site: Kourou ELA-4
- Contractor: Arianespace

Orbital parameters
- Reference system: Heliocentric
- Semi-major axis: 1 AU
- Period: 1 year
- ESA insignia Cosmic Vision (Science Programme)

The Laser Interferometer Space Antenna (LISA) is a planned European space mission to detect and measure gravitational waves—slight ripples in the fabric of spacetime—from astronomical sources. LISA will be the first dedicated space-based gravitational-wave observatory. It aims to measure gravitational waves directly by using laser interferometry. The LISA concept features three spacecraft arranged in an equilateral triangle with each side 2.5 million kilometres long, flying in an Earth-like heliocentric orbit. The relative acceleration between the satellites is precisely monitored to detect a passing gravitational wave, which are distortions of spacetime travelling at the speed of light.

Potential sources for signals are merging supermassive black holes at the centre of galaxies, massive black holes orbited by small compact objects, known as extreme mass ratio inspirals, binaries of compact stars, substellar objects orbiting such binaries, and possibly other sources of cosmological origin, such as a cosmological phase transition shortly after the Big Bang, and speculative astrophysical objects like cosmic strings and domain boundaries.

The mission was selected by ESA in 2017 and formally adopted in January 2024. Construction began in 2025 following the award of the prime industrial contract to OHB System AG. As of 2026, LISA remains in the development and hardware-construction phase, with launch planned for approximately 2035 aboard an Ariane 6 launch vehicle. The mission will consist of three spacecraft flying in a triangular formation with 2.5 million km arm lengths to detect low-frequency gravitational waves from sources such as merging supermassive black holes and compact binary systems.

== Mission overview ==
LISA spacecraft orbitography and interferometer – yearly-periodic revolution in heliocentric orbit

The LISA mission's primary objective is to detect and measure gravitational waves produced by compact binary systems and mergers of supermassive black holes. LISA will observe gravitational waves by measuring differential changes in the length of its arms, as sensed by laser interferometry. Each of the three LISA spacecraft contains two telescopes, two lasers and two test masses (each a 46 mm, roughly 2 kg, gold-coated cube of gold/platinum), arranged in two optical assemblies pointed at the other two spacecraft. These form Michelson-like interferometers, each centred on one of the spacecraft, with the test masses defining the ends of the arms. The entire arrangement, which is ten times larger than the orbit of the Moon, will be placed in solar orbit at the same distance from the Sun as the Earth, but trailing the Earth by 20 degrees, and with the orbital planes of the three spacecraft inclined relative to the ecliptic by about 0.33 degree, which results in the plane of the triangular spacecraft formation being tilted 60 degrees from the plane of the ecliptic. The mean linear distance between the formation and the Earth will be 50 million kilometres.

To eliminate non-gravitational forces such as light pressure and solar wind on the test masses, each spacecraft is constructed as a zero-drag satellite. The test mass floats free inside, effectively in free-fall, while the spacecraft around it absorbs all these local non-gravitational forces. Then, using capacitive sensing to determine the spacecraft's position relative to the mass, very precise thrusters adjust the spacecraft so that it follows, keeping itself centred around the mass.

=== Arm length ===
The longer the arms, the more sensitive the detector is to long-period gravitational waves, but its sensitivity to wavelengths shorter than the arms is reduced (2,500,000 km is 8.3 lightseconds, or 0.12 Hz; compare to LIGO's peak sensitivity around 500 Hz). As the satellites are free-flying, the spacing is easily adjusted before launch, with upper bounds being imposed by the sizes of the telescopes required at each end of the interferometer (which are constrained by the size of the launch vehicle's payload fairing) and the stability of the constellation orbit (larger constellations are more sensitive to the gravitational effects of other planets, limiting the mission lifetime). Another length-dependent factor which must be compensated for is the "point-ahead angle" between the incoming and outgoing laser beams; the telescope must receive its incoming beam from where its partner was a few seconds ago, but send its outgoing beam to where its partner will be a few seconds from now.

The original 2008 LISA proposal had arms 5 million kilometres (5 million km) long. When downscoped to eLISA in 2013, arms of 1 million kilometres were proposed. The approved 2017 LISA proposal has arms 2.5 million kilometres (2.5 million km) long.

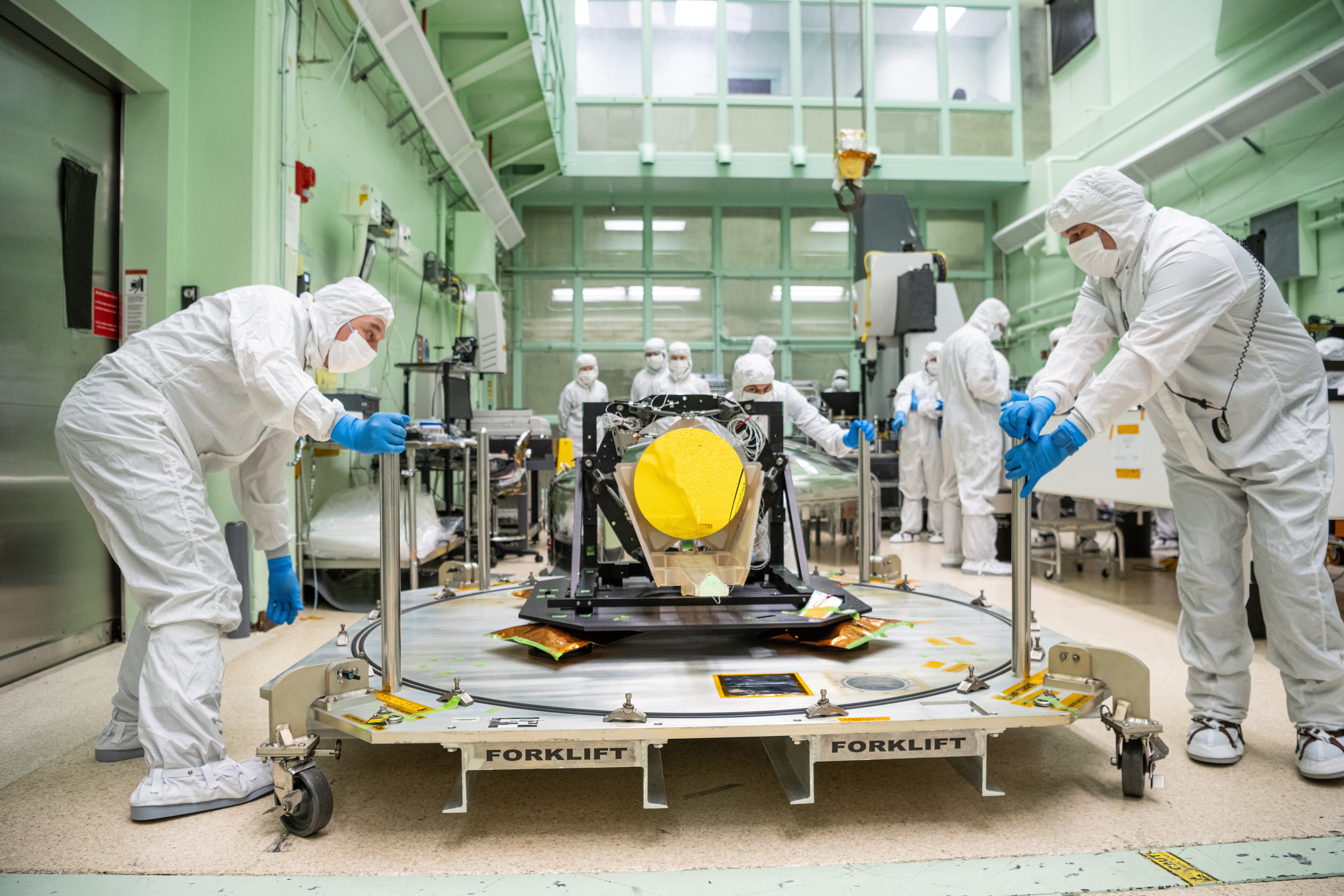
The full-scale Engineering Development Unit Telescope for the LISA at NASA's Goddard Space Flight Center, 2024

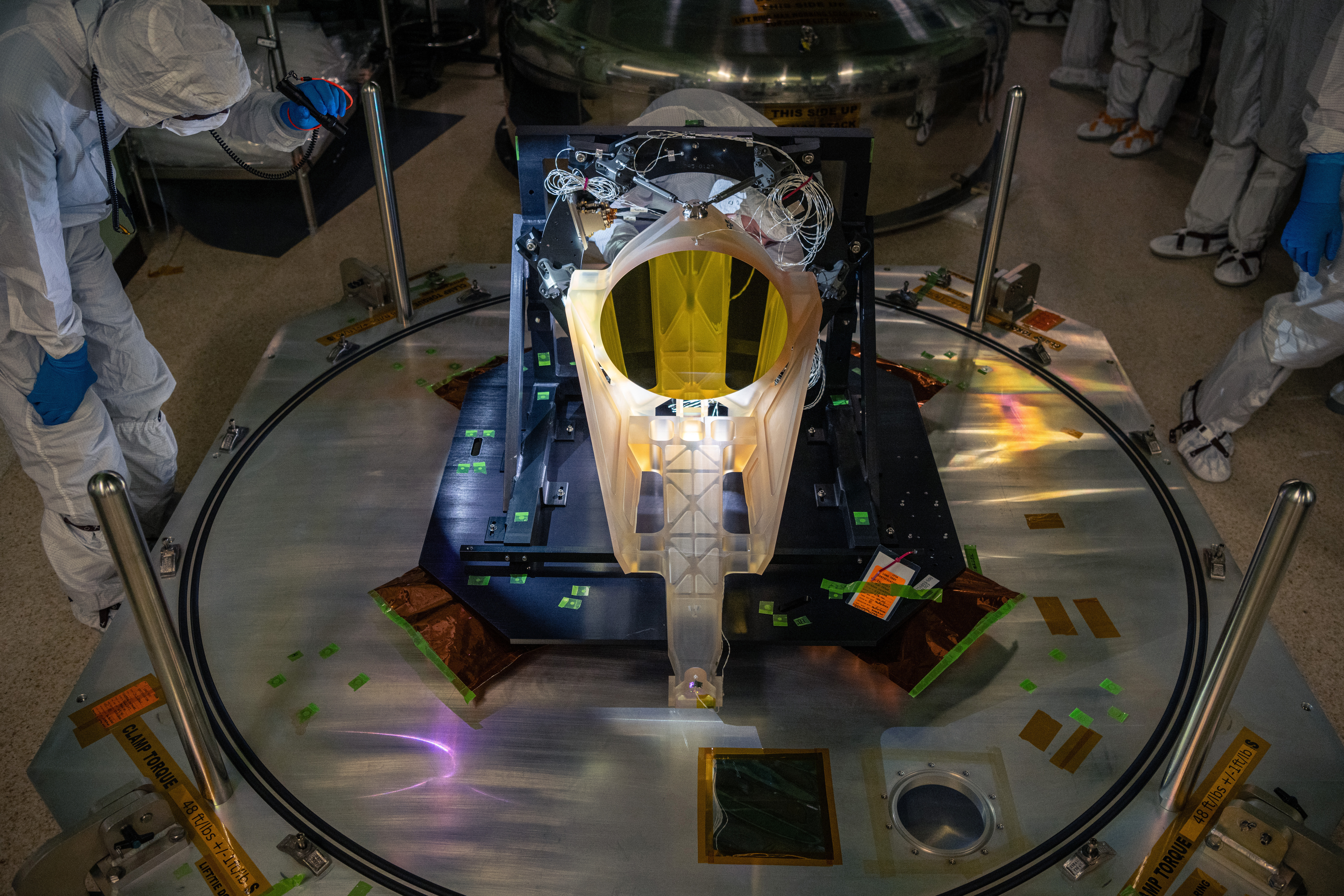
NASA technicians inspect the prototype

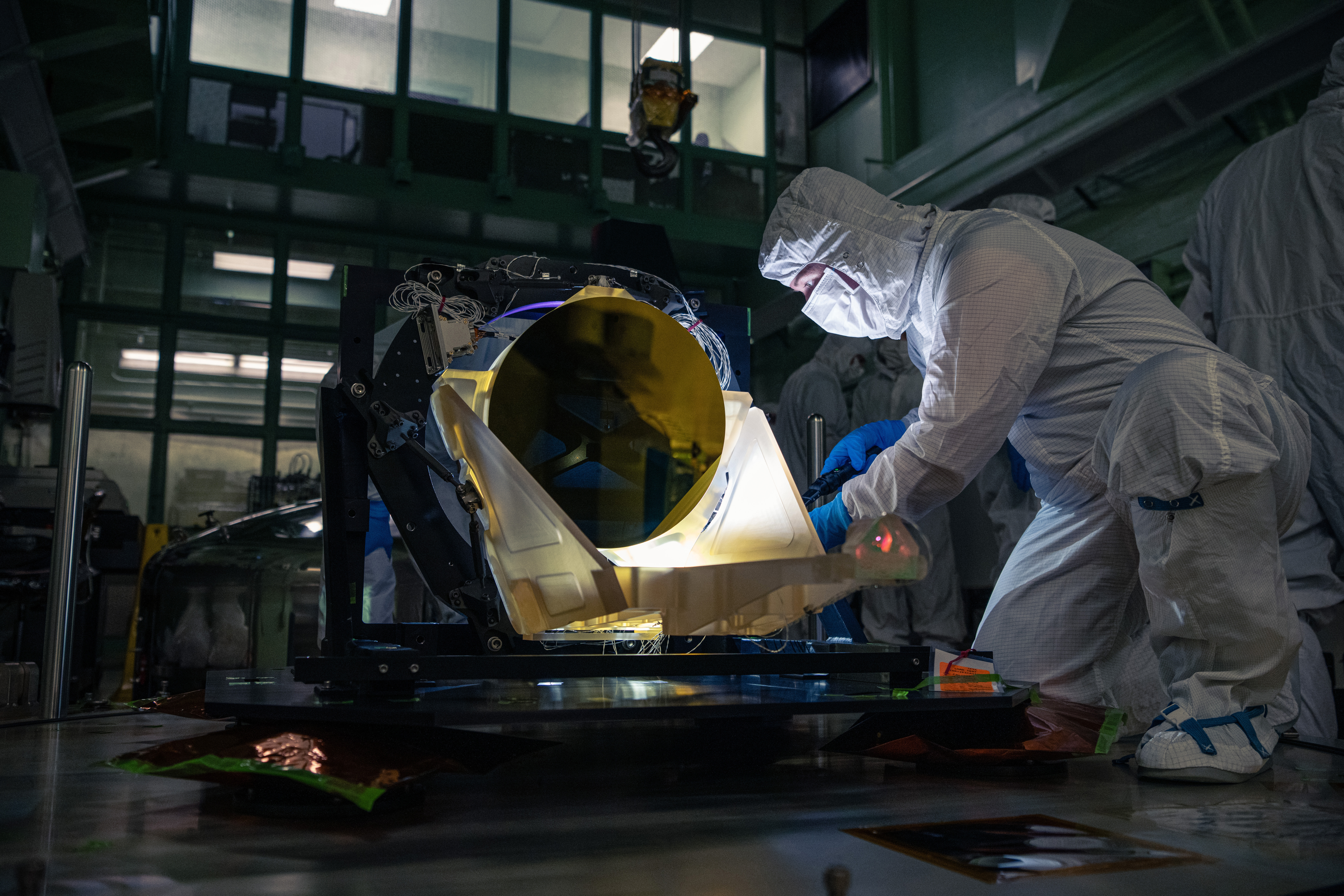
The entire telescope is made from an amber-coloured glass-ceramic that resists changes in shape over a wide temperature range, and the mirror's surface is coated in gold.

== History ==
=== Proposal ===
The first design studies for a gravitational-wave detector to be flown in space were performed in the 1980s under the name LAGOS (Laser Antenna for Gravitational radiation Observation in Space). LISA was first proposed as a mission to ESA in the early 1990s. First as a candidate for the M3-cycle, and later as 'cornerstone mission' for the 'Horizon 2000 plus' program. As the decade progressed, the design was refined to a triangular configuration of three spacecraft with three 5-million-kilometre arms. This mission was pitched as a joint mission between ESA and NASA in 1997.

In the 2000s the joint ESA/NASA LISA mission was identified as a candidate for the 'L1' slot in ESA's Cosmic Vision 2015–2025 programme. However, due to budget cuts, NASA announced in early 2011 that it would not be contributing to any of ESA's L-class missions. ESA nonetheless decided to push the program forward, and instructed the L1 candidate missions to present reduced cost versions that could be flown within ESA's budget. A reduced version of LISA was designed with only two 1-million-kilometre arms under the name NGO (New/Next Gravitational wave Observatory). Despite NGO being ranked highest in terms of scientific potential, ESA decided to fly Jupiter Icy Moons Explorer (JUICE) as its L1 mission. One of the main concerns was that the LISA Pathfinder mission had been experiencing technical delays, making it uncertain if the technology would be ready for the projected L1 launch date.

Soon afterwards, ESA announced it would be selecting themes for its Large class L2 and L3 mission slots. A theme called the 'Gravitational Universe' was formulated with the reduced NGO rechristened eLISA as a straw-man mission. In November 2013, ESA announced that it selected the 'Gravitational Universe' for its L3 mission slot (expected launch in 2034). Following the successful detection of gravitational waves by the LIGO, ground-based detectors in September 2015, NASA expressed interest in rejoining the mission as a junior partner. In response to an ESA call for mission proposals for the 'Gravitational Universe' themed L3 mission, a mission proposal for a detector with three 2.5-million-kilometre arms again called LISA was submitted in January 2017. On 20 June 2017, the suggested mission received its clearance goal for the 2030s, and was approved as one of the main research missions of ESA.

=== Development ===
On 25 January 2024, the LISA Mission was formally adopted by ESA, marking the transition from conceptual design to hardware development. As part of its renewed participation, NASA is contributing laser systems, telescopes, and charge management devices, all critical for detecting gravitational waves. This adoption reflects that the mission's technology is now sufficiently advanced to begin full-scale construction of the spacecraft and instruments. In March 2024, NASA and ESA signed a Memorandum of Understanding (MoU), officially defining NASA's role in supplying key mission components. As of January 2024, LISA was expected to launch in 2035 on an Ariane 6, two years earlier than previously announced.

In 2025, NASA's participation in LISA came into question again after the Republican administration released a budget request for NASA for the fiscal year 2026, which included drastic cuts to the agency's science programmes. However, the Congress didn’t agree and instead funded LISA at $80.5 million for FY2026 and again passed FY2027 appropriations also for a similar budget allocation. ESA's Director of Science Carole Mundell announced that LISA was among three ESA missions (together with EnVision and NewAthena) most impacted by this potential budget reduction on the US side and that "recovery actions" would be required. However, preparations on the European side continued steadily and in June 2025, ESA and OHB System AG signed their agreement to finalise the design of three spacecraft and begin their construction. This started the industrial development of the mission. Later in June 2025, Thales Alenia Space has signed a contract with OHB System AG for the development of multiple key elements of LISA. The expected 2035 launch date remained unchanged.

In January 2026, Thales Alenia Space has signed a contract with OHB System AG to provide the Propulsion Subsystem for LISA. On 5 May 2026, ESA awarded Thales Alenia Space a contract to begin the first phase of development of six optical telescopes for the mission. These telescopes were planned to be delivered by NASA's Goddard Space Flight Center, but the budgetary uncertainty caused by the Space policy of the second Trump administration forced ESA to start preparing mitigation efforts, such as alternative contracts for the telescopes.

== Detection principle ==
View of amplified effects of a + polarised gravitational wave (stylized) on LISA laser beams / arms paths

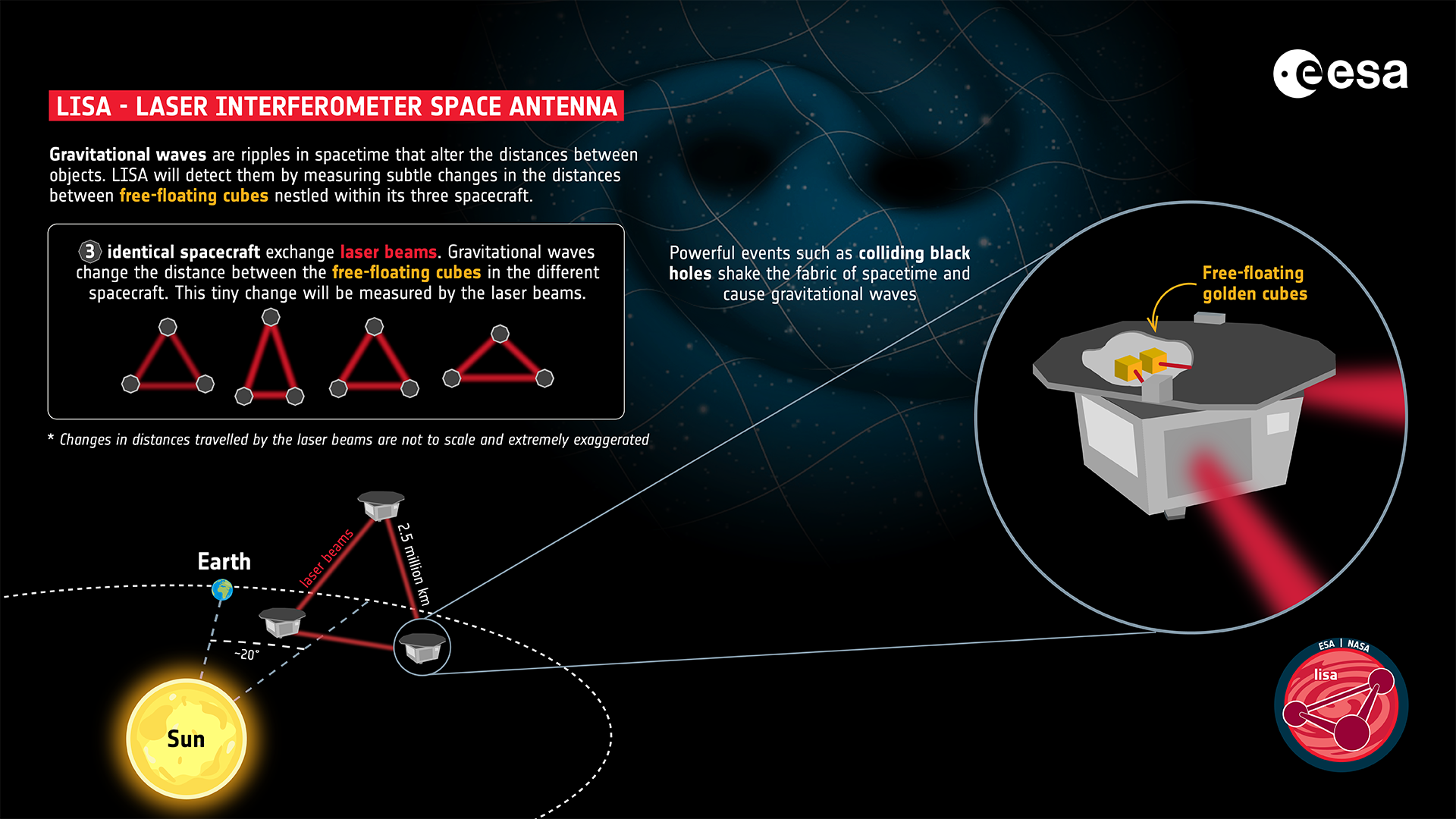
Three spacecraft in triangular formation with each spacecraft carrying a pair of solid gold-platinum cubes free-floating in special housings for detecting tiny changes in distances between cubes.

Like most modern gravitational wave-observatories, LISA is based on laser interferometry. Its three satellites form a giant Michelson interferometer in which two "transponder" satellites play the role of reflectors and one "master" satellite the roles of source and observer. When a gravitational wave passes the interferometer, the lengths of the two LISA arms vary due to spacetime distortions caused by the wave. Practically, LISA measures a relative phase shift between one local laser and one distant laser by light interference. Comparison between the observed laser beam frequency (in return beam) and the local laser beam frequency (sent beam) encodes the wave parameters. The principle of laser-interferometric inter-satellite ranging measurements was successfully implemented in the Laser Ranging Interferometer onboard GRACE Follow-On.

Unlike terrestrial gravitational-wave observatories, LISA cannot keep its arms "locked" in position at a fixed length. Instead, the distances between satellites vary significantly over each year's orbit, and the detector must keep track of the constantly changing distance, counting the millions of wavelengths by which the distance changes each second. Then, the signals are separated in the frequency domain: changes with periods of less than a day are signals of interest, while changes with periods of a month or more are irrelevant.

This difference means that LISA cannot use high-finesse Fabry–Pérot resonant arm cavities and signal recycling systems like terrestrial detectors, limiting its length-measurement accuracy. But with arms almost a million times longer, the motions to be detected are correspondingly larger.

== Science goals ==
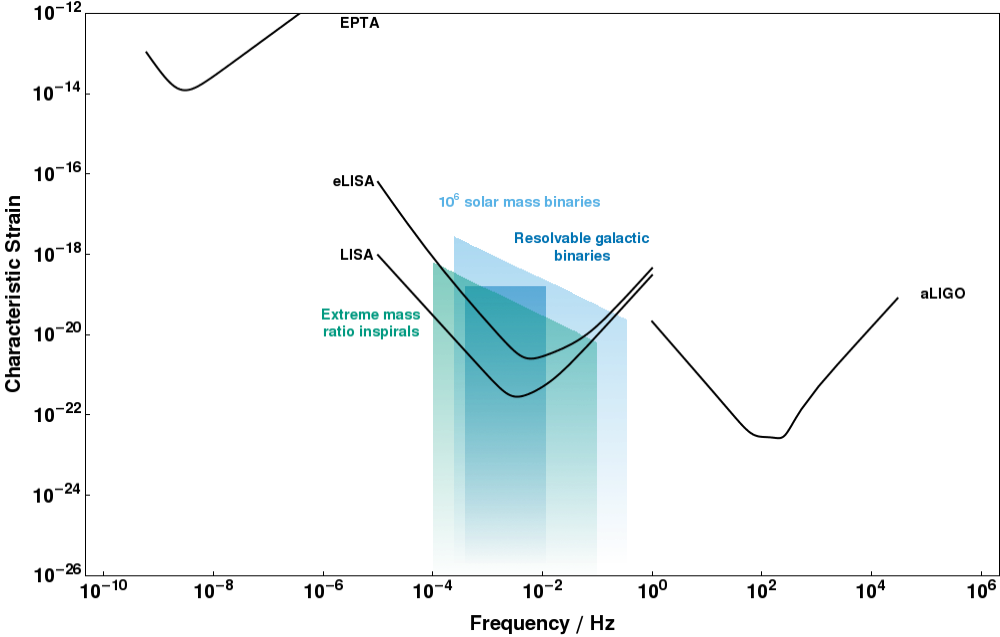
Detector noise curves for LISA and eLISA as a function of frequency. They lie in between the bands for ground-based detectors like Advanced LIGO (aLIGO) and pulsar timing arrays such as the European Pulsar Timing Array (EPTA). The characteristic strain of potential astrophysical sources are also shown. To be detectable the characteristic strain of a signal must be above the noise curve.

Gravitational-wave astronomy seeks to use direct measurements of gravitational waves to study astrophysical systems and to test Einstein's theory of gravity. Indirect evidence of gravitational waves was derived from observations of the decreasing orbital periods of several binary pulsars, such as the Hulse–Taylor pulsar. In February 2016, the Advanced LIGO project announced that it had directly detected gravitational waves from a black hole merger.

Observing gravitational waves requires two things: a strong source of gravitational waves—such as the merger of two black holes—and extremely high detection sensitivity. A LISA-like instrument should be able to measure relative displacements with a resolution of 20 picometres—less than the diameter of a helium atom—over a distance of a million kilometres, yielding a strain sensitivity of better than 1 part in 10^{20} in the low-frequency band about a millihertz.

A LISA-like detector is sensitive to the low-frequency band of the gravitational-wave spectrum, which contains many astrophysically interesting sources. Such a detector would observe signals from binary stars within our galaxy (the Milky Way); signals from binary supermassive black holes in other galaxies; and extreme-mass-ratio inspirals and bursts produced by a stellar-mass compact object orbiting a supermassive black hole. There are also more speculative signals such as signals from cosmological phase transitions, cosmic strings and primordial gravitational waves generated during cosmological inflation.

=== Galactic compact binaries ===
LISA will be able to detect the nearly monochromatic gravitational waves emanating from close binaries consisting of two compact stellar objects (white dwarfs, neutron stars, and black holes) in the Milky Way. At low frequencies these are actually expected to be so numerous that they form a source of (foreground) noise for LISA data analysis. At higher frequencies LISA is expected to detect and resolve around 25,000 galactic compact binaries. Studying the distribution of the masses, periods, and locations of this population, will teach us about the formation and evolution of binary systems in the galaxy. Furthermore, LISA will be able to resolve 10 binaries currently known from electromagnetic observations (and find ≈500 more with electromagnetic counterparts within one square degree). Joint study of these systems will allow inference on other dissipation mechanisms in these systems, e.g. through tidal interactions. One of the currently known binaries that LISA will be able to resolve is the white dwarf binary ZTF J1539+5027 with a period of 6.91 minutes, the second shortest period binary white dwarf pair discovered to date.

=== Planets of compact binaries ===
LISA will also be able to detect the presence of large planets and brown dwarfs orbiting white dwarf binaries. The number of such detections in the Milky Way is estimated to range from 17 in a pessimistic scenario to more than 2000 in an optimistic scenario, and even extragalactic detections in the Magellanic Clouds might be possible, far beyond the current capabilities of other detection methods for exoplanets.

=== Massive black hole mergers ===
LISA will be able to detect the gravitational waves from the merger of a pair of massive black holes with a chirp mass between 10^{4} and 10^{7} solar masses all the way back to their earliest formation at redshift around z ≈ 10. The most conservative population models expect at least a few such events to happen each year. For mergers closer by (z < 3), it will be able to determine the spins of the components, which carry information about the past evolution of the components (e.g. whether they have grown primarily through accretion or mergers). For mergers around the peak of star formation (z ≈ 2) LISA will be able to locate mergers within 100 square degrees on the night sky at least 24 hours before the actual merger, allowing electromagnetic telescopes to search for counterparts, with the potential of witnessing the formation of a quasar after a merger.

=== Extreme mass ratio inspirals ===
Extreme mass ratio inspirals (EMRIs) consist of a stellar compact object (<60 solar masses) on a slowly decaying orbit around a massive black hole of around 10^{5} solar masses. For the ideal case of a prograde orbit around a (nearly) maximally spinning black hole, LISA will be able to detect these events up to z=4. EMRIs are interesting because they are slowly evolving, spending around 10^{5} orbits and between a few months and a few years in the LISA sensitivity band before merging. This allows very accurate (up to an error of 1 in 10^{4}) measurements of the properties of the system, including the mass and spin of the central object and the mass and orbital elements (eccentricity and inclination) of the smaller object. EMRIs are expected to occur regularly in the centres of most galaxies, where a central massive black hole is frequently embedded within a dense nuclear star cluster. The co-existence of these two central massive objects was quantified in 2009, and a scaling relation between the mass of the supermassive black hole and the mass of the host nuclear star cluster was discovered in 2016. Because the nuclear star cluster acts as the reservoir of compact objects that spiral into the black hole, these mass scaling relations are vital for accurately predicting EMRI event rates. Conservative population estimates predict at least one detectable event per year for LISA.

=== Intermediate mass black hole binaries ===
LISA will also be able to detect the gravitational waves emanating from black hole binary mergers where the lighter black hole is in the intermediate black hole range (between 10^{2} and 10^{4} solar masses). In the case of both components being intermediate black holes between 600 and 10^{4} solar masses, LISA will be able to detect events up to redshifts around 1. In the case of an intermediate mass black hole spiralling into a massive black hole (between 10^{4} and 10^{6} solar masses) events will be detectable up to at least z=3. Since little is known about the population of intermediate mass black holes, there is no good estimate of the event rates for these events.

=== Multi-band gravitational wave astronomy ===
Following the announcement of the first gravitational wave detection, GW150914, it was realised that a similar event would be detectable by LISA well before the merger. Based on the LIGO estimated event rates, it is expected that LISA will detect and resolve about 100 binaries that would merge a few weeks to months later in the LIGO detection band. LISA will be able to accurately predict the time of merger ahead of time and locate the event with 1 square degree on the sky. This will greatly aid the possibilities for searches for electromagnetic counterpart events.

=== Fundamental black hole physics ===
Gravitational wave signals from black holes could provide hints at a more fundamental theory of gravity. LISA will be able to test possible modifications of Einstein's general theory of relativity, motivated by dark energy or dark matter. These could manifest, for example, through modifications of the propagation of gravitational waves, or through the possibility of hairy black holes.

=== Probe expansion of the universe ===
LISA will be able to independently measure the redshift and distance of events occurring relatively close by (z < 0.1) through the detection of massive black hole mergers and EMRIs. Consequently, it can make an independent measurement of the Hubble parameter H_{0} that does not depend on the use of the cosmic distance ladder. The accuracy of such a determination is limited by the sample size and therefore the mission duration. With a mission lifetime of 4 years one expects to be able to determine H_{0} with an absolute error of 2%. At larger ranges LISA events can (stochastically) be linked to electromagnetic counterparts, to further constrain the expansion curve of the universe.

=== Gravitational wave background ===
LISA will be sensitive to the stochastic gravitational wave background generated in the early universe through various channels, including inflation, first-order cosmological phase transitions related to spontaneous symmetry breaking, and cosmic strings.

=== Exotic sources ===
LISA will also search for currently unknown (and unmodelled) sources of gravitational waves. The history of astrophysics has shown that whenever a new frequency range/medium of detection is available new unexpected sources show up. This could for example include kinks and cusps in cosmic strings.

=== Memory effects ===
LISA will be sensitive to the permanent displacement induced on probe masses by gravitational waves, known as gravitational memory effect.

== LISA Pathfinder ==
An ESA test mission called LISA Pathfinder (LPF) was launched in 2015 to test the technology necessary to put a test mass in almost perfect free fall conditions. LPF consists of a single spacecraft with one of the LISA interferometer arms shortened to about 38 cm (15 in), so that it fits inside a single spacecraft. The spacecraft reached its operational location in heliocentric orbit at the Lagrange point L1 on 22 January 2016, where it underwent payload commissioning. Scientific research started on 8 March 2016. The goal of LPF was to demonstrate a noise level 10 times worse than needed for LISA. However, LPF exceeded this goal by a large margin, approaching the LISA requirement noise levels.

== Other gravitational-wave experiments ==
Simplified operation of a gravitational wave observatory Figure 1: A beamsplitter (green line) splits coherent light (from the white box) into two beams which reflect off the mirrors (cyan oblongs); only one outgoing and reflected beam in each arm is shown, and separated for clarity. The reflected beams recombine and an interference pattern is detected (purple circle). Figure 2: A gravitational wave passing over the left arm (yellow) changes its length and thus the interference pattern.

Other gravitational wave antennas, such as LIGO, Virgo, and GEO600, are already in operation on Earth, but their sensitivity at low frequencies is limited by the largest practical arm lengths, by seismic noise, and by interference from nearby moving masses. Conversely, NANOGrav measures frequencies too low for LISA. The different types of gravitational wave measurement systems — LISA, NANOGrav, and ground-based detectors — are complementary rather than competitive, much like astronomical observatories in different electromagnetic bands (e.g., ultraviolet and infrared).

== See also ==
- Beyond Einstein program – NASA program
- Big Bang Observer – proposed LISA successor
- Cosmic Vision program – ESA program
- Deci-hertz Interferometer Gravitational wave Observatory (DECIGO) – proposed Japanese space based gravitational-wave observatory
- List of European Space Agency programmes and missions
- Satellite formation flying
