= ZTF J153932.16+502738.8 =

Double binary white dwarf star

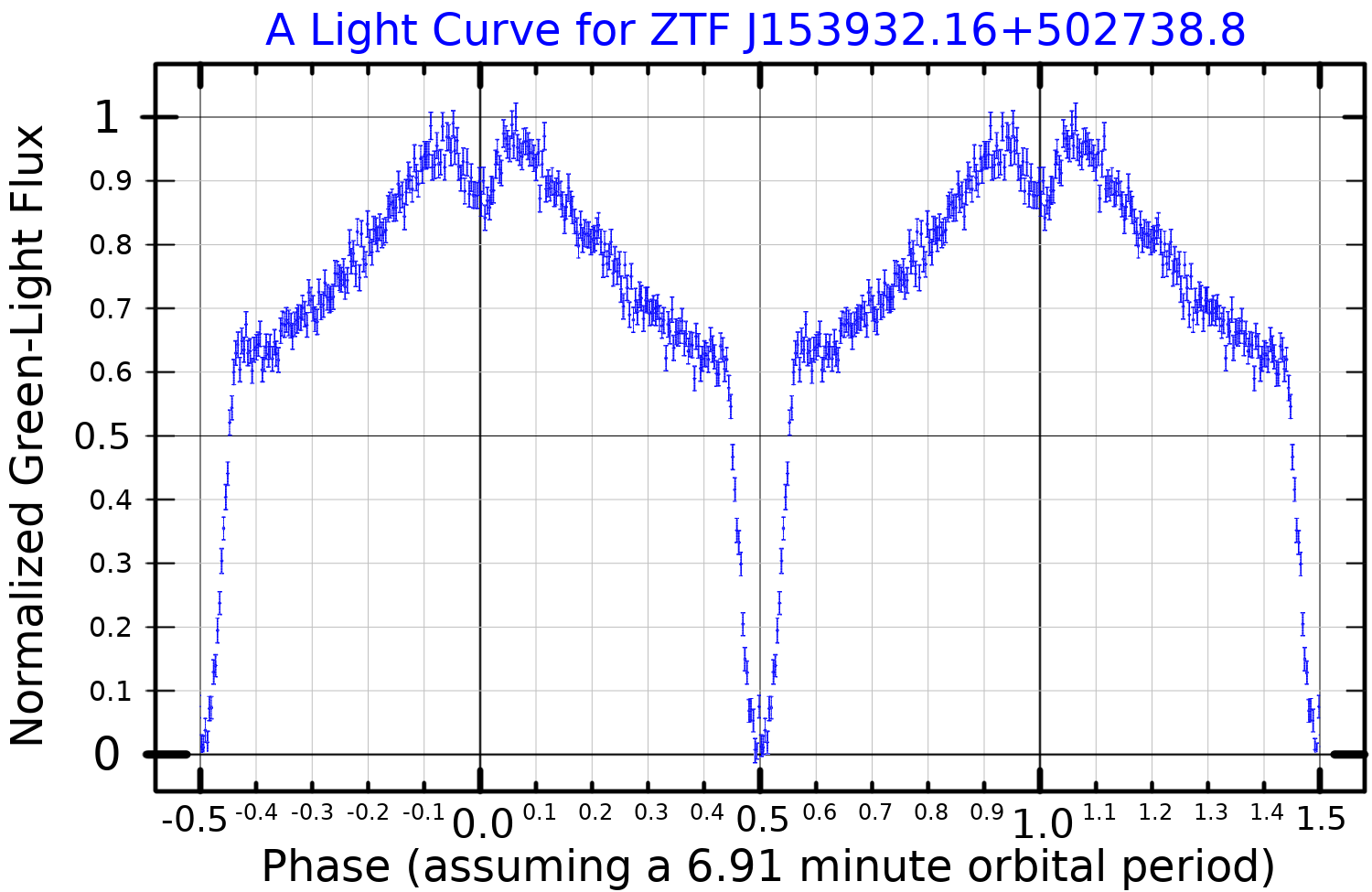
- A green band light curve for ZTF J153932.16+502738.8, adapted from Burdge et al. (2019)

Observation data Epoch J2000 Equinox ICRS
- Constellation: Boötes
- Right ascension: 15^{h} 39^{m} 32.1588^{s}
- Declination: +50° 27′ 38.783″

Characteristics
- Evolutionary stage: white dwarf
- Spectral type: DA

Astrometry
Radial velocity (R_{v})	82.4 km/s
Proper motion (μ)	RA: −3.413±1.530 mas/yr Dec.: −3.823±1.576 mas/yr
Distance	8000 ly

Orbit
Primary	A
Name	B
Period (P)	414.7915404±0.0000029 s
Semi-major axis (a)	0.11218+0.00080 −0.00082 R_{☉}
Inclination (i)	84.15+0.64 −0.57°

Details

ZTF J1539+5027 A
Mass	0.610+0.017 −0.022 M_{☉}
Radius	0.01562±0.00038 R_{☉}
Surface gravity (log g)	7.75±0.06 cgs
Temperature	48900±900 K

ZTF J1539+5027 B
Mass	0.210+0.014 −0.015 M_{☉}
Radius	0.03140+0.00054 −0.00052 R_{☉}
Temperature	<10000 K

Other designations
- SDSS J153932.15+502738.9, Gaia DR2 1402814555998561280

Database references
SIMBAD	data

ZTF J153932.16+502738.8 is a double binary white dwarf with an orbital period of just 6.91 minutes. Its period has been observed to be decreasing, due to the emission of gravitational waves. It is both an eclipsing binary and a double-lined spectroscopic binary. The hotter white dwarf is 48,900 K, and the other one is significantly cooler (<10,000K). The stars may merge into one in 130,000 years, or if mass transfers between them, they may separate again. Their distance from Earth is estimated at 2.3 kpc.

== Stars ==
The brighter star has an effective temperature of 48,900 K, a logarithm of surface gravity of 7.75, and a mass 0.6 times the Sun. Its radius is 0.0156 that of the Sun. The dimmer star is cooler, with a temperature of under 10,000 K, and has a mass 0.21 that of the Sun. It is physically larger than the brighter star at 0.0314 the radius of the Sun.

== Name ==
ZTF stands for Zwicky Transient Facility. This is a survey of the whole northern sky recording light curves that uses Samuel Oschin Telescope at Palomar Observatory.

== Eclipse ==
The light curve shows eclipses. One dip in the light curve is 15%, and the other is close to 100%. This means that one star is much brighter than the other. The light curve is not flat between eclipses, as the bright star is lighting up the face of the dim star.

== Orbital decay ==
The orbital period is decreasing at 2.373×10^{−11} seconds per second giving a characteristic timescale of 210,000 years. This decay is mostly due to the emission of gravitational waves, however 7% of the decay could be due to tidal losses. The decay is predicted to go for 130,000 years when the orbital period should reach 5 minutes. Then the dimmer star is predicted to expand and lose mass to the more massive star. It could then become an AM CVn system or merge to make a R Coronae Borealis star.

The orbit compares with V407 Vulpeculae with a 9.5 minute orbit, and HM Cancri with 5.4 minute orbit.

== Star composition ==
The hot star is a hydrogen-rich white dwarf of type DA. It has wide and shallow absorption lines of hydrogen. The dim star has narrow hydrogen emission lines, showing it is cooler. There are also helium absorption and emission lines. The two kinds of lines vary over the period, so that they can be identified with the two components. The emission lines are likely due to excess heating of the dim star by the bright one.
