= Constellation-X Observatory =

NASA mission concept

The Constellation-X Observatory (Con-X or HTXS) was a mission concept for an X-ray space observatory to be operated by NASA; in 2008 it was merged with ESA and JAXA efforts in the same direction to produce the International X-ray Observatory project, announced on 24 July 2008.

The intention of the Con-X project was to provide enough X-ray collecting area to be able to feed a spectroscope of substantially higher resolution than the previous generation (XMM-Newton, Chandra X-ray Observatory and Suzaku) of space-based X-ray telescopes; this would allow the resolution of individual hot-spots at the event horizon of black holes, of warm intergalactic matter (by seeing absorption lines at various redshifts superposed onto the spectra of background quasars) and of dynamics within galaxy clusters.

== Technology for Con-X ==
The project intended to have separate low-energy and high-energy X-ray telescopes, to work from 100eV to 40keV spectrum. The collecting area requirements would have been achieved using a segmented-mirror technique based on slumping thin (400 μm) glass sheets onto mandrels, which avoids the handling problems of dealing with whole thin shells. Dispersive optics for the spectrometer were developed, as well as a microcalorimeter-array detector providing energy resolution per pixel of about 5eV.

== The International X-ray Observatory (IXO) ==
In May 2008, ESA and NASA established a coordination group involving ESA, NASA and JAXA, with the intent of exploring a joint mission merging the ongoing XEUS and Constellation-X efforts. The coordination group met twice, first in May 2008 at European Space Research and Technology Centre (ESTEC), then in June 2008 at the Center for Astrophysics. As a result of these meetings a joint understanding was reached by the coordination group on a proposal to proceed towards the goal of developing an International X-ray Observatory (IXO). The coordination group proposed the start of a joint study of IXO. A single merged set of top level science goals and derived key science measurement requirements were established.
