= SPRITE (spacecraft) =

Proposed NASA Saturn atmospheric probe mission concept

- Names: Saturn PRobe Interior and aTmospheric Explorer
- Mission type: Atmospheric probe
- Operator: NASA
- Mission duration: Cruise: 10 years (planned)

Spacecraft properties
- Spacecraft: SPRITE
- Spacecraft type: Atmospheric probe
- Bus: CRSC
- Dimensions: Atmospheric probe: 86.7 x 53.6 cm

Start of mission
- Launch date: November 2024 (proposed)
- Rocket: Atlas V 401 (proposed)
- Launch site: Cape Canaveral, SLC-41
- Contractor: United Launch Alliance (ULA)

Saturn atmospheric probe
- Spacecraft component: Atmospheric probe
- Atmospheric entry: November 2034 (proposed)

Flyby of Saturn
- Spacecraft component: CRSC
- Closest approach: November 2034 (proposed)
- Distance: ≈100 000 km

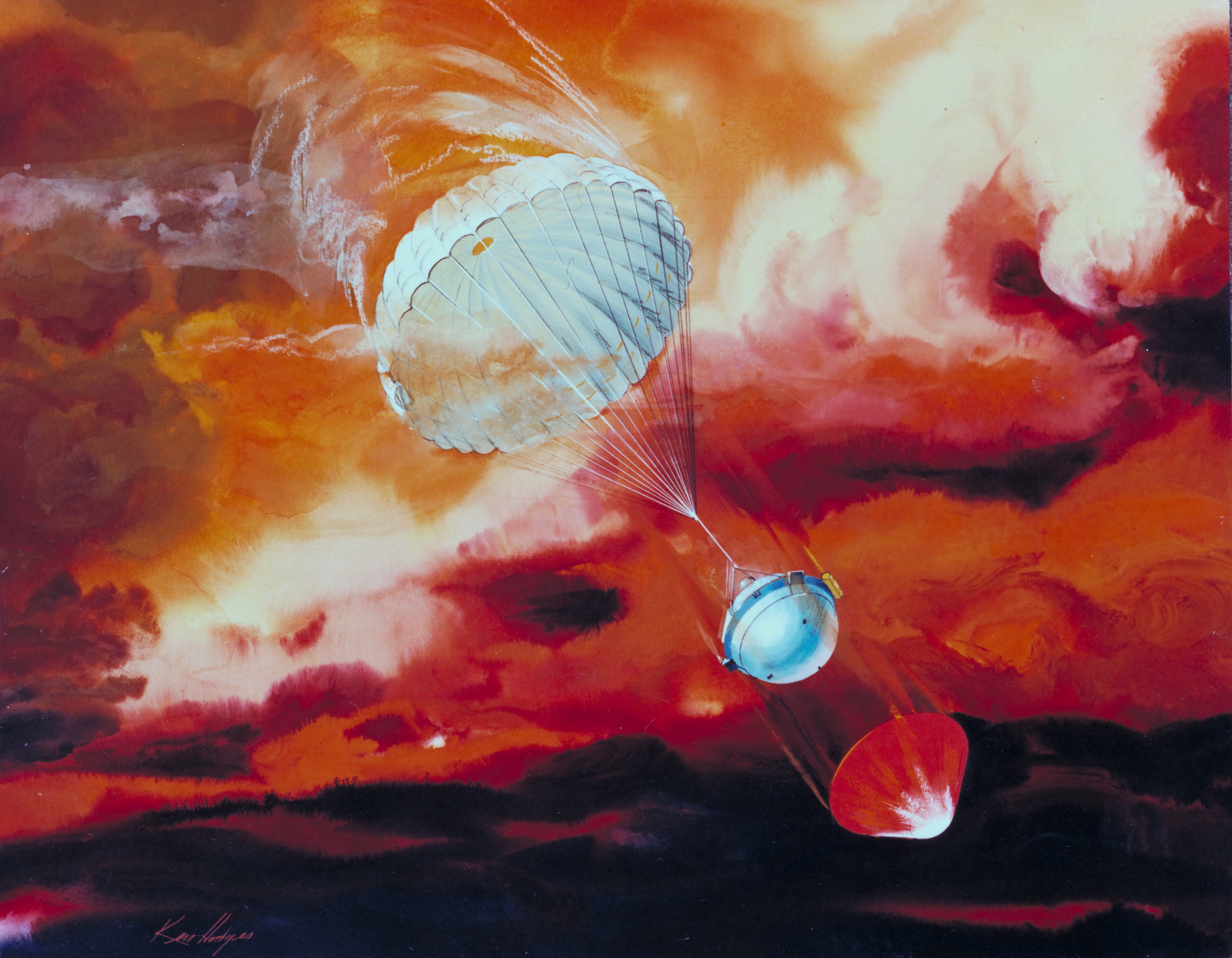
For comparison, artwork for Galileo Probe which penetrated Jupiter's atmosphere in the 1990s

SPRITE (Saturn PRobe Interior and aTmospheric Explorer) was a proposed Saturn atmospheric probe mission concept of the NASA. SPRITE is a design for an atmospheric entry probe that would travel to Saturn from Earth on its own cruise stage, then enter the atmosphere of Saturn, and descend taking measurements in situ.

== Overview ==
Many fundamental questions about Saturn have not have been fully investigated at the end of the Cassini mission in September 2017, because of limitations in its implementation and science instrumentation. Direct measurements of the atmospheric structure and noble gas and elemental abundances of Saturn are needed to distinguish between competing models of Solar System formation, as well as to provide an improved context for exoplanet systems. The SPRITE probe would revolutionize our understanding of Saturn's atmospheric structure and composition, and allow better understanding of extrasolar giant planets.

SPRITE was proposed by Caltech's Jet Propulsion Laboratory with as principal investigator Amy Simon at NASA's Goddard Space Flight Center.

== New Frontiers Proposal ==
The SPRITE mission concept was proposed in 2016 as a mission to be funded as NASA's New Frontiers program mission 4, but it was not selected for development. The final mission selection was the Dragonfly mission to Titan, with the CAESAR comet sample return mission selected for study, but not selected as the final choice.

The way that program works, it may be resubmitted in another selection process. New Frontiers is larger size mission with fewer opportunities, which started with the New Horizons's probe to Pluto and beyond with mission exceeding US1 billion.

== Goals ==
The 2013–2022 Planetary Science Decadal Survey identified a Saturn probe mission as a high priority mission target for the NASA New Frontiers program due to the need for in situ measurements to depths of 10 bars or more. The SPRITE team explains that "to develop an improved understanding of the formation, evolution, and structure of the Solar System, it is essential that the role played by the giant planets be well understood, and this cannot be accomplished without in situ measurements of the composition, structure, dynamics, and processes of Saturn's atmosphere". In order to accomplish this, the mission scientists have set two main goals:

- Collect and analyze evidence of Saturn’s formation and early evolution.
  - Obtain a chemical inventory of Saturn's troposphere to distinguish between competing planet formation models and extent of migration in the early Solar System
  - Constrain Saturn's helium depletion to reconcile observed temperatures with thermal evolution models
- Reveal the truth beneath Saturn's clouds.
  - Measure Saturn's in situ atmospheric chemistry to validate condensation models and to interpret remotely observed composition
  - Perform in situ characterization of Saturn's tropospheric cloud structure to provide the ground truth basis for cloud retrieval models
  - Determine Saturn's in situ 3-D atmospheric dynamics in one location to bound global circulation and analytical models of the time-variable cloud top motions

== Spacecraft ==
Saturn in natural color, photographed by Cassini in July 2008

The SPRITE mission concept consists of a Carrier Relay Spacecraft (CRSC) and an entry probe that descends to at least ten bars. The descent strategy calls for using a heat shield followed by a parachute that would permit up to two hours for the probe to collect data. The probe would provide direct measurement of composition and atmospheric structure (including dynamics) along the probe descent path, providing science that is not accessible to remote sensing measurements.

The solar powered CRSC would carry a multi-channel imager for pre-entry imaging of the location, and to provide global context imaging for the probe measurements. The CSRC module would not orbit Saturn, but would flyby Saturn once to relay the probe's scientific data back to Earth multiple times through the Deep Space Network.

== Payload ==
The proposed SPRITE atmospheric entry probe would carry a scientific instrument payload to measure Saturn's atmospheric structure, dynamics, composition, chemistry, and clouds to at least 10 bars.

The conceptual payload consists of two spectrometers: a quadrupole mass spectrometer would measure noble gases and noble gas isotopes with extreme sensitivity. Of particular importance are measurements of helium (He), key to understanding Saturn's thermal evolution; and a tunable laser spectrometer that would measure molecular abundances and isotope ratios to determine the chemical structure of Saturn's atmosphere, and disequilibrium species such as carbon monoxide (CO), phosphine (PH_{3}) and ethane (C_{2}H_{6}) which can be used to infer Saturn's deep water abundance.

The Atmospheric Structure Instrument (ASI) would provide the pressure and temperature profile of Saturn's atmosphere to determine the altitude profile of static stability, and when combined with cloud measurements from the nephelometer, it would elucidate processes that determine the location and structure of Saturn's multiple cloud layers. The ASI also includes accelerometers to measure entry accelerations from which the probe entry and descent trajectory can be reconstructed and the thermal structure of the upper atmosphere characterized.

The Doppler Wind Experiment would provide a measure of the 3-dimensional dynamics of the Saturn atmosphere using an ultrastable oscillator, including the profile of local winds with depth and vertical motions from atmospheric waves.

== Launch and trajectory ==
SPRITE was proposed to be launch in late November 2024. The probe would follow Earth–Venus–Earth–Earth gravity assists and it would reach Saturn in November 2034. Atmospheric probe would separate from CRSC 30 days before entry. Imaging and observations would last for 6 days before entry. CRSC would flyby Saturn at the distance of approximately 100,000 km, continuing on solar escape trajectory.

== Objects that SPIRITE would visit ==
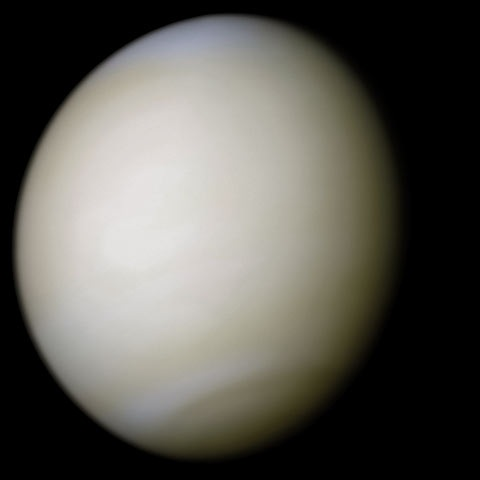
Venus (flyby)

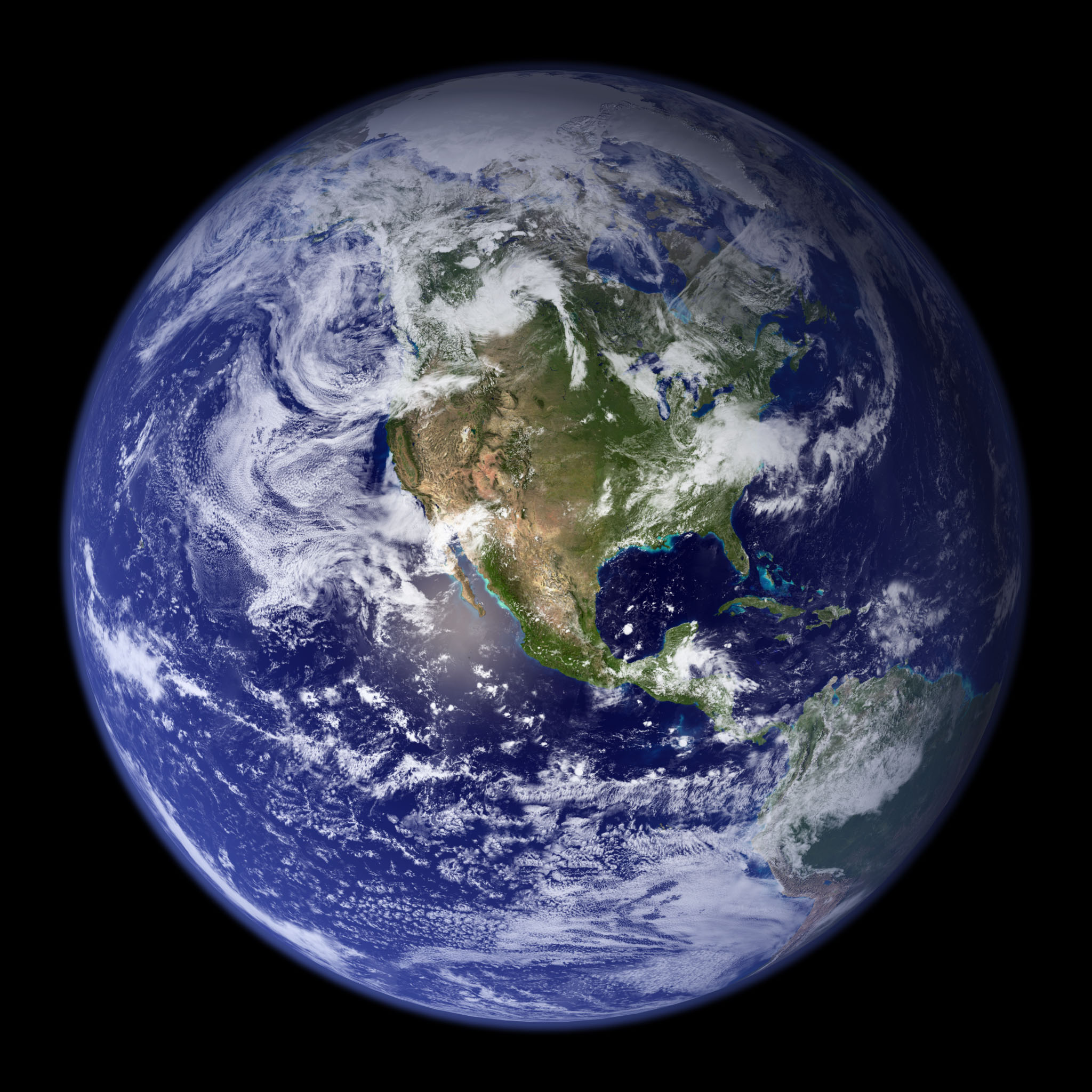
Earth (3 x flybys)

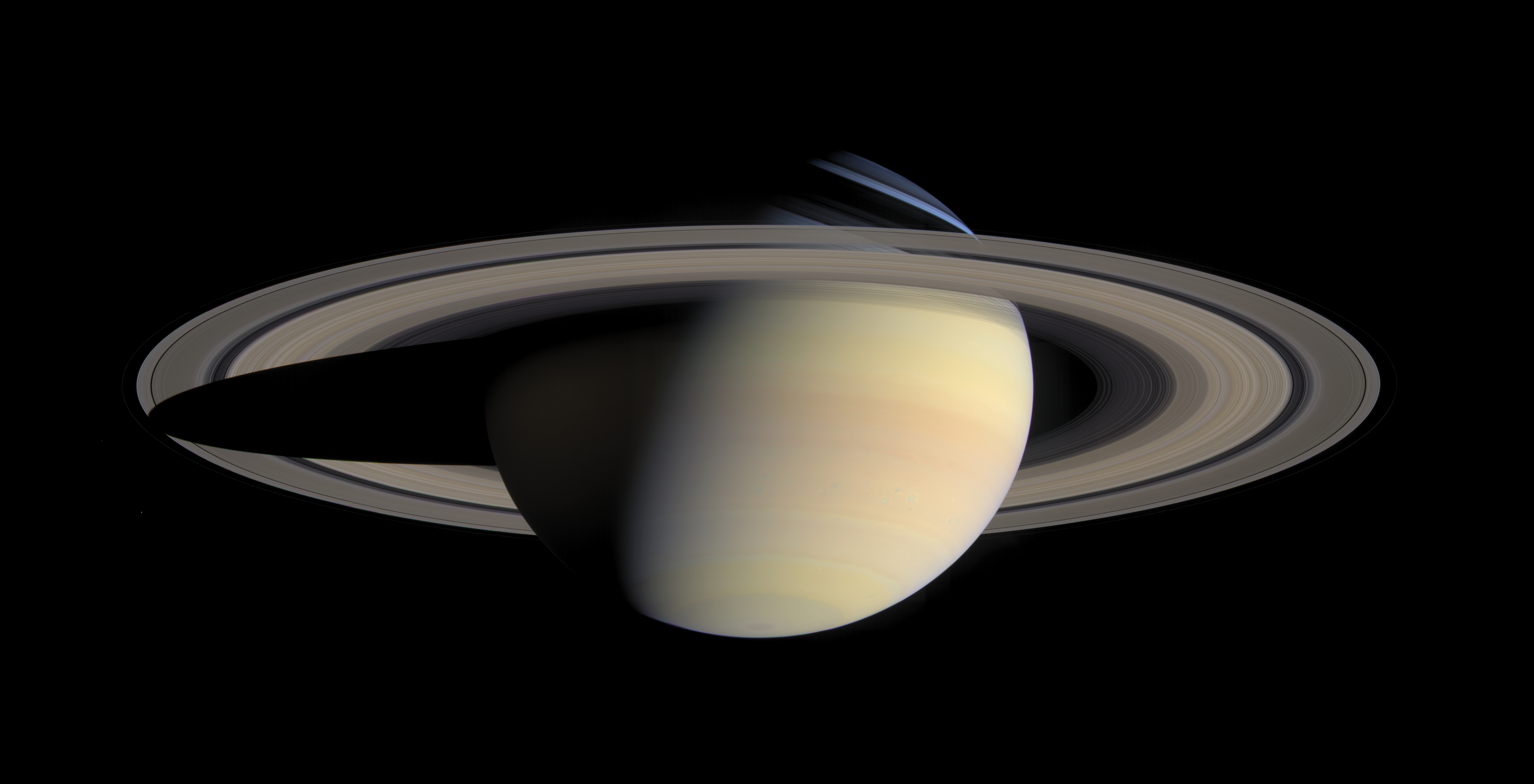
Saturn (flyby + atmospheric probe)

== See also ==
- Galileo Probe (Atmospheric entry probe for Jupiter, entered 1995)
- Pioneer Venus Multiprobe (Atmospheric entry probes for Venus, entered 1978)
- Huygens spacecraft (carried by Cassini orbiter to Saturn's moon Titan)
- Saturn Atmospheric Entry Probe (concept for similar spacecraft entry probe for Saturn)
- List of spacecraft powered by non-rechargeable batteries
