= Gerb =

Gerb may refer to:

- Gerb (pyrotechnic), a standard pyrotechnic device
- GERB, a Bulgarian political party
- Geostationary Earth Radiation Budget, a satellite instrument
- Yarden Gerbi (born 1989), nicknamed "Gerb", Israeli judoka
- Gerb, Catalonia, site of an 11th-century castle built by Ermengol IV, Count of Urgell
- Gerb, a race in the Star Wars universe
