= Yolanda Shea =

Research Physical Scientist

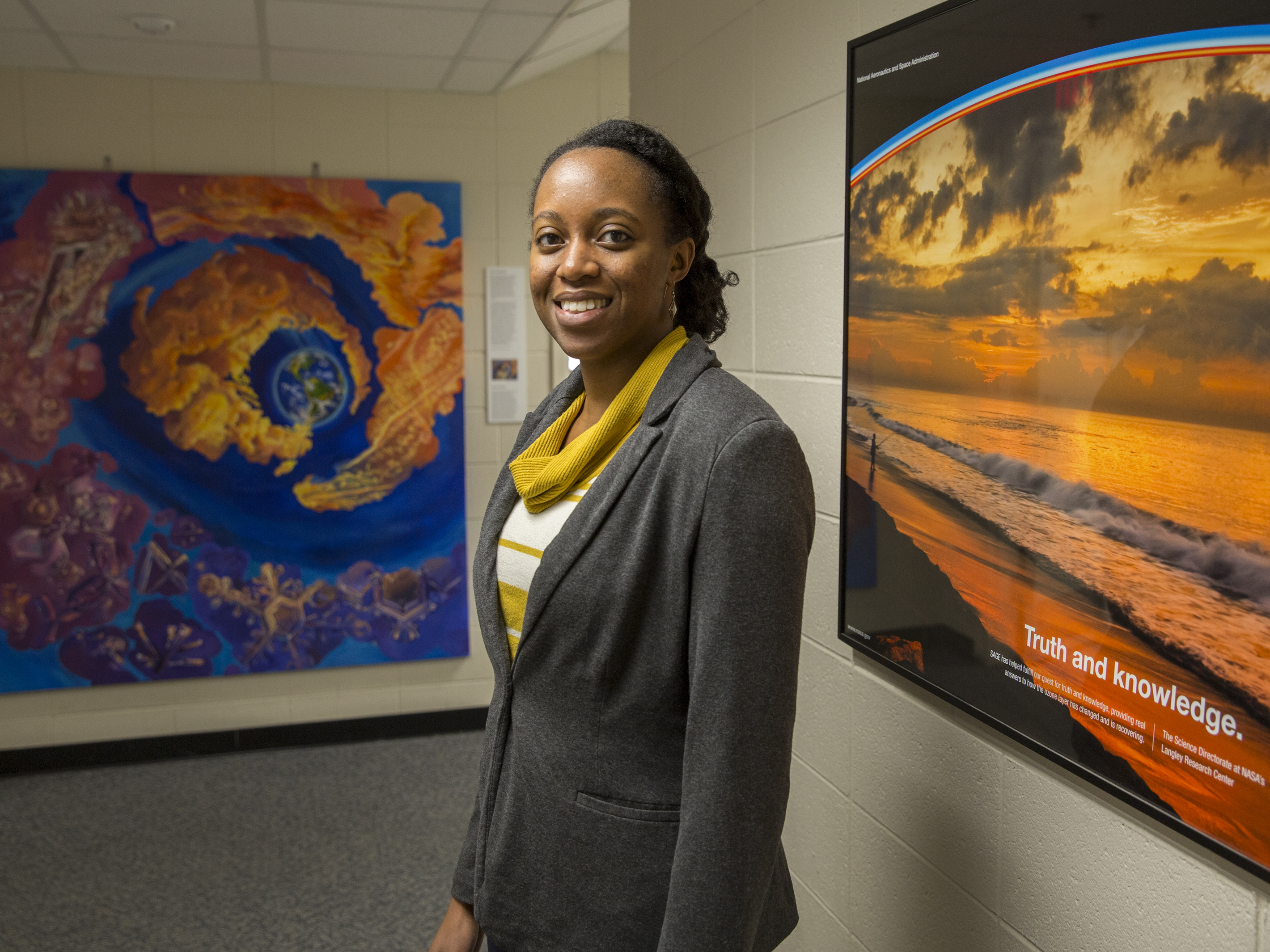
- Education: Cornell University (B.S.) University of Colorado at Boulder (Ph.D.)
- Known for: Shortwave Spectral Measurements
- Awards: Presidential Early Career Award for Scientists and Engineers (PECASE)
- Scientific career
- Workplaces: National Aeronautics and Space Administration (NASA)

Yolanda Shea is a Research Physical Scientist at NASA Langley Research Center in Hampton, Virginia. In 2019, Shea earned a Presidential Early Career Award for Scientists and Engineers (PECASE) for her work in pioneering shortwave spectral measurements.

== Early life and education ==
When Shea was young, she moved from Massachusetts to Virginia and was interested in the various pieces of information that meteorologists put together to make weather forecasts. Shea's interest in meteorology led to her exploration of other areas of atmospheric science and she went on to earn her bachelor's degree from Cornell University and her Ph.D. from the University of Colorado at Boulder in atmospheric science.

In the summer after Shea's junior year of college, she was an intern at Lockheed Martin Corporation where she worked on an algorithm that estimated ocean currents from satellite measurements. During graduate school, Shea became involved in Climate Absolute Radiance and Refractivity Observatory (CLARREO) which focuses on getting accurate climate data records for Earth.

== Career and research ==
Shea has worked for the National Aeronautics and Space Administration (NASA) since 2012 and has continued her work with CLARREO at NASA as the project scientist for the CLARREO Pathfinder mission. The mission includes attaching a payload to the International Space Station that measures the earth's albedo with higher accuracy. Her work centers on improving satellite accuracy to get a clearer picture of the earth's system and the changes occurring. Shea focuses on shortwave spectral measurements, measuring sunlight reflected by the earth to monitor changes in the climate system. Shea has also investigated how to increase the accuracy of satellite measurements used in making global climate models to detect changes in clouds, aerosols, and water vapor.

=== Awards and honors ===
On July 25, 2019, Shea received a PECASE, the highest honor given by the United States government to outstanding scientists and engineers. The award recognizes their potential for leadership in science and technology at the beginning of their independent research careers. Shea earned her PECASE for her work in shortwave spectral measurement.

=== Selected publications ===
- Spectrally Dependent CLARREO Infrared Spectrometer Calibration Requirement for Climate Change Detection (2017) Journal of Climate
- Quantifying the Dependence of Satellite Cloud Retrievals on Instrument Uncertainty (2017) Journal of Climate
- CLARREO Pathfinder/VIIRS Intercalibration: Quantifying the Polarization Effects on Reflectance and the Intercalibration Uncertainty (2019) Remote Sensing

=== Public engagement ===
Shea has been challenging the stereotype of what a scientist should look like and inspiring the next generation through outreach events. In 2015, Shea was featured on PBS Kids' SciGirls where she taught a group of students how to use Student Cloud Observations Online (S'COOL) to identify clouds from the ground to validate NASA satellite images. Shea reaches many students from underrepresented backgrounds by breaking the mold of the "successful scientist" stereotype.
