= Traceable Radiometry Underpinning Terrestrial and Helio Studies =

Canceled Earth observation satellite

TRUTHS
- Names: Traceable Radiometry Underpinning Terrestrial- and Helio-Studies
- Mission type: Solar radiation measurement, traceability
- Mission duration: 5-8+ years (planned)

Start of mission
- Launch date: ~2030 (proposed)
- Rocket: Vega-C (planned)
- Launch site: Centre Spatial Guyanais

Orbital parameters
- Reference system: Geocentric
- Regime: Polar
- Altitude: 610 km
- Inclination: 90°
- Period: 96.9 minutes
- Repeat interval: 61 days

Instruments
- CSAR - cryogenic solar absolute radiometer HIS - hyperspectral imaging spectrometer
- ESA insignia

TRUTHS (Traceable Radiometry Underpinning Terrestrial- and Helio-Studies) was a planned European Space Agency (ESA) satellite. It was meant to improve the accuracy, reliability, and integrity of Earth observation data, and to be the first of a new class of "SI-traceable satellites" (SITSats) that would have enabled other Earth observation missions to calibrate measurements with reference to them. The mission was led by the UK National Physical Laboratory (NPL) and its lead scientist for Earth observation, Nigel Fox. The UK Space Agency withdrew its funding for the project at the end of 2025, ending the satellite's development.

== Science goals ==
TRUTHS had two primary objectives:

- "Climate benchmarking through high-accuracy direct hyperspectral measurements of the Earth’s incoming and outgoing radiation to enhance our ability to estimate the Earth’s radiation budget by an order of magnitude, enabling detection of climate signals in the shortest possible time."
- "To establish a gold-standard reference dataset against which to cross-calibrate other sensors, facilitating an upgrade to the performance of the global Earth observing system to ensure interoperability and robust anchoring to an SI reference in space."

A secondary objective of the mission was to collect global hyperspectral data to "constrain and improve retrieval algorithms".

TRUTHS was projected to be ready for launch around 2030, aboard a Vega-C from the Guiana Space Centre. The mission had a targeted duration of five years, with consumables for up to eight years.

== Science instruments ==
Alongside communications and navigation equipment, the scientific payload of the satellite would have included three instruments: the cryogenic solar absolute radiometer (CSAR), the onboard calibration system (OBCS), and the hyperspectral imaging spectrometer (HIS).

The instruments would have produced global hyperspectral (320 nm to 2400 nm) measurements of "top-of-atmosphere earth spectral radiance (0.3% k=2); solar irradiance (both total and spectrally resolved, 0.02% and 0.3% respectively); and lunar spectral irradiance (0.3%)".

The cryogenic radiometer is the primary standard used by national metrology institutes for radiometric measurements and "recommended as the means to achieve SI traceability". The CSAR, which would be cooled to < 60 K, was therefore considered "the heart of the calibration system".

The mission would have been the first to host a primary standard cryogenic radiometer aboard a satellite. The OBCS would "...transfer calibration traceability from the SI defining power measurement... to a full spectrally resolved radiance calibration of an instrument" – in the case of TRUTHS from the CSAR to the HIS – in a simplified manner to the steps used by terrestrial metrology institutes. The HIS could then be used to image the Earth, the Moon, and also to "measure incident solar spectral irradiance."

== Timeline ==
- In order to obtain both scientific and financial support for the mission, many reports and academic publications were produced by Fox and collaborators over several decades.
- Early 2000s – Mission proposed by the UK National Physical Laboratory (NPL)
- 2019 – Adopted at the ESA ministerial conference, with 85% funding from the UK. The remainder from Switzerland, Greece, Czechia, and Romania.
- 2020 – Airbus UK selected as lead contractor, Teledyne e2v selected to provide the infrared detectors.
- 2021 – At COP26: Began early design phase.
- 2022 – Passed preliminary design, technical, and scientific reviews. Received further funding at the ESA ministerial conference.
- 2023 – Further funding awarded during COP28, to Airbus UK for design and development; and to Teledyne e2v to construct the hyperspectral imaging spectrometer detection system.
- 2025 – The UK Space Agency withdrew its funding, ending the satellite's development.

== See also ==
- List of European Space Agency programmes and missions
- CLARREO
