= Soil Moisture Active Passive =

NASA earth monitoring satellite

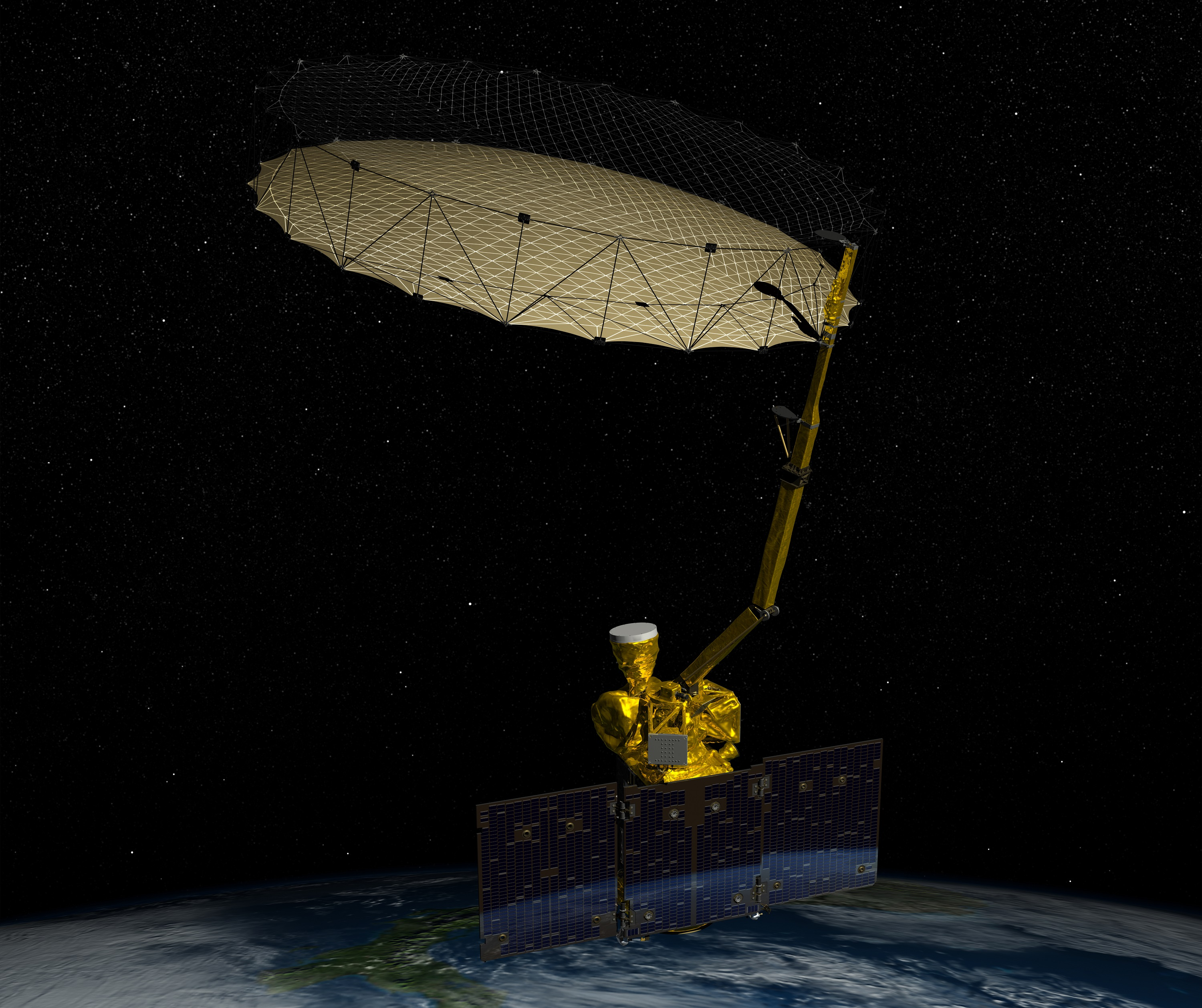
- An artist rendering of the Soil Moisture Active Passive spacecraft.
- Mission type: Earth observation
- Operator: NASA
- COSPAR ID: 2015-003A
- SATCAT no.: 40376
- Website: smap.jpl.nasa.gov
- Mission duration: 3 years (nominal); Elapsed: 11 years, 8 months, 3 days

Spacecraft properties
- Manufacturer: Jet Propulsion Laboratory
- Launch mass: 944 kg
- Payload mass: 79 kg
- Dimensions: 1.5 x 0.9 x 0.9 m
- Power: 1450 watts

Start of mission
- Launch date: 31 January 2015, 14:22 UTC
- Rocket: Delta II 7320-10C
- Launch site: Vandenberg, SLC-2W
- Contractor: United Launch Alliance
- Entered service: August 2015

Orbital parameters
- Reference system: Geocentric
- Regime: Sun-synchronous
- Perigee altitude: 680.9 km
- Apogee altitude: 683.5 km
- Inclination: 98.12°
- Period: 98.5 minutes
- Epoch: 15 October 2019, 23:39:39 UTC

An animation of SMAP's trajectory around Earth from 31 January 2015 to 19 August 2015: SMAP · Earth

Soil Moisture Active Passive (SMAP) is a NASA environmental monitoring satellite that measures soil moisture across the planet. It is designed to collect a global 'snapshot' of soil moisture every 2 to 3 days. With this frequency, changes from specific storms can be measured while also assessing impacts across seasons of the year. SMAP was launched on 31 January 2015. It was one of the first Earth observation satellites developed by NASA in response to the National Research Council's Decadal Survey.

NASA invested US$916 million in the design, development, launch, and operations of the program.

An early fault in a radar power supply limited the resolution of the radar data collected from 2015 onwards.

== Mission overview ==
SMAP provides measurements of the land surface soil moisture and freeze-thaw state with near-global revisit coverage in 2–3 days. SMAP surface measurements are coupled with hydrologic models to infer soil moisture conditions in the root zone. These measurements enable science applications users to:

1. Understand processes that link the terrestrial water, energy, and carbon cycles.
2. Estimate global water and energy fluxes at the land surface.
3. Quantify net carbon flux in boreal landscapes.
4. Enhance weather and climate forecast skill.
5. Develop improved flood prediction and drought monitoring capability.

SMAP observations are acquired for a period of at least three years after launch, and the 81 kg of propellant that it carries should allow the mission to operate well beyond its design lifetime. A comprehensive validation, science, and the application program are implemented, and all data are publicly available through the NASA archive centers.

== Status ==
In August 2015, scientists completed their initial calibration of the two instruments on board, however, SMAP's radar stopped transmitting 7 July due to an anomaly that was investigated by a team at JPL. The team identified the anomaly to the power supply for the radar's high-power amplifier. On 2 September 2015, NASA announced that the amplifier failure meant that the radar could no longer return data. The science mission continues with data being returned only by the radiometer instrument. SMAP's prime mission ended in June 2018. The 2017 Earth Science senior review endorsed the SMAP mission for continued operations through 2020, and preliminarily, through 2023.

== Measurement concept ==
The SMAP observatory includes a dedicated spacecraft and instrument suite in a near-polar, Sun-synchronous orbit. The SMAP measurement system consists of a radiometer (passive) instrument and a synthetic-aperture radar (active) instrument operating with multiple polarizations in the L-band range. The combined active and passive measurement approach takes advantage of the spatial resolution of the radar and the sensing accuracy of the radiometer.

The active and passive sensors provide coincident measurements of the surface-emission and backscatter. The instruments sense conditions in the top 5 cm of soil through moderate vegetation cover to yield globally mapped estimates of soil moisture and its freeze-thaw state.

The spacecraft orbits Earth once every 98.5 minutes and repeats the same ground track every eight days.

== Scientific payload ==
The satellite carries two scientific instruments: a radar and a radiometer, that share a single feed and deployable 6 m reflector antenna system, built by Northrop Grumman, that rotates around the nadir axis making conical scans of the surface. The wide swath provides near-global revisit every 2–3 days.

=== SMAP system characteristics ===
Characteristic	Radar	Radiometer
Frequency	1.2 GHz	1.41 GHz
Polarizations	VV, HH, HV	V, H, U
Resolution	1–3 km (Note: Over outer 70% of swath)	36 km
Antenna diameter	6 m	
Rotation rate	14,6 rpm	
Incidence angle	40°	
Swath width	1000 km	
Orbit	Near Polar, Sun-synchronous	
Local time des. node	06:00	
Local time asc. node	06:00	
Altitude	685 km	

=== Auxiliary Payloads ===
Educational Launch of Nanosatellite X (ELaNa X), consisting of three Poly Picosatellite Orbital Deployers containing four CubeSats (three CubeSat missions), mounted on the second stage of the Delta II launch vehicle:

- ExoCube, a space weather satellite developed by California Polytechnic State University, and sponsored by the National Science Foundation. Cal Poly designed the core-satellite bus, while the scientific payload is supplied by NASA's Goddard Space Flight Center. The University of Wisconsin, at Madison, and Scientific Solutions, Inc. (SSI) are developing the scientific objectives and providing guidance for instrument development. ExoCube measures the density of hydrogen, oxygen, helium, and nitrogen in Earth's upper atmosphere (exosphere and thermosphere) using direct mass spectroscopy measurements. The size of ExoCube is three CubeSat units, or 30 x 10 x 10 cm.
- GRIFEX, the Geo-cape Roic In-Flight performance Experiment, developed by the University of Michigan's Michigan Exploration Laboratory in partnership with NASA's Earth Science Technology Office and NASA's Jet Propulsion Laboratory. This is a technology validation mission that performs an engineering assessment of a JPL-developed all digital high-performance focal plane array consisting of an innovative in-pixel analog-to-digital readout integrated circuit. Its high throughput capacity enables the proposed Geostationary Coastal and Air Pollution Events (GEO-CAPE) satellite mission concept to make hourly high spatial and spectral resolution measurements of rapidly changing atmospheric chemistry and pollution with the Panchromatic Fourier Transform Spectrometer (PanFTS) instrument in development. GRIFEX advances the technology required for future space-borne measurements of atmospheric composition from geostationary orbit that are relevant to climate change, as well as future missions that require advanced detectors in support of the Earth Science Decadal Survey. The size of GRIFEX is three CubeSat units, or 30 x 10 x 10 cm.
- FIREBIRD-II (A and B), developed by the University of New Hampshire, Montana State University, Los Alamos National Laboratory, and the Aerospace Corporation. FIREBIRD-II is a two-CubeSat space weather project to resolve the spatial scale, size, and energy dependence of electron microbursts in the Van Allen radiation belts. Relativistic electron microbursts appear as short periods of intense electron precipitation measured by particle detectors on low-altitude spacecraft, seen when their orbits cross magnetic field lines that thread the outer radiation belt. FIREBIRD-II provides dual point radiation belt measurements that offer insight into electron acceleration and loss processes in the outer Van Allen radiation belt. Each of the FIREBIRD CubeSats is 1.5 CubeSat units in size, or 15 x 10 x 10 cm.

The CubeSat projects are deployed at a minimum of 2,896 seconds after the separation of the Soil Moisture Active Passive observatory, into a 440 x 670 km, 99.12° inclination orbit.

== Program description ==
SMAP is a directed mission of the National Aeronautics and Space Administration. The SMAP project is managed for NASA by the Jet Propulsion Laboratory, with participation by the Goddard Space Flight Center. SMAP builds on the heritage and risk reduction activities of NASA's cancelled ESSP Hydros Mission.

== Science and applications ==
SMAP observations are used to characterize hydrologic and ecosystem processes including land-atmosphere exchanges of water, energy, and carbon. Among the users of SMAP data are hydrologists, weather forecasters, climate scientists and agricultural and water resource managers. Additional users include fire hazard and flood disaster managers, disease control and prevention managers, emergency planners and policy makers. SMAP soil moisture and freeze-thaw information directly benefit several societal applications areas, including:

=== Weather and climate forecasting ===
Initialization of numerical weather prediction models and seasonal climate models with accurate soil moisture information extend forecast lead times and enhance prediction skill.

=== Drought ===
SMAP soil moisture information improves the monitoring and forecasting of drought conditions, enabling new capabilities for mitigating drought impacts.

=== Floods and landslides ===
Hydrologic forecast systems calibrated and initialized with high-resolution soil moisture fields lead to improved flood forecasts and provide essential information on the potential for landslides.

=== Human health ===
Improved seasonal soil moisture forecasts directly benefit famine early warning systems. Benefits also are realized through improved predictions of heat stress and virus spread rates, and improved disaster preparation and response.

== See also ==
- Soil Moisture and Ocean Salinity satellite
