= Saturn Atmospheric Entry Probe =

Proposed NASA mission to Saturn

- Mission type: Atmospheric probe
- Operator: NASA

Start of mission
- Launch date: August 30, 2027 (proposed)

Flyby of Earth
- Closest approach: July 16, 2030 (proposed)
- Distance: 300 km (190 mi)

Saturn atmospheric probe
- Spacecraft component: Atmospheric probe
- Atmospheric entry: June 22, 2034 (proposed)

Flyby of Saturn
- Spacecraft component: Carrier-relay spacecraft
- Closest approach: June 22, 2034 (proposed)
- Distance: ≈ 100 000 km

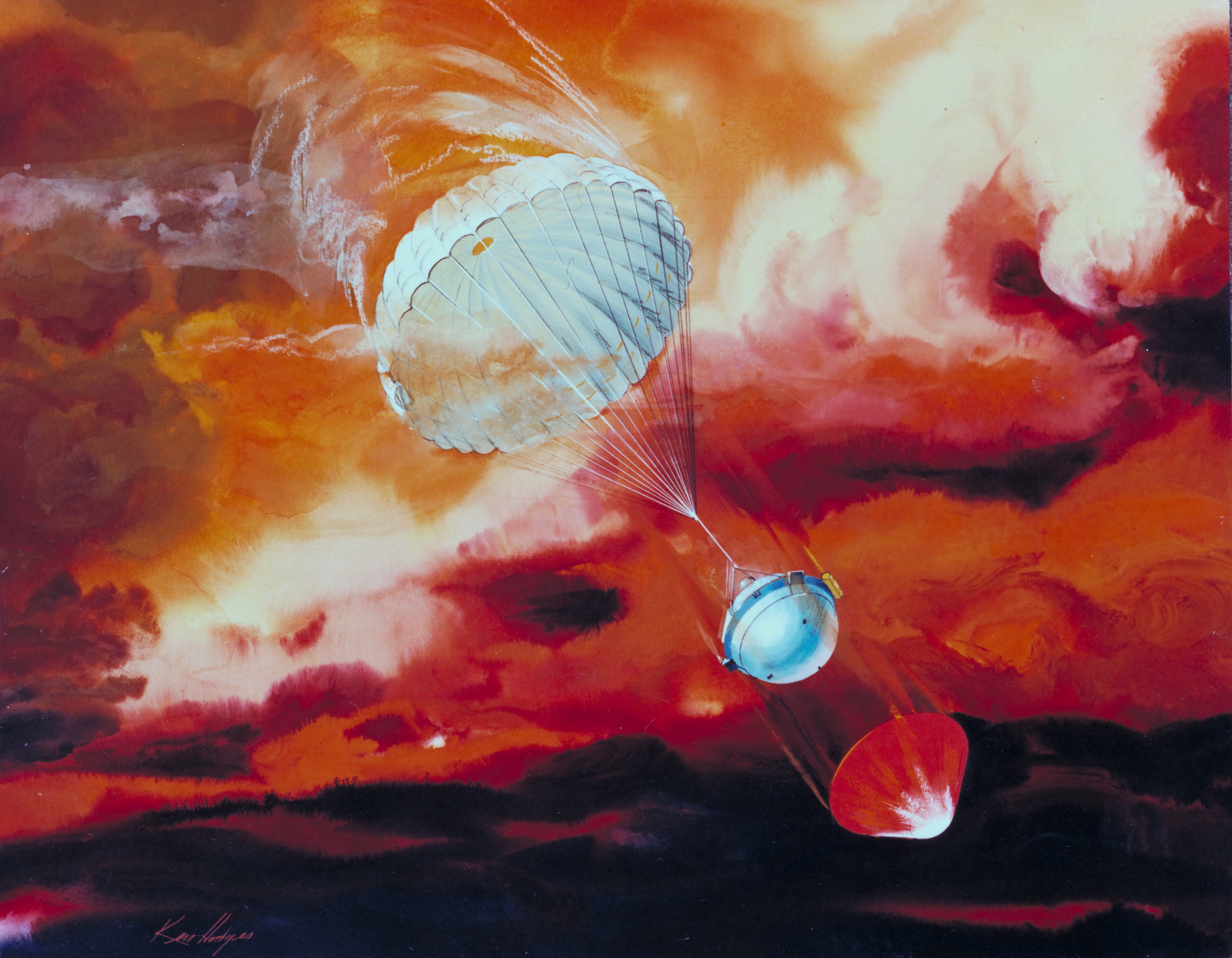
For comparison, artwork for Galileo Probe which penetrated Jupiter's atmosphere in the 1990s

The Saturn Atmospheric Entry Probe is a mission concept study for a robotic spacecraft to deliver a single probe into Saturn to study its atmosphere. The concept study was done to support the NASA 2010 Planetary Science Decadal Survey

Due to the orbits and relative positions of Saturn and Earth, launch was proposed for 30 August 2027 for a 22 June 2034 arrival. The mission was studied for the NASA Planetary Science Decadal Survey as a possible NASA New Frontiers-class mission.

== Overview ==
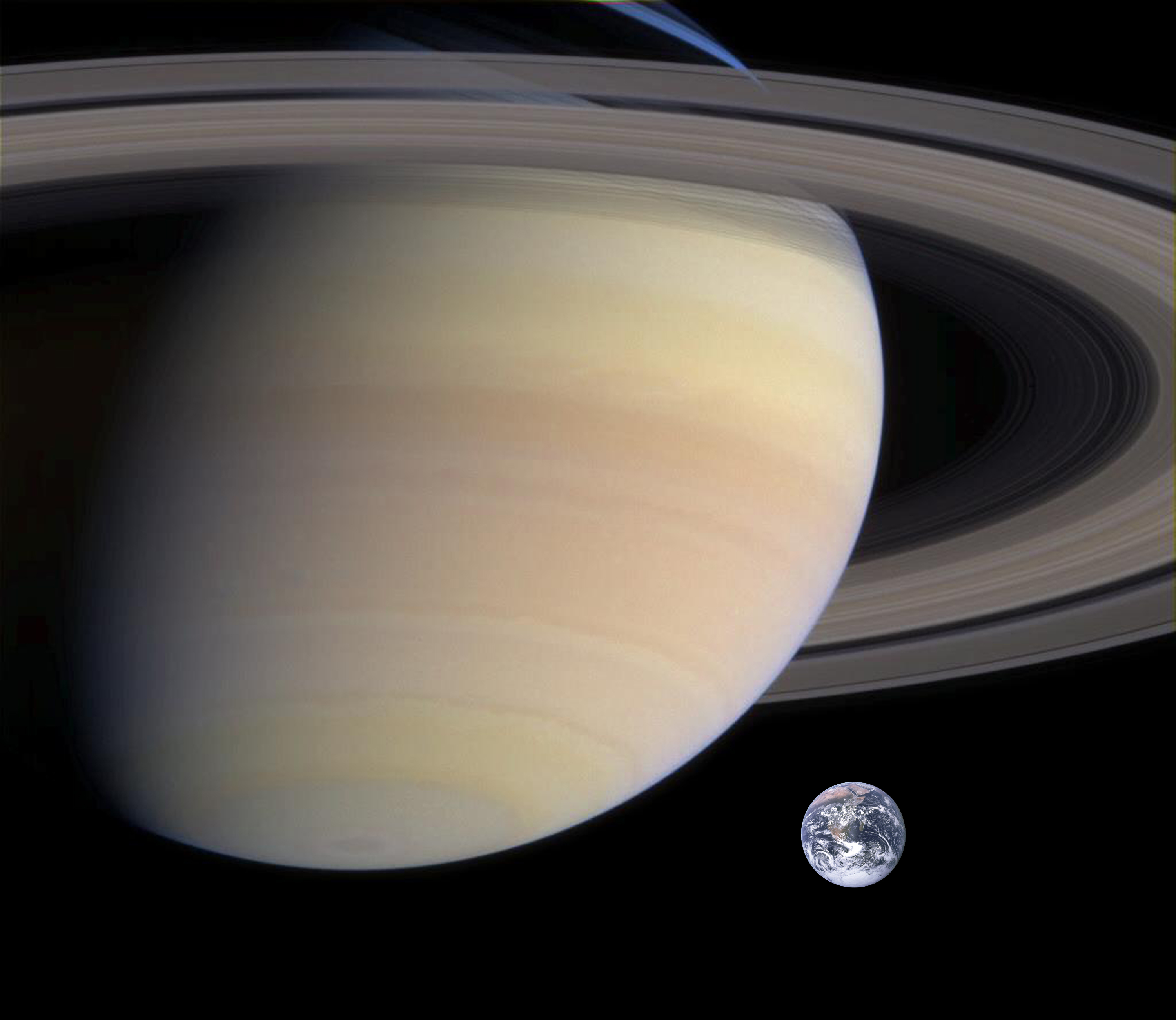
Composite image roughly comparing the sizes of Saturn and Earth

To unveil the processes of outer planet formation and Solar System evolution, detailed studies of the composition, structure, and dynamics of giant planet interiors and atmospheres would be necessary. To constrain the internal structure of gas giants, a combination of both in-situ entry-probe missions and remote-sensing studies of the giant planets would be needed. The Saturn Atmospheric Entry Probe mission would consist of a carrier-relay spacecraft and a probe. The carrier-relay spacecraft would release the probe into Saturn, a gas giant, and provide data relay from the probe to Earth. The probe would determine the structure of the atmosphere as well as noble gas abundances and isotopic ratios of hydrogen, carbon, nitrogen, and oxygen.

=== Objectives ===
- determine the noble gas abundances and isotopic ratios of hydrogen, carbon, nitrogen, oxygen, and argon in Saturn's atmosphere.
- determine the atmospheric structure at the probe descent location.

Tier 2 objectives include:

- determine the vertical profile of zonal winds as a function of depth at the probe entry location;
- determine the location, density, and composition of clouds as a function of depth in the atmosphere;
- determine variability of atmospheric structure and the presence of clouds at the location;
- determine the vertical water abundance profile at the probe descent location;
- make precision isotope measurements for light elements (e.g. S, N, O) in atmospheric constituents.

== Scientific payload ==
In order to complete its objectives, the probe must carry at least these two instruments:

- a mass spectrometer (MS); it would determine the noble gas abundances and isotopic ratios of H, C, N, O, and Ar in Saturn's atmosphere.
- an atmospheric structure instrument (ASI); based on the Galileo probe design, it would consist of three sensors for measuring temperature, pressure, and density.

== Timeline ==
=== Launch and trajectory ===
Launch is proposed for 30 August 2027. After launch, the spacecraft would enter heliocentric orbit and be placed on a trajectory to fly by the Earth, which is proposed to take place on 16 July 2030 at a distance of 300 km. After that, the spacecraft would spend 4 years traveling to Saturn.

=== Approach and targeting phase ===
This phase would begin 8 months before arrival. The probe would separate from carrier–relay spacecraft and free-fall into Saturn's atmosphere.

=== Science phase ===
Hours before the probe's entry, the science phase would begin. An event timer on the probe would initiate activities, while the carrier–relay spacecraft would power up its radio receiver and turn to point its probe-relay antenna to the entry site. The probe would enter Saturn's atmosphere at a velocity of approximately 27 km/s, which is less than the Galileo Probe's velocity of 47.4 km/s. After the entry heating and deceleration phase, the probe would deploy a drogue parachute and then the main parachute when it reached an atmospheric pressure of 0.1 bar. At 1 bar of pressure, the parachute would be released and the descent module would continue free-falling through the atmosphere (possibly with stabilization from another drogue parachute) to the nominal end of mission, 55 minutes after entry and 250 km deep. The probe would be designed to endure at least 10 bars of pressure.

=== Downlink of data, flyby of Saturn and end of mission ===
Shortly after data relay ends, downlink of data would begin. The data set measured by the probe would be about approximately 2 Mb, so 20 minutes would be needed to complete the data downlink. The carrier–relay spacecraft would fly by Saturn at a distance of approximately 100 Mm and it would continue on a solar escape trajectory.

== Mission Proposal ==
Following the concept study done to support the NASA Decadal Survey, the Saturn Atmospheric Entry probe concept was further developed into a mission concept, which was proposed under the name SPRITE ("Saturn PRobe Interior and aTmospheric Explorer") to the NASA New Frontiers program solicitation in 2016.
