= Earth Science Decadal Survey =

Decadal science surveys

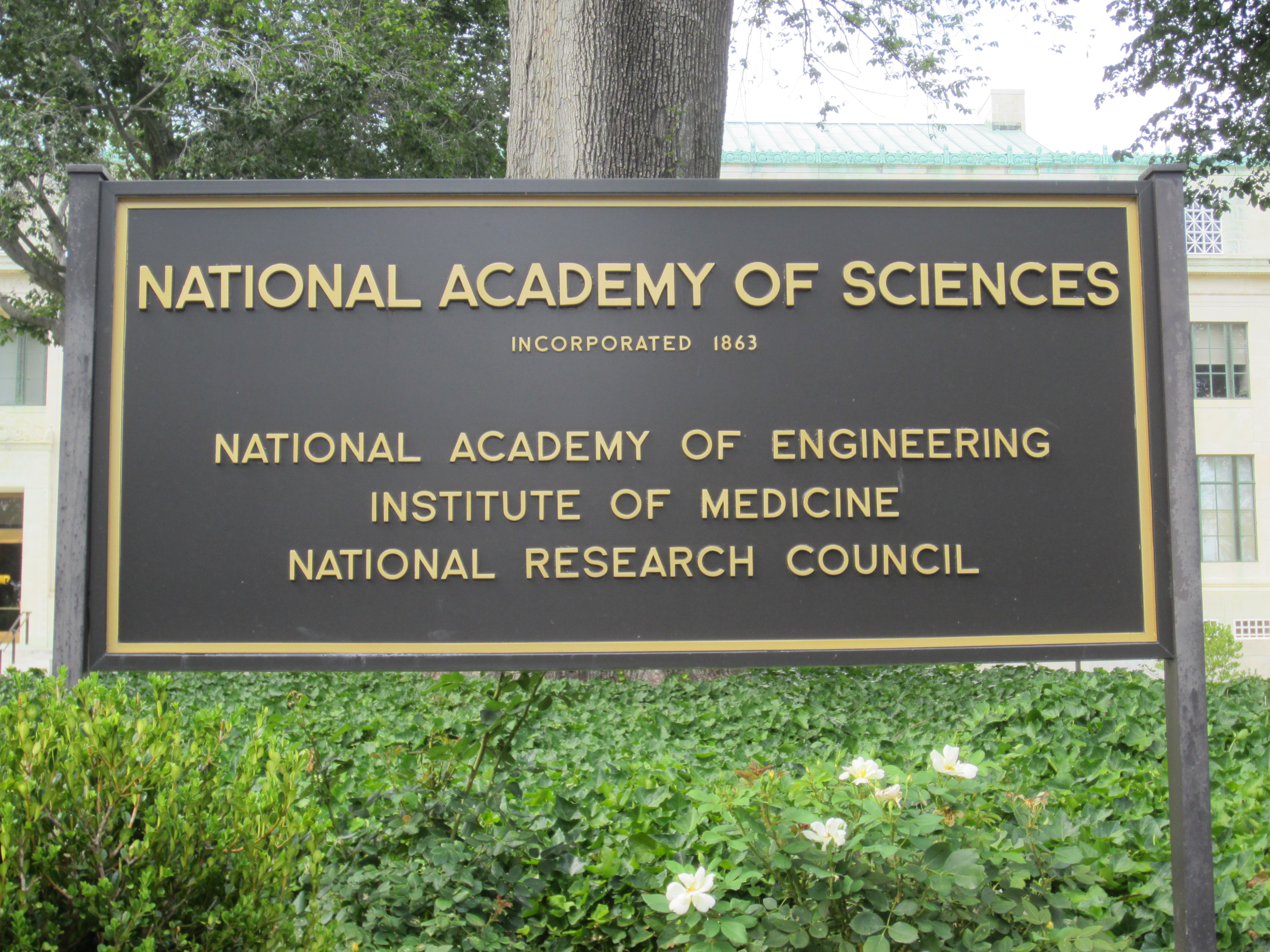
The U.S. National Academy of Sciences recommends Earth observation priorities for NASA, NOAA, and the USGS in its Earth sciences decadal surveys.

The Earth Science Decadal Survey (in full: U.S. National Academy of Sciences Decadal Survey for Earth Science and Applications from Space) is a publication of the United States National Research Council that identifies key research priorities in the field of Earth Sciences with a focus on remote sensing. It is written and released at the request of three United States government agencies: the National Aeronautics and Space Administration (NASA), the National Oceanic and Atmospheric Administration (NOAA) and the U.S. Geological Survey (USGS). The survey is produced by the Committee on the Decadal Survey for Earth Science and Applications from Space (ESAS) of the National Academies of Sciences, Engineering and Medicine (NASEM) Space Studies Board, Division on Engineering and Physical Sciences. Agencies like NASA use the recommendations from the decadal survey to prioritize funding for specific types of scientific research projects.

As of 2021, two decadal surveys have been released. The first, for the decade 2007–2017, "Earth Science and Applications from Space: National Imperatives for the Next Decade and Beyond" was published in 2007. The second, for the decade 2017 to 2027, "Thriving on Our Changing Planet: A Decadal Strategy for Earth Observations from Space" was published in 2018.

== History ==
=== Before the decadal surveys ===
The National Academy of Sciences began creating technical panels and overseeing Earth observation satellites in the late 1950s after the launch of Explorer-I and the Vanguard satellites.

In the intervening years prior to the official decadal surveys, the Space Studies Board of the National Research Council produced many reports outlining Earth observation goals. Examples include: the 1991 "Assessment of Satellite Earth Observation Programs", the 2004 "Utilization of Operational Environmental Satellite Data: Ensuring Readiness for 2010 and Beyond" and the 2005 "Earth Science and Applications from Space: Urgent Needs and Opportunities to Serve the Nation" and "Extending the Effective Lifetimes of Earth Observing Research Missions."

=== 2007-2017, Earth Science and Applications from Space ===
"Earth Science and Applications from Space: National Imperatives for the Next Decade and Beyond" called for Earth observations falling into seven categories: applications and societal benefits, land-use change, weather, climate change, water resources, human health, and solid-Earth hazards. A related NASA planning document was released in 2010 nicknamed the "Climate Initiative" (full name: Responding to the Challenge of Climate and Environmental Change: NASA's Plan for Climate-Centric Architecture for Earth Observations and Applications).

Recommended missions from the 2007 survey included many satellites that became operational in some format. For example, the survey recommended a continuation of NPOESS (dissolved), which is now called JPSS, including instruments like VIIRS on the two satellites Suomi-NPP and NOAA-20 which launched in 2011 and 2017. Soil Moisture Active Passive (SMAP) was launched in 2015. The Ice Cloud and land Elevation Satellite (ICESat-2) was launched in 2018. The Gravity Recovery and Climate Experiment-II, later named Follow-On (GRACE-FO) launched in 2018 to continue the data collection from GRACE-1 and -2.

Other missions recommended by the 2007 survey are still in a planning stage as of 2021. For example, 3D-Winds is planned for 2023 to 2026. Aerosol Cloud Ecosystems (ACE) was the precursor to the Plankton, Aerosol, Cloud and ocean Ecosystems (PACE) mission which is planned to launch in 2023 or 2024. Surface Water and Ocean Topography (SWOT) is planned to launch in 2022.

Other missions from the 2007 list have had other outcomes as of 2021. The Hyperspectral Infrared Imager (HyspIRI) – satellite mission was cancelled as a satellite mission, but has been used as an airborne sensor. The Climate Absolute Radiance and Refractivity Observatory (CLARREO) mission has no set launch date as of 2021. Deformation, Ecosystem Structure, and Dynamics of Ice (DESDynI) had its funding cut in 2011. The GeoCAPE mission, while not implemented, was the precursor for future missions TEMPO, GeoCARB, and GLIMR. The LIDAR Surface Topography (LIST) mission was simulated but never built. The Global Atmospheric Composition Mission (GACM), Precipitation and All-weather Temperature and Humidity (PATH), Snow and Cold Land Processes (SCLP), and Extended Ocean Vector Winds Mission (XOVWM) were not implemented as laid out in the 2007 survey.

=== 2017-2027, Thriving on Our Changing Planet ===
In "Thriving on Our Changing Planet: A Decadal Strategy for Earth Observation from Space," the Earth observation topics that ranked as the most important in the 2017 survey were: aerosol properties, atmospheric winds, greenhouse gases, surface biology and geology, terrestrial ecosystem structure, ocean ecosystem structure, aquatic-coastal biogeochemistry, soil moisture, ocean surface winds and currents, vegetation-snow-surface energy balance, and surface topography and vegetation.

The 2017 survey recommended that United States agencies NASA, NOAA and USGS work on a coordinated approach to earth observations in the next decade.

For aerosol and cloud science, priorities listed include a polarimetric imager for aerosol observations in Earth's atmosphere toward better weather forecasts and concurrent deployment of both a polarimeter and Lidar instrument from an airplane (airborne measurements).

The survey recommended intentional, early development of applications for satellite data to answer societally-relevant research questions before new satellite missions are formalized and well before launch.

The 2017 survey explained that out of the missions laid out in the 2007 survey, some were successfully launched ("implemented"), some were recommended but required further planning ("partially implemented" or a "designated program element"), and some were given an undetermined status (called "incubation," "unallocated," or "recommended as a candidate for Earth System Explorer" missions in the future).

Designated program elements, future missions that were prioritized, include: PACE, Surface Biology and Geology, a successor to GRACE-FO, and a successor to NISAR.

Surface Biology and Geology was one of the designated program elements. The goal is to improve measurements of the characteristics of Earth's surface for natural resources management, food security, and water security, along with many other applications. This mission is still in the early planning stages as of 2021 but will likely have 10s of meters spatial resolution, 16-day revisit time, and a combination of hyperspectral and multispectral coverage.

== See also ==
- Astronomy and Astrophysics Decadal Survey
- Decadal survey
- Earth observation satellite
- Large strategic science missions
- List of Earth observation satellites
- Planetary Science Decadal Survey
- Remote sensing
- Remote sensing (geology)
