= Decadal survey =

10-year US National Academy of Sciences plan

A decadal survey is a 10-year plan outlining scientific missions and goals created by the United States National Academies. It is a summary of input from scientists in the United States and beyond. Examples include:

- Astronomy and Astrophysics Decadal Survey
- Solar and Space Physics Decadal Survey
- Planetary Science Decadal Survey
- Earth Science Decadal Survey

== See also ==
- Snowmass Process, a similar nongovernmental system for particle physics research
