= Geostationary Earth Radiation Budget =

Orbital scientific instrument

The Geostationary Earth Radiation Budget (GERB) is an instrument aboard EUMETSAT's Meteosat Second Generation geostationary satellites designed to make accurate measurements of the Earth radiation budget. It was produced by a European consortium consisting of the United Kingdom, Belgium and Italy. The first, known as GERB 2, was launched on 28 August 2002 on an Ariane 5 rocket. The second, GERB 1, was launched on 21 December 2005, and the third, GERB3, on 5 July 2012. The last GERB 4 device was launched 14 July 2015. The first launched GERB 2 on MSG 1 is currently situated over the Indian Ocean at 41.5°E, while GERBs 1 and 3 on MSG 2 and 3 are still located over the standard Africa EUMETSAT position. GERB 4 on MSG is yet to become operational.

== Scientific motivations and objectives ==
The unprecedented rate of atmospheric CO_{2} increase occurring since the Industrial Revolution due to human activity is of much concern to scientists as it has occurred an order of magnitude faster than planet Earth has ever experienced. Climate models described as Global Circulation Models (GCMs) are currently avenue to investigate and try and predict how Earth climate will change in response such an un-precedented rate of change. Such computer models largely agree on many predictions of how climate will be 'forced' to a different state by such changes but there is still much disagreement, more specifically how such forcing will also results in 'feedbacks' to the system. For example, increased CO_{2} will increase the greenhouse effect resulting in warmer atmosphere and more melting of Arctic ice. However it is known that a warmer atmosphere can for example contain a higher quantity of water vapor at the same relative humidity, and the melting of highly reflective white Arctic ice will expose open ocean to sunlight. Since water vapor is itself a very strong greenhouse gas and dark Arctic Ocean will absorb more sunlight than highly reflected floating ice, these are both reasonably well understood to be positive feedbacks that will act to accelerate the rate of global warming. Perhaps the least understood aspect of climate change involves clouds, and how they might change in-response to straight atmospheric warming from increased CO_{2}. These effects collectively referred to as cloud forcing or Cloud Radiative Forcing (CRF) and Feedback are not yet understood to the level where it can be predicted with certainty whether their possible feedbacks will in total be positive and accelerate, or negative and slow down global warming. The actions of the Earth weather/climate system are essentially the work done from a global scale heat engine, the heat into which comes from all the absorbed solar energy while the heat out is from thermal infra-red emissions back to space. These two radiative fluxes are referred to as Short-Wave (SW for solar) and Long-Wave (LW for IR) components in what is known as the Earth Radiation Budget (ERB, naturally the heat in requires the reflected SW to be measured and subtracted from the also needed in incoming solar flux). Clouds hence naturally have a huge effect on the ERB due to their high solar SW reflectivity and their strong absorption of outgoing thermal LW. Globally ERB fluxes can only be measured from orbit and have been collected since the 1970s by missions from the US and Europe, most extensively since 1998 by the NASA Clouds and the Earth's Radiant Energy System (CERES) instruments in low Earth orbit. Such orbital platforms however at most see each point of Earth only twice per day, while cloud formation and modulation of the ERB occurs on the time scale of minutes (see Fig.1). Hence although vital for tracking global changes in the ERB such low orbital measurements cannot be directly used to validate computer simulations of changes to convective cloud formation and dissipation in direct response to the inevitable surface warming due to CO_{2} increases etc. To address this deficiency in the Earth observing system the European consortium between the UK, Belgium and Italy embarked on the Geo-stationary Earth Radiation Budget (GERB) project, with the intention of placing a highly accurate ERB radiometer on board the Meteosat Second Generation (MSG) spin stabilized platforms.

== GERB device and calibration ==
The GERB project is led by the Space and Atmospheric Group (SPAT) based at Imperial College UK, with Professor John. E. Harries the original Principal Investigator and now succeeded by Dr Helen Brindley. The devices themselves were constructed by Rutherford Appleton Laboratory using an Italian 3 mirror silver telescope and electronics designed by the Space Science center at the University of Leicester UK. Each of the four completed GERB devices underwent extensive ground radiometric calibration in a Vacuum Calibration Chamber (VCC) at the Earth Observation and Characterization Facility (EOCF) also the Imperial College and designed by Ray Wrigley. Such tests included confirmation of linearity, LW radiometric gain determination using Warm and Cold BlackBodies (WBB & CBB), SW gain determination using Visible Calibration Source (VISCS) lamp and spot checks on the system level spectral response.

Each GERB device makes use of a linear array of blackened thermopile detectors manufactured by Honeywell, which stare at the Earth on each 100rpm rotation of the MSG platform by making use of a De-Scan Mirror (DSM). Hence a column of the Earth disk is taken on each revolution allowing 250x256 Total channel samples followed by 250x256 SW samples with the quartz filter in place every 5 minutes (i.e. the relative phase of the DSM to MSG rotation is shifted slightly each rotation, see Fig.4 bottom right). On each rotation the detectors hence also see the Internal Blackbody (IBB) and Calibration Monitor (CalMon) to allow continuous upgrading of LW & SW gain changes. Its placement toward the outskirts of the 3 meter wide MSG spinning platform demanded rigorous design of the GERB device to withstand the 16g constant centrifugal force to which it is exposed as the DSM rotates.

Every 15mins after 3 complete Total and SW 250x256 arrays of the Earth disk are taken a synthetic LW result is obtained from the mean difference between the two. Such ERB results are then combined with a resolution enhancement and cloud retrievals using the Spinning Enhanced Visible and Infrared Imager (SEVIRI) also on the MSG platform. The combination of GERB and SEVIRI through data synergy also required detailed mapping of each of the 256 GERB detector/telescope Field of View response or Point Spread Function (PSF, see Matthews (2004) ). This was done using a He-Ne laser computer controlled to map each of the 256 thermopiles responses after being covered with gold blacking. Full details of the GERB ground calibration can be obtained at Matthews (2003). The spectral response or measure of the relative absorption at different wavelength of light for each GERB detector is required for the process of un-filtering each thermopile's raw signal. This uses radiative transfer models to estimate the spectral shape of a particular scene radiance to estimate an un-filtering ratio, or the factor needed to account for non-uniform spectral response. For each GERB device this relies on the multiplication of unit level laboratory measurements of detector, telescope, DSM and quartz filter spectral throughput/absorption. The accuracy of GERB SW results is directly dependent on the quality of such measurements as the SW gain is determined using the VISCS lamp, whose spectrum is significantly shifted to longer wavelengths compared to that of the Sun. Such GERB accuracy is currently estimated to be around the 2% level by ref. Such un-filtering is performed by the Royal Meteorological Institute Belgium (RMIB), along with the synergy with SEVIRI data and conversion from radiance to irradiance using Angular Dependency Models (ADMs).

=== GERB in-flight calibration ===
For each of the 100 rotations per minute every GERB detector obtains a scan of both the Internal Blackbody (IBB) and CalMon solar diffuser. The gain in Counts per Wm^{−2}Sr^{−1} and offsets of each thermopile pixel are regularly updated based on the known temperature of the IBB and its signal's difference from that of the Earthview. The original intention was to use the aluminium solar diffuser CalMon views to track changes in the GERB device throughput of solar photons (see Equations developed by J. Mueller). However, in-flight solar diffusers and their sunlight transmission changes drastically on orbit such that the diffusers on CERES were deemed un-usable by NASA. Also the integrating sphere nature of the CalMon means that solar photons will likely have undergone many reflections off aluminium on the way to the GERB telescope, likely significantly reducing energy at the 830 nm dip in aluminium reflectivity by an unknown amount. Possible alternatives to track changes to GERB device solar response include comparison to other ERB devices such as the proposed NASA CLARREO instrument, or perhaps other broadband devices assuming their calibration is later validated. Another possibility is the use of Moon views as used by the SeaWIFS project to ensure stability of Earth results (see Fig.5).

== GERB data ==
GERB data is available from the Rutherford Appleton Laboratory GGSPS download site below as shown in the animation of Fig.6 which displayed full Earth Disk reflected SW (left) and outgoing LW (right). This animation shows 24hrs worth of GERB SW and LW fluxes which will enable climate scientists to validate how GCMs simulate cloud formation and dissipation and the effects on the ERB.

=== GERB-SEVIRI synergy ===
As ERB fluxes from the CERES instruments are paired with MODIS imager cloud retrievals, it was always the intention to tie GERB SW and LW measurements with results from the Spinning Enhanced Visible and Infra-Red Imager (SEVIRI) primary device on the MSG platforms. In addition to the cloud/aerosol retrievals from the narrow-band SEVIRI instrument, the high spatial resolution imager data is combined with the accuracy of GERB to perform resolution enhancement of climate driving fluxes to better evaluate climate model simulations of cloud formation/dissipation and know how they may speed up or slow down climate change. SEVIRI radiances are also used in the GERB un-filtering process to help estimate the spectral shape of the scene being viewed.

=== Data access ===
In addition to the Rutherford GGSPS download site, a new access hub is being set up at the Centre for Environmental Data Analysis (CEDA), which is also listed in the URLs below that will allow access to GERB files.
