= Solar and Space Physics Decadal Survey =

Decadal survey in the scientific field of heliophysics

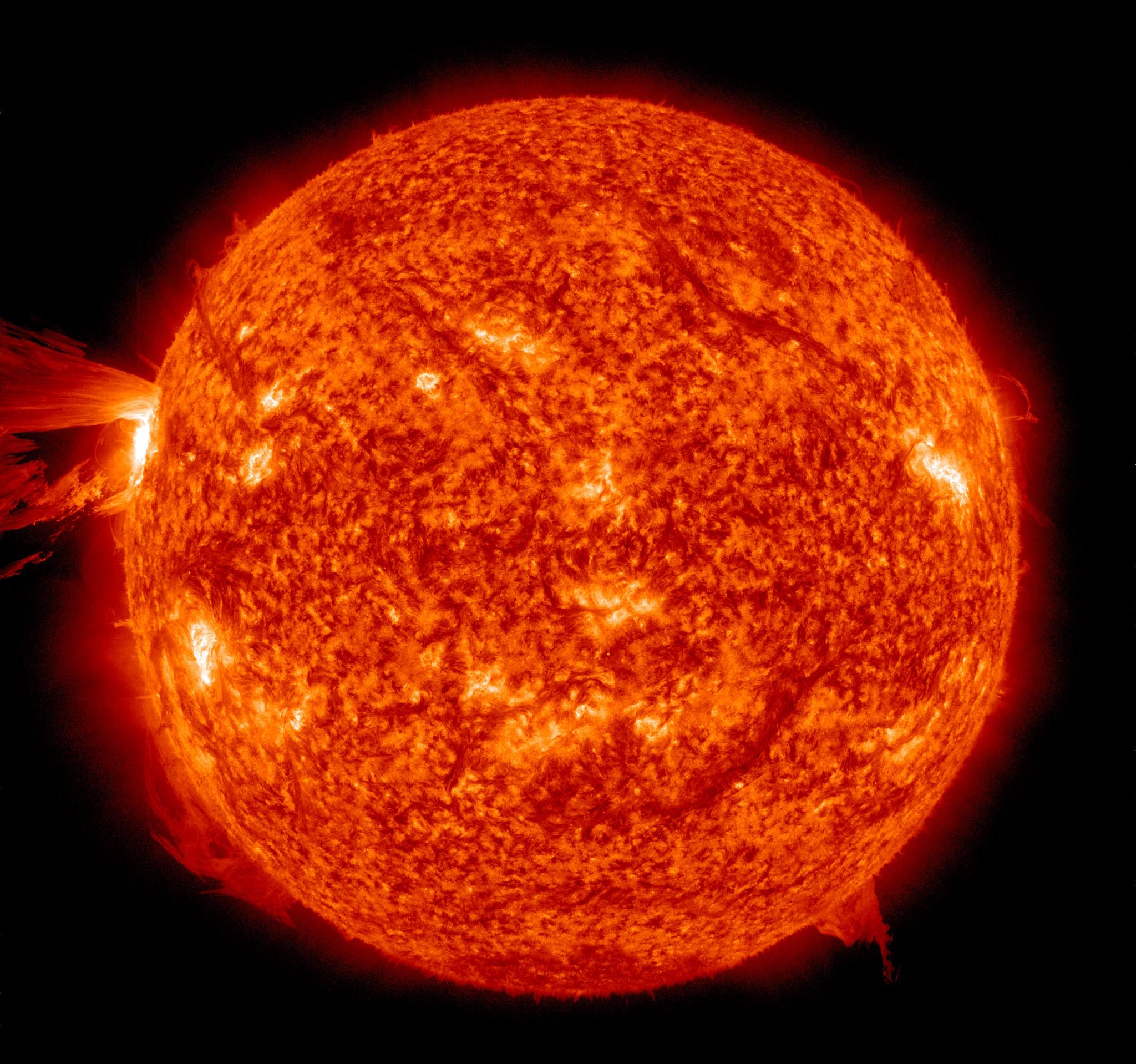
A coronal mass ejection as imaged by the Solar Dynamics Observatory

The Solar and Space Physics Decadal Survey is a publication of the National Research Council produced for NASA, as well as other US government agencies such as NOAA and the National Science Foundation. It is produced with the purpose of identifying a recommended scientific strategy in the field of heliophysics for the following decade. Agencies such as NASA utilize the decadal survey in order to prioritize funding for specific missions or scientific research projects.

As of 2024, two decadal surveys have been published. The first, "The Sun to the Earth — and Beyond: A Decadal Research Strategy in Solar and Space Physics" was published in 2003 for the period 2003-2012. The second, "Solar and Space Physics: A Science for a Technological Society" was released in 2013 for the period 2013-2022. A third decadal survey, "The Next Decade of Discovery in Solar and Space Physics", covering the period 2024-2033, is nearing the end of production and is planned to be released in early winter 2024.

== 2003-2012, The Sun to the Earth — and Beyond ==
"The Sun to the Earth — and Beyond: A Decadal Research Strategy in Solar and Space Physics" was released in 2003. The committee was chaired by Louis J. Lanzerotti of Lucent Technologies. The highest priority recommendation named in the report was the Solar Probe mission, intended to explore the explore the inner regions around the Sun. It also recommended the development of the Magnetospheric Multiscale Mission and of a Jupiter Polar Orbiter.

== 2013-2022, A Science for a Technological Society ==
"Solar and Space Physics: A Science for a Technological Society" was released in August 2012. The committee was chaired by Daniel N. Baker of the University of Colorado. It laid out four key science goals: establishing the origins of solar activity, gaining a deeper understanding of Earth's magnetic field, exploring the Sun's interactions with the Solar System and interstellar medium, and characterizing the fundamental processes of the heliosphere. The top priorities recommended to NASA were the restoration of the Medium-Class Explorers program, continuation of the Living With a Star and Solar Terrestrial Probes programs, and continued development of the Solar Probe Plus mission and the Geospace Dynamics Constellation as part of LWaS.

== 2024-2033, The Next Decade of Discovery in Solar and Space Physics ==
A pre-publication copy of The Next Decade of Discovery in Solar and Space Physics was released in December 2024. The committee was chaired by Stephen A. Fuselier of the Southwest Research Institute and Robyn Millan of Dartmouth College. Rather than articulate specific goals, the document was intended to cover a wider, more diverse array of science and space weather research based around six interconnected themes similar to the previous Decadal Survey. The new Survey recommended that NOAA establish a new ground-based space weather research office, that the NSF increase workforce support initiatives and investment in research infrastructure including CubeSats, and that NASA fund two new flagship missions, the Links constellation to study Earth's magnetosphere from more than two dozen positions, and the Solar Polar Orbiter mission to fully succeed Ulysses and the Parker Solar Probe, in addition to continuing the Geospace Dynamics Constellation's development.

== See also ==
- Astronomy and Astrophysics Decadal Survey
- Planetary Science Decadal Survey
- Earth Science Decadal Survey
- Snowmass Process
