= Planetary Science Decadal Survey =

Publication of the United States National Research Council

Origins, Worlds, and Life: A Decadal Strategy for Planetary Science and Astrobiology 2023 - 2032
- Author: National Academy Space Studies Board
- Country: United States
- Language: English
- Genre: Astronomy
- Publisher: United States National Research Council
- Published: April 19, 2022
- Media type: Paperback, PDF

The Planetary Science Decadal Survey is a serial publication of the United States National Research Council produced for NASA and other United States Government Agencies such as the National Science Foundation. The documents identify key questions facing planetary science and outlines recommendations for space and ground-based exploration ten years into the future. Missions to gather data to answer these big questions are described and prioritized, where appropriate. Similar decadal surveys cover astronomy and astrophysics, earth science, and heliophysics.

As of 2022 there have been three "Decadals", one published in April 2002 for the decade from 2003 to 2013, one published on March 7, 2011 for the decade from 2013 to 2022, and one published on April 19, 2022 for the decade from 2023 to 2032.

== Before the decadal surveys ==
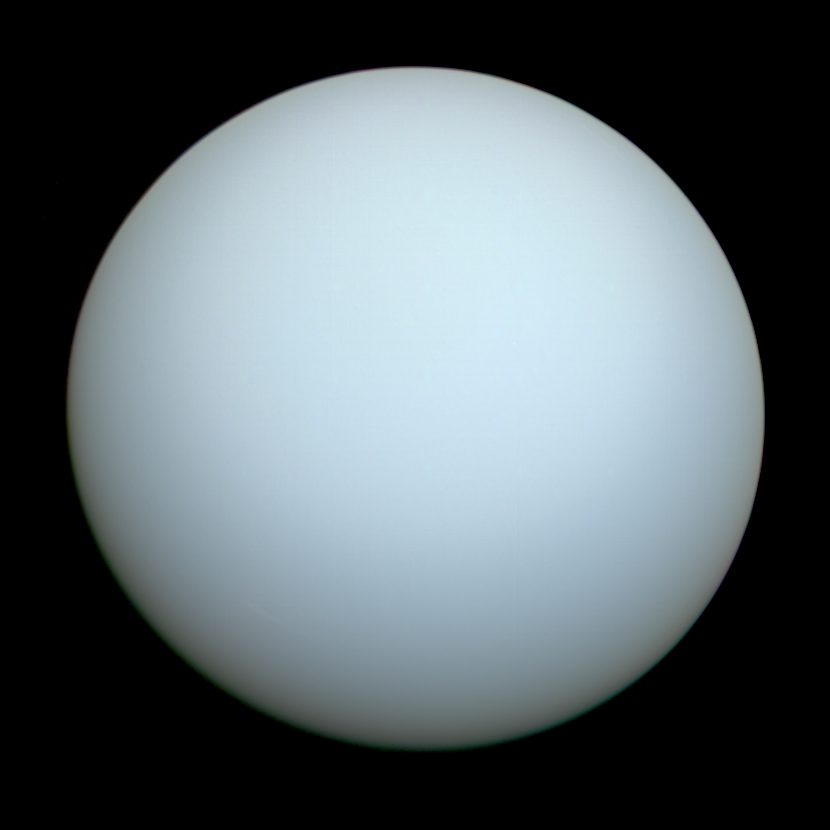
Uranus photographed by Voyager 2 in 1986

- Planetary Exploration, 1968-1975, published in 1968, recommended missions to Jupiter, Mars, Venus, and Mercury in that order of priority.
- Report of Space Science, 1975 recommended exploration of the outer planets.
- Strategy for Exploration of the Inner Planets, 1977–1987 was published in 1977.
- Strategy for the Exploration of Primitive Solar-System Bodies--Asteroids, Comets, and Meteoroids, 1980–1990 was published in 1980.
- A Strategy for Exploration of the Outer Planets, 1986-1996 was published in 1986.
- Space Science in the Twenty-First Century – Imperatives for the Decades 1995 to 2015, published in 1988, recommended a focus on "Galileo-like missions to study Saturn, Uranus and Neptune" including a mission to rendezvous with Saturn's rings and study Titan. It also recommended study of the moon with a "Lunar Geoscience Orbiter", a network of lunar rovers and sample return from the lunar surface. The report recommended a Mercury Orbiter to study not only that planet but provide some solar study as well. A "Program of Extensive Study of Mars" beginning with the Mars Pathfinder mission was planned for 1995 to be followed up by one in 1998 to return samples to Earth for study. Study of primitive bodies such as a comet or asteroid was recommended as a flyby mission of the Apollo and Amor asteroids.

== 2003–2013, New Frontiers in the Solar System ==
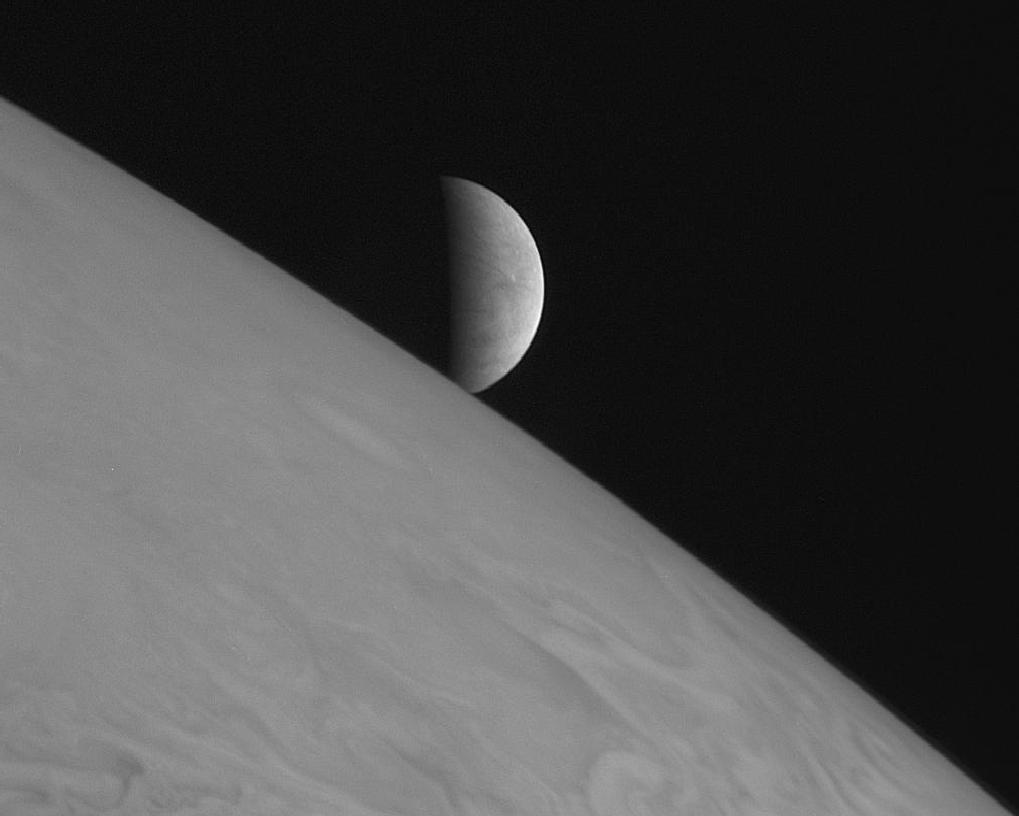
Jupiter and Europa as viewed by New Horizons in 2007

New Frontiers in the Solar System: An Integrated Exploration Strategy, published in 2003, mapped out a plan for the decade from 2003 to 2013. The committee producing the survey was led by Michael J. Belton. Five panels focused on the inner planets, Mars, the giant planets, large satellites and astrobiology. The survey placed heavy emphasis on Mars exploration including the Mars Exploration Rovers, established the New Frontiers program including New Horizons mission to study Pluto and established programs in power and propulsion to lay a technological basis for programs in later decades including crewed missions beyond Earth orbit.

The paper suggested that NASA should prioritize the following missions:

=== Medium-class missions ===
Primitive bodies:

- Kuiper Belt-Pluto Explorer
- Comet Surface Sample Return
- Trojan Asteroid/Centaur Reconnaissance
- Asteroid Lander/Rover/Sample Return
- Triton/Neptune Flyby

Inner planets:

- Venus In-Situ Explorer (VISE)
- South Pole-Aitken Basin Sample Return

Mars:

- Mars Long-Lived Lander Network
- Mars Upper Atmosphere Orbiter
- Mars Science Laboratory

Giant planets:

- Jupiter Polar Orbiter with Probes (JPOP)

Large satellites:

- Io Observer
- Ganymede Orbiter
- Neptune flyby

=== Large-class missions ===
Primitive bodies:

- Comet Cryogenic Sample Return

Mars:

- Mars Sample Return

Outer planets:

- Neptune Orbiter with Probes

Large satellites:

- Europa Geophysical Explorer
- Europa Pathfinder Lander
- Europa Astrobiological Lander
- Titan Explorer
- Uranus Orbiter
- Neptune Orbiter

== 2013–2022, Visions and Voyages for Planetary Science ==
Visions and Voyages for Planetary Science in the Decade 2013 – 2022 (2011) was published in prepublication form on March 7, 2011, and in final form later that year. Draft versions of the document were presented at town hall meetings around the country, at lunar and planetary conferences, and made available publicly on the NASA website and via the National Academies Press. The report differed from previous reports in that it included a "brutally honest" budgetary review from a 3rd party contractor.

=== Flagship missions ===
The report highlighted a new Mars rover, a mission to Jupiter's moon Europa, and a mission to Uranus and its moons as proposed Flagship Missions. The Mars mission was given highest priority, followed by the Europa mission.

The Mars rover proposal was called MAX-C and it would store samples for eventual return to Earth, but the method of return was left open. It only recommended the rover mission if it could be done cheaply enough (US$2.5 billion).

=== Studies ===
The committee producing the survey was led by Steve Squyres of Cornell University and included 5 panels focusing on the inner planets (Mercury, Venus, and the Moon), Mars (not including Phobos and Deimos), the gas giant planets, satellites (Galilean satellites, Titan, and other satellites of the giant planets) and primitive bodies (asteroids, comets, Phobos, Deimos, Pluto/Charon and other Kuiper belt objects, meteorites, and interplanetary dust).

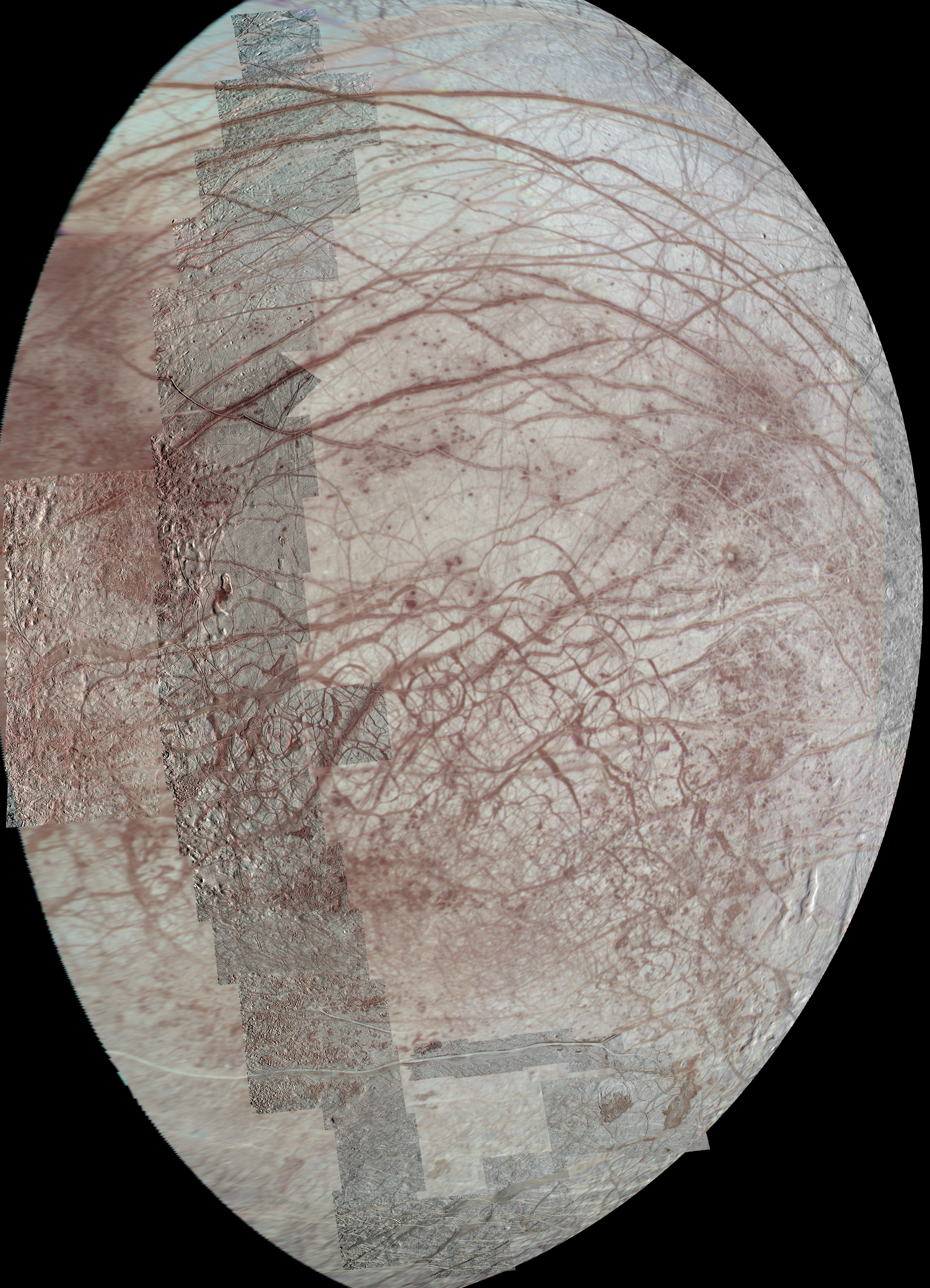
A previous mission collected the data for this mosaic of Europa, a Jovian moon

Mission & Technology Studies:

- Mercury Lander Mission Concept Study
- Venus Mobile Explorer Mission Concept Study
- Venus Intrepid Tessera Lander Concept Study
- Venus Climate Mission Concept Study
- Lunar Geophysical Network Concept Study
- Lunar Polar Volatiles Explorer Mission Concept Study
- Near Earth Asteroid Trajectory Opportunities in 2020–2024
- Mars 2018 MAX-C Caching Rover Concept Study
- Mars Sample Return Orbiter Mission Concept Study
- Mars Sample Return Lander Mission Concept Study
- Mars 2018 Sky Crane Capability Study
- Mars Geophysical Network Options
- Mars Geophysical Network Concept Study
- Mars Polar Climate Concepts
- Jupiter Europa Orbiter (component of EJSM) Concept Study
- Io Observer Concept Study
- Ganymede Orbiter Concept Study
- Trojan Tour Concept Study
- Titan Saturn System Mission
- Saturn Atmospheric Entry Probe Trade Study
- Saturn Atmospheric Entry Probe Mission Concept Study
- Saturn Ring Observer Concept Study
- Enceladus Flyby & Sample Return Concept Studies
- Enceladus Orbiter Concept Study
- Titan Lake Probe Concept Study
- Chiron Orbiter Mission Concept Study
- Uranus and Neptune Orbiter and Probe Concept Studies
- Neptune-Triton-Kuiper Belt Objects Mission Concept Study
- Comet Surface Sample Return Mission Concept Study
- Cryogenic Comet Nucleus Sample Return Mission Technology Study
- Small Fission Power System Feasibility Study

The recommendation for the New Frontiers program was a selection from one of Comet Surface Sample Return, Lunar South Pole-Aitken Basin Sample Return, Saturn Probe, Trojan Tour and Rendezvous, and Venus In Situ Explorer. Then another selection adding Io Observer, Lunar Geophysical Network (for NF 4 and 5). In the 2011 response from NASA to the review, NASA supported the New Frontiers recommendations. The first three New Frontiers missions include New Horizons to Pluto flyby, the Juno Jupiter orbiter, and the OSIRIS-REx near-Earth orbit sample return mission.

== 2023–2032, Origins, Worlds, and Life ==
Origins, Worlds, and Life: A Decadal Strategy for Planetary Science and Astrobiology 2023-2032 (2022) was published on April 19, 2022.

=== Flagship Missions ===
The report recommended the Uranus Orbiter and Probe as the highest priority new Flagship Mission, and the Enceladus Orbilander as the second-highest. It recommended continuing the ongoing Mars Sample Return program as the highest priority overall, subject to cost restraints.

=== New Frontiers Program ===
The report recommended several different possible mission concepts for the sixth New Frontiers mission:

- Centaur orbiter and lander
- Ceres sample return
- Comet surface sample return
- Enceladus multiple flyby
- Lunar Geophysical Network
- Saturn probe
- Titan orbiter
- Venus In Situ Explorer

== See also ==
- Astronomy and Astrophysics Decadal Survey
- Earth Science Decadal Survey
- Solar and Space Physics Decadal Survey
