= CLARREO =

NASA decadal survey mission

CLARREO (Climate Absolute Radiance and Refractivity Observatory, administratively renamed to Calibration Absolute Radiance and Refractivity Observatory in early 2026) is a high-priority NASA decadal survey mission, originally selected as such by the National Research Council in 2007. The CLARREO mission is intended to provide a metrology laboratory in orbit to accurately quantify and attribute Earth's climate change (see List of climate research satellites). The mission is also designed to transfer its high accuracy to other spaceborne sensors. It would serve as a reference calibration standard in orbit, making climate trends apparent in their data sets by 2055, within a 30-year time frame after its planned launch in the 2020s. These measurements may go on to enable testing, validation, and improvement of climate model prediction.

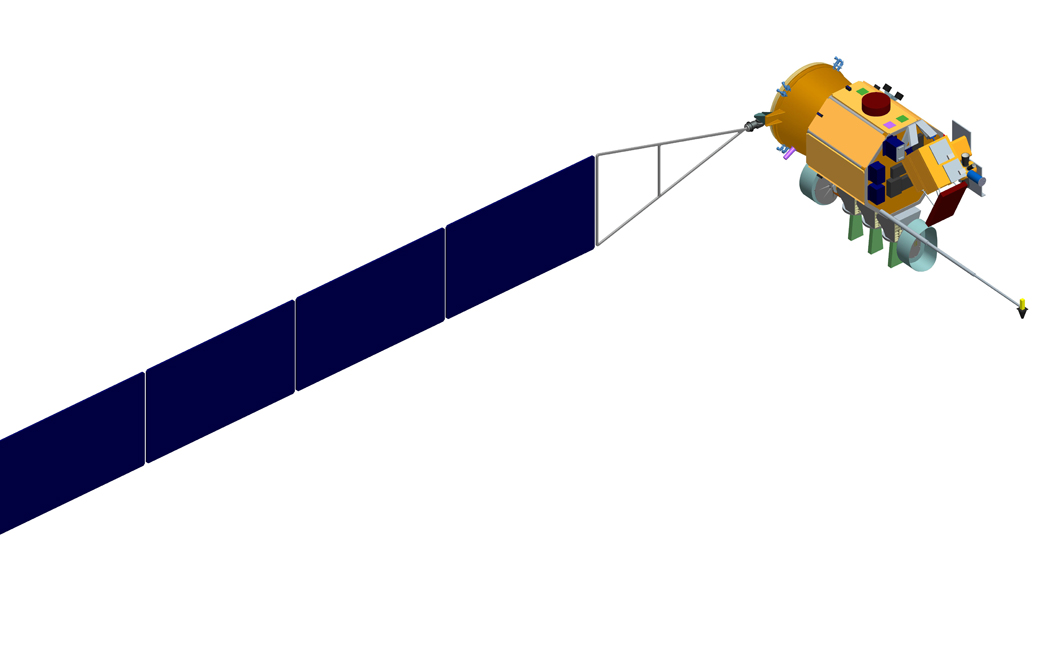

Due to funding cuts in announced for the 2012 budget, the CLARREO mission was significantly scaled back, while remaining spaceborne projects were eyed to fill the gap. In the President's financial year 2016 budget request, a smaller CLARREO Pathfinder (CPF) mission was provided $76.9M to demonstrate essential measurement technologies of the CLARREO Tier 1 Decadal Survey mission. That funding will potentially support the flight of the Reflected Solar (RS) spectrometer, which is one piece of the full Decadal Survey-recommended mission, hosted on the International Space Station (ISS) from December 2023. The first Trump administration unsuccessfully tried several times to defund the mission.

== Mission concept ==
Below is the mission concept presented at the Mission Concept Review in November 2010. CLARREO was then envisioned to consist of four observatories on two dual-manifested launches on Minotaur IV+ vehicles.

- Three Instruments (two of each)
  - Infrared (IR) Spectrometer
  - Reflected Solar (RS) Spectrometer
  - Global Navigation Satellite System-Radio Occultation (GNSS-RO)
- Four Observatories, two dual-manifested launches on Minotaur IV+ vehicles
  - July 2018: Two infrared observatories, each with GNSS-RO
  - May 2020: Two reflected solar observatories
- 609 km polar orbits (90 degree inclination)

Alternative mission concepts were developed to accommodate reduced available funding. A CLARREO mission on the International Space Station, to include one each of the RS and IR spectrometers, was found to provide the best science value for the lowest feasible cost. Due to the ISS orbital inclination of 51.65 degrees, CLARREO on ISS measurements would not include the polar regions, resulting in the mission being unable to track global spectral benchmarks compared to the version of the mission presented at the Mission Concept Review.

=== Pathfinder mission concept ===
In 2016, a Pathfinder mission to the full CLARREO mission received funding. "The allocated funds support the flight of a Reflected Solar (RS) spectrometer, hosted on the International Space Station (ISS) in the 2020 time frame. ... The CPF is a Class D mission with 1 year of operations on orbit and 1 year for analysis of acquired data." The mission is designed to demonstrate essential measurement technologies in orbit that can be used to reduce the risk of a full CLARREO mission. CLARREO Pathfinder has two primary objectives: to demonstrate high accuracy on orbit traceable to International Systems of Units (SI) and to transfer that accuracy to other spaceborne sensors. Pathfinders threshold objective compared to the full baseline CLARREO mission is relaxed by a factor of two from 0.15% to 0.3% (k=1).

== Reference intercalibration ==
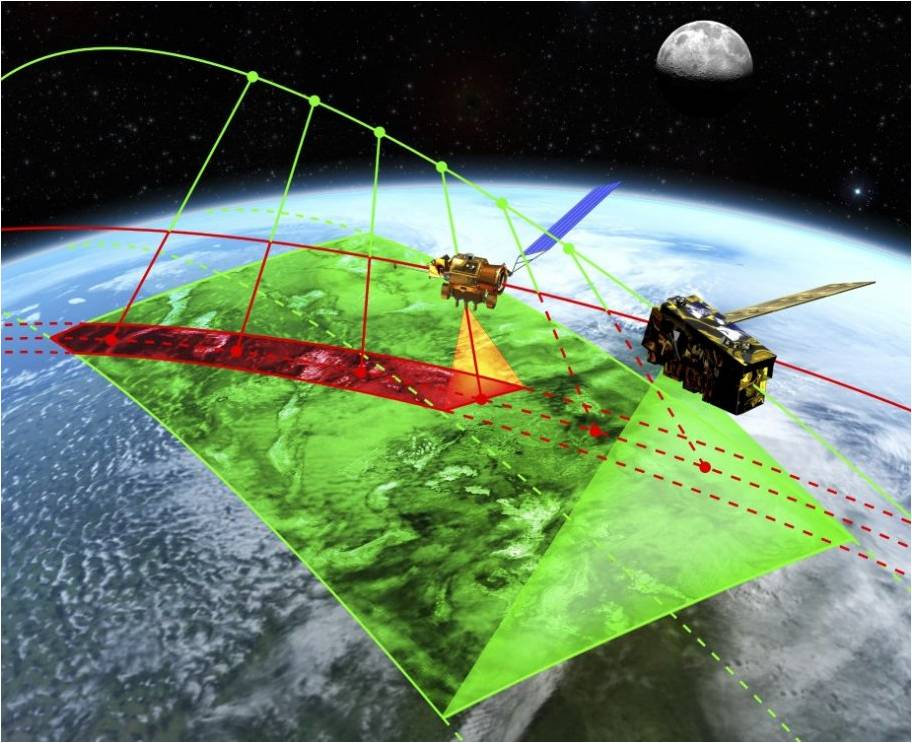
Fig. 1. The CLARREO RS spectrometer has the capability to match measurements from other spaceborne sensors spatially, temporally, spectrally, and angularly. This approximate on-orbit data matching is enabled by CLARREO's ability to point its RS instrument in two dimensions.

Current satellite-based sensors are not designed to meet the accuracy requirements needed for climate change detection. Many sensors used for climate measurements were designed to meet operational weather needs and are not optimized for climate sampling. These sensors, along with older instruments designed for climate, lack the on-board ability to test for systematic errors on orbit. The CLARREO mission will meet these goals through careful consideration of the instrument design, calibration traceability at all stages of development and operation, with spectral, spatial and temporal sampling focused specifically on the creation of climate records. Then after development of new cross-calibration methodologies far more accurate than those achieved today, CLARREO may serve as an in-orbit standard to provide reference intercalibration for missions like the broadband Clouds and the Earth's Radiant Energy System (CERES), operational sounders including the Cross-track Infrared Sounder (CrIS) and Infrared Atmospheric Sounding Interferometer (IASI), and imagers such as the Visible Infrared Imaging Radiometer Suite (VIIRS) and Advanced Very-High-Resolution Radiometer (AVHRR).

== Mission selection ==
The 2007 National Research Council (NRC) Decadal Survey report, "Earth Science and Applications from Space: National Imperatives for the Next Decade and Beyond," provides the basis for the future direction of NASA's space-based Earth observation system. Missions were ranked according to scientific merit, contributions to long-term observational records, societal benefits, affordability, and technological readiness. The four missions recommended for earliest implementation by NASA were classified as “Tier 1” missions and included CLARREO. The NRC Decadal Survey concluded that the single most critical issue for current climate change observations was their lack of accuracy and low confidence in observing the small climate change signals over decade time scales. CLARREO observations of climate change on decadal scales address this issue by achieving the required levels of accuracy and traceability to SI standards for a set of observations sensitive to a wide range of key climate change observations.

Decadal Survey recommendations represent the community's input on the future direction of space-based Earth science; therefore, NASA will continue to engage the scientific community to refine mission requirements during the planning for CLARREO.

== Science applications ==
CLARREO could make highly accurate decadal change observations that are traceable to International Systems of Units (SI) standards. For example, at solar wavelengths this is intended to be confirmed after launch using comparison of actual data to theoretical simulations of lunar/solar radiance generated within a high-fidelity sensor model, although it is unclear how such a non-experimental approach will ensure SI traceability. The Earth observations then made by CLARREO have sensitivity to the most critical but least understood climate radiative forcings, responses, and feedbacks, such as:

- Infrared spectra to infer temperature and water vapor feedbacks, cloud feedbacks, and decadal change of temperature profiles, water vapor profiles, clouds, and greenhouse gas radiative effects
- GNSS-RO to infer decadal change of temperature profiles
- Solar reflected spectra to infer cloud feedbacks, snow/ice albedo feedbacks, and decadal change of clouds, radiative fluxes, aerosols, snow cover, sea ice, and land use

== Societal benefits ==
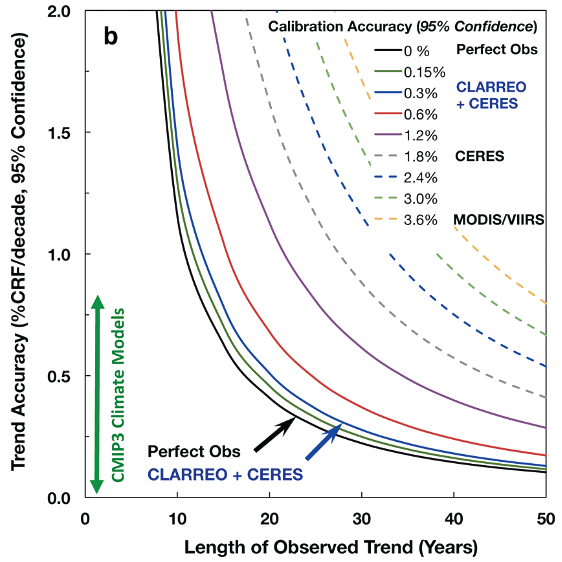
Fig. 3. Reproduced estimates of time needed after climate mission launch to detect predicted CRF climate trends with 95% confidence, at different calibration accuracies.

After inter-calibrating with CLARREO ISS/Pathfinder and its newly relaxed accuracy objective of 0.6% (k=2) from 2020 onwards, the resulting measurements may be able to detect climate change signals by the year 2039 (move Red curve to year 20 or '2020', rather than 0 start point in Fig. 3). However, since this will occur near a decade after year 31 or '2031' in Fig. 3 which is the NASA estimate of when CERES will detect such trends without the aid of CLARREO (grey dashed line), Pathfinder will likely be of much reduced benefit to climate science compared to the original 0.3% (k=2) concept in response to the 2007 decadal survey (with a 2013 launch date).

== Team ==
CLARREO was originally recommended as a joint NASA/NOAA mission where NOAA would contribute the total and spectral solar irradiance measurements and the Earth energy budget climate data records by flying the Total Solar Irradiance Sensor (TSIS) and the Clouds and the Earth's Radiant Energy System (CERES) sensors. The NASA portion involved the measurement of spectrally resolved thermal IR and reflected solar radiation at high absolute accuracy. However, recent events have put such allocations in question.

A team led by NASA Langley Research Center, with contributions from other NASA Centers, government organizations, academia, and NASA HQ, developed a mission concept that passed its Mission Concept Review (MCR) on November 17, 2010. Although the FY2012 budget cuts placed the full CLARREO mission into an extended pre-Phase A status, a CLARREO Science Definition Team, which had already been competitively selected, has continued to advance the science and technology development of the mission.

== See also ==
- TRUTHS
