= List of minor planets and comets visited by spacecraft =

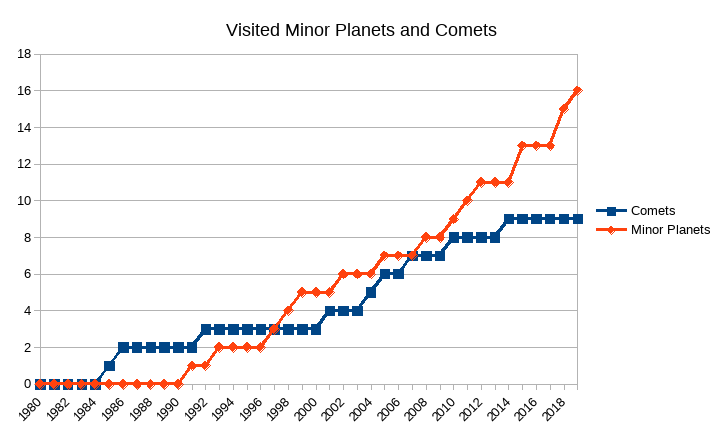
Number of minor planets and comets visited by spacecraft as of 2019

The following tables list all minor planets and comets that have been visited by robotic spacecraft.

== List of minor planets visited by spacecraft ==
A total of 21 minor planets (asteroids, dwarf planets, and Kuiper belt objects) have been visited by space probes. Moons (not directly orbiting the Sun) and planets are not minor planets and thus are not included in the table below.

Minor planet				Space probe				
Name	Image	Dimensions (km)^{(a)}	Discovery year	Name	Closest approach			Remarks
Name	Image	Dimensions (km)^{(a)}	Discovery year	Name	year	in km	in radii^{(b)}	Remarks
951 Gaspra		18.2 × 10.5 × 8.9 (12.2 km)	1916	Galileo	1991	1,600	262	Flyby; first asteroid visited by a spacecraft.
243 Ida		56 × 24 × 21 (28 km)	1884	Galileo	1993	2,390	152	Flyby; discovered Dactyl; first asteroid with a moon visited by a spacecraft, largest asteroid visited by spacecraft at the time.
253 Mathilde		66 × 48 × 46 (58 km)	1885	NEAR Shoemaker	1997	1,212	49.5	Flyby; largest asteroid visited by a spacecraft at the time.
433 Eros		34 × 11 × 11 (17 km)	1898	NEAR Shoemaker	1998–2001	landed	landed	1998 flyby; 2000 orbited (first asteroid studied from orbit); 2001 landing; first asteroid landing, first asteroid orbited by a spacecraft, first near-Earth asteroid (NEA) visited by a spacecraft.
9969 Braille		2.2 × 0.6 (1.6 km)	1992	Deep Space 1	1999	26	12.7	Flyby; followed by flyby of Comet Borrelly; failed to image it during closest approach, only taking images 14,000 km from the asteroid.
5535 Annefrank		4.0	1942	Stardust	2002	3,079	1,230	Flyby
25143 Itokawa		0.5 × 0.3 × 0.2 (350 meters)	1998	Hayabusa	2005	landed	landed	Landed; returned dust samples to Earth in 2010 - first sample return mission from asteroid; first asteroid visited by a non-NASA spacecraft.
2867 Šteins		4.6	1969	Rosetta	2008	800	302	Flyby; first asteroid visited by the ESA.
21 Lutetia		120 × 100 × 75 (100 km)	1852	Rosetta	2010	3,162	64.9	Flyby on 10 July 2010; largest asteroid visited by a spacecraft at the time.
4 Vesta		525.4	1807	Dawn	2011–2012	200 approx.	0.76	Space probe broke orbit on 5 September 2012 and headed to Ceres; first "big four" asteroid visited by a spacecraft, largest asteroid visited by a spacecraft at the time.
4179 Toutatis		2.45	1934	Chang'e 2	2012	3.2	0.70	Flyby; first asteroid visited by a Chinese probe.
1 Ceres		939.4	1801	Dawn	2015–2018	35	0.07	First "close up" picture of Ceres taken in December 2014; probe entered orbit in March 2015; first dwarf planet visited by a spacecraft, largest asteroid visited by a spacecraft.
134340 Pluto		2376.6	1930	New Horizons	2015	12,500	10.5	Flyby; first trans-Neptunian object visited, most distant object visited by a spacecraft (at the time of the visit).
162173 Ryugu		0.896	1999	Hayabusa2	2018–2019	landed	landed	Rendezvoused with asteroid from June 2018 to November 2019. Successful touchdowns to collect a sample in February and July 2019. Three landers and an explosive impactor successfully deployed to the surface. Returned dust samples to Earth in December 2020.
101955 Bennu		0.490	1999	OSIRIS-REx	2018–2020	landed	landed	Arrived on 3 December 2018; entered lowest orbit on 12 June 2019; smallest object to be orbited by spacecraft and closest ever orbit; touchdown on 20 October 2020 to collect sample.
486958 Arrokoth		36 × 18 × 10	2014	New Horizons	2019	3,500	380	Flew by Arrokoth (nicknamed Ultima Thule) on 1 January 2019, currently farthest object to be visited by a spacecraft.
65803 Didymos		0.78	1996	DART / LICIACube	2022	1.19	3.1	Asteroid of the near-Earth Apollo group; a flyby target; its moon Dimorphos being the kinetic impact target to test asteroid deflection
65803 Didymos		0.78	1996	Hera	2026–2027			Studying the results obtained by the NASA's DART impactor 4 years after its mission.
152830 Dinkinesh		0.738	1999	Lucy	2023	425	1,100	Flyby; discovered Selam; smallest main-belt asteroid to be visited by a spacecraft
52246 Donaldjohanson		8 × 3.5	1981	Lucy	2025	960	330	Flyby; main-belt asteroid and member of the Erigone family
469219 Kamoʻoalewa		0.0274	2016	Tianwen-2	2026–2027			Co-orbital near-Earth asteroid; sample return target and current smallest asteroid to ever be visited and ever be orbited by a spacecraft
98943 Torifune		0.476	2001	Hayabusa2♯	2026	TBD	TBD	Flyby; near-Earth asteroid of the Apollo group; closest asteroid flyby, extended mission target
Notes:^{a} A minor planet's dimensions may be described by x, y, and z axes instead of an (average) diameter due to its non-spherical, irregular shape.^{b} Closest approach given in multiples of the minor planet's mean radius · List ordered in ascending order by a minor planet's first visit.

=== Gallery ===
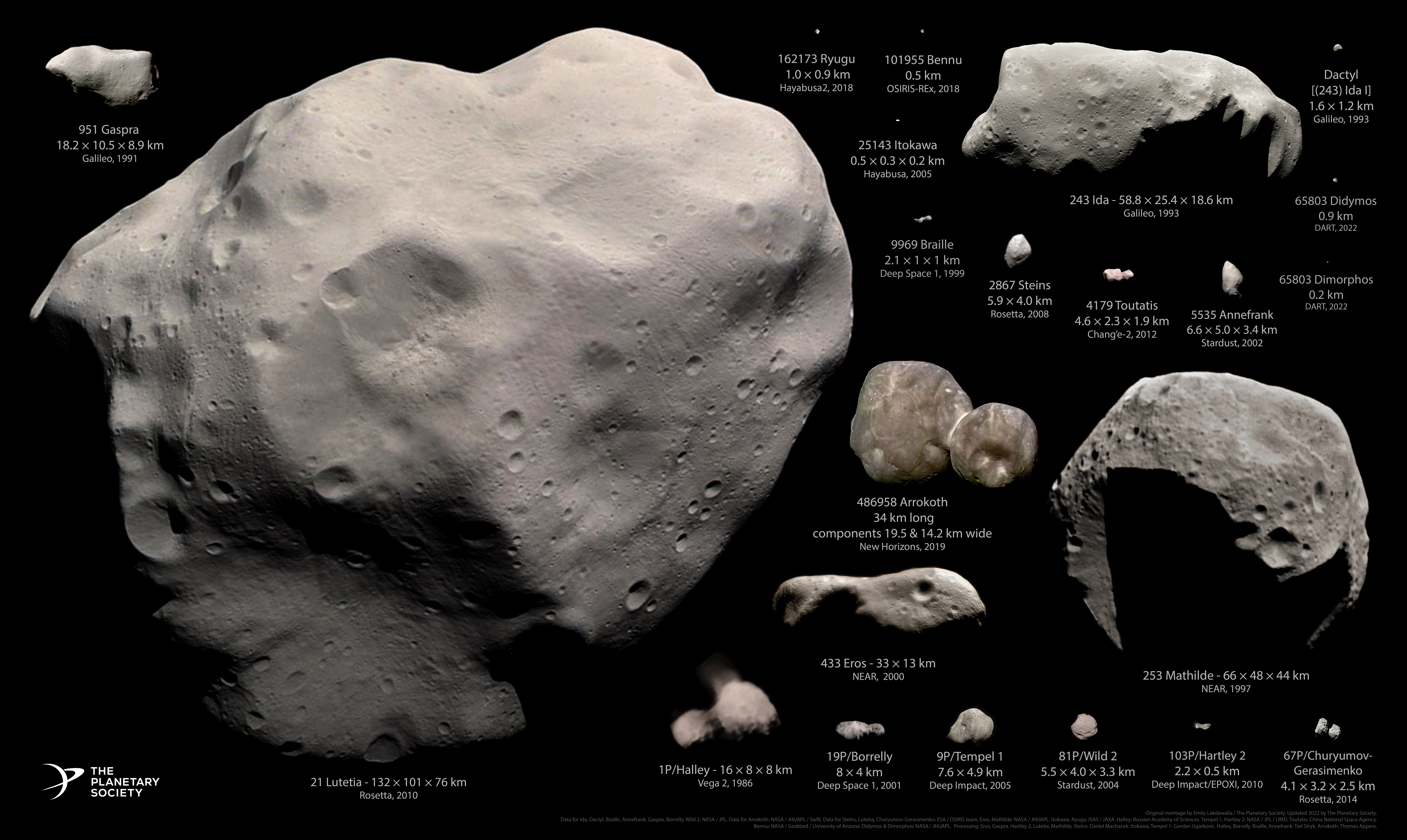
Minor planets and comets visited by spacecraft as of 2022 (except Pluto, Ceres, and Vesta), to scale

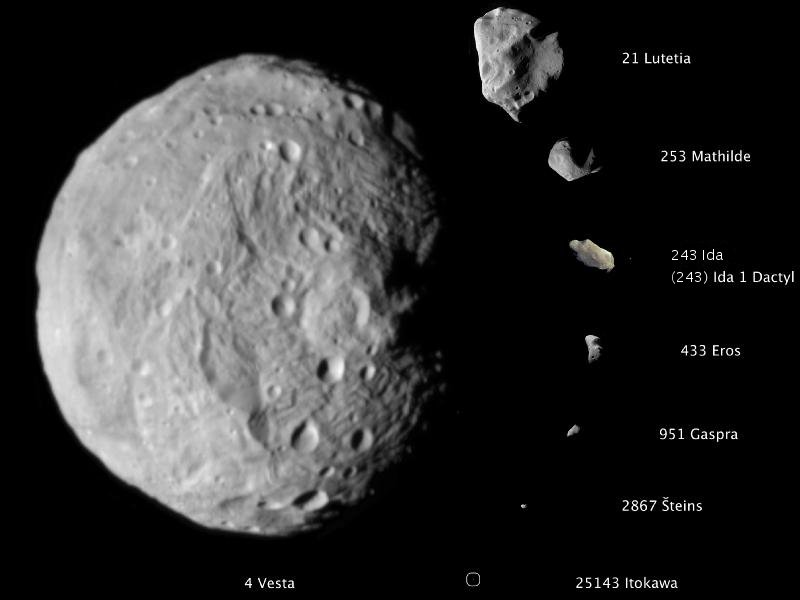
The comparative sizes of the first eight asteroids visited by spacecraft

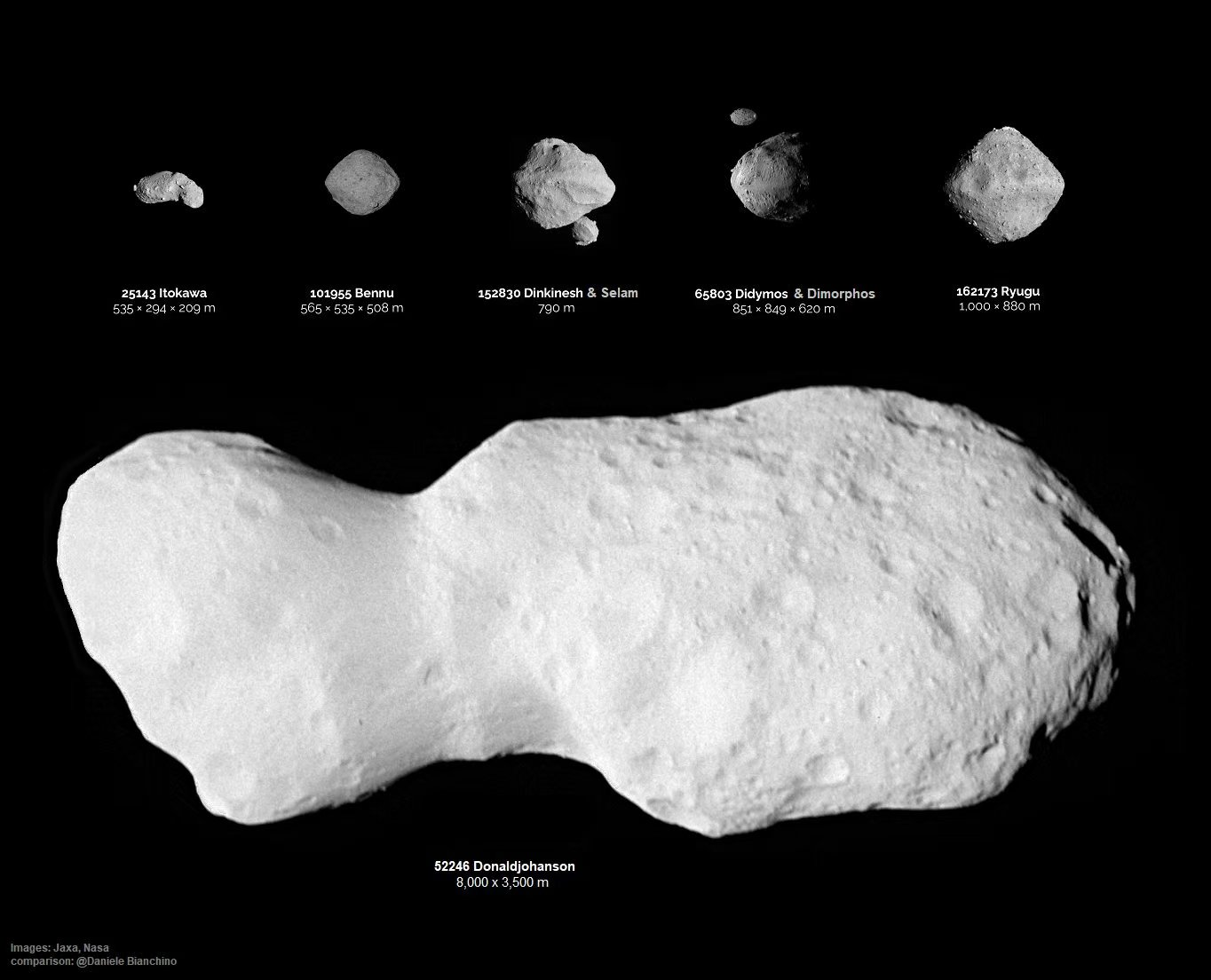
Comparison of asteroids visited by DART, Lucy, Hayabusa, Hayabusa2, and OSIRIS-REx

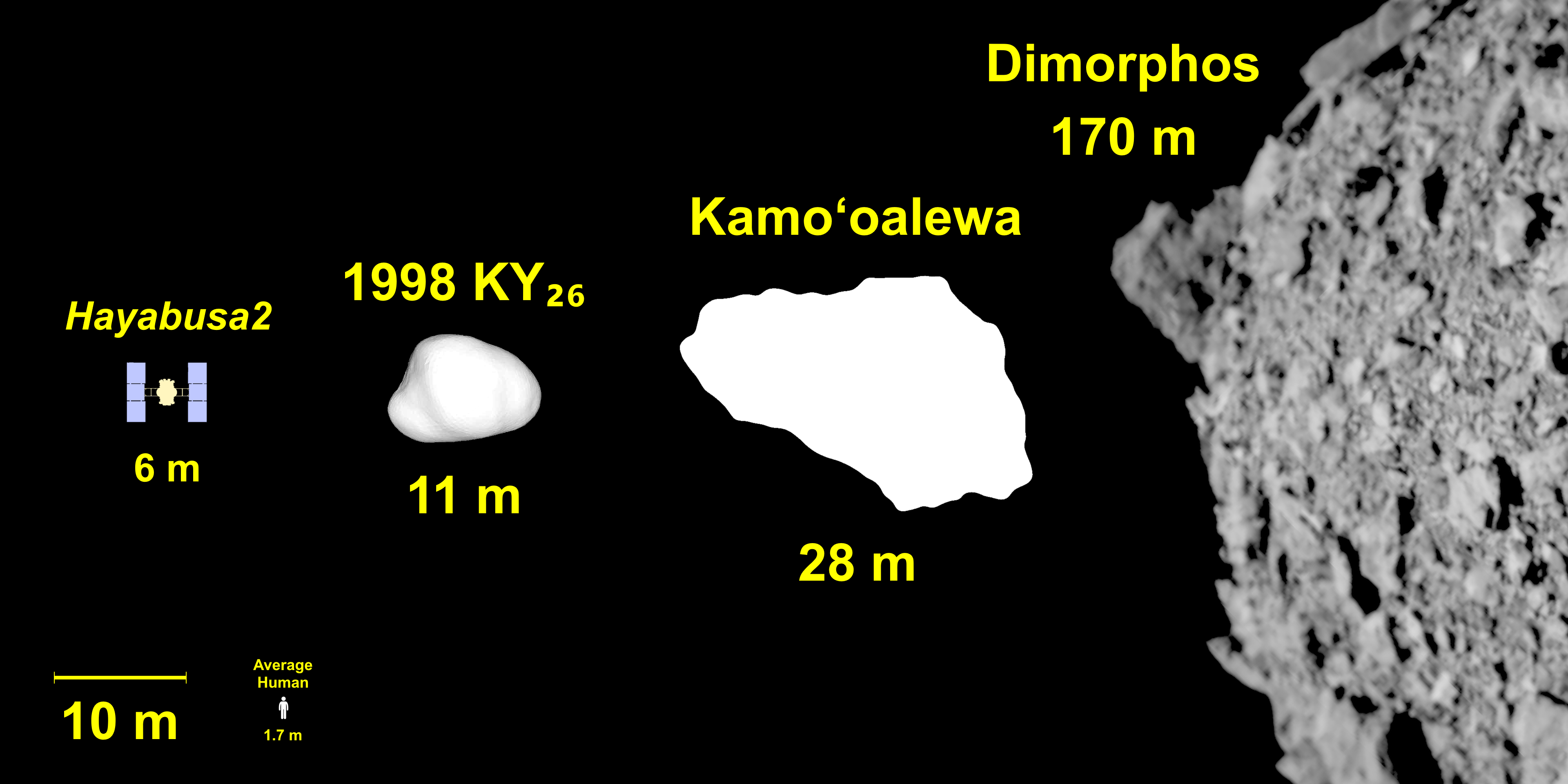
Comparison of the three smallest asteroids visited by spacecraft (except 1998 KY26) as of 2026, with the average human and Hayabusa2 shown for scale

=== Incidental flybys ===
In addition to the above listed objects, five asteroids have been imaged by spacecraft at distances too large to resolve features (over 100,000 km).

Minor planet				Space probe				
Name	Image	Dimensions (km)^{(a)}	Discovery year	Name	Closest approach			Remarks
Name	Image	Dimensions (km)^{(a)}	Discovery year	Name	year	in km	in radii^{(b)}	Remarks
2685 Masursky		10.7	1981	Cassini–Huygens	2000	1,600,000	297,840	Distant incidental flyby
132524 APL		2.5	2002	New Horizons	2006	101,867	81,493	Distant incidental flyby
(668956) 2012 PM35		0.9–2.5	2012	Dawn	2017	200,000	130,000	Distant incidental flyby; approached Ceres to 200,000 km in September 2017 while Dawn was in orbit.
1126 Otero		10	1926	Hera	2025	2,800,000	560,000	Distant incidental flyby
18805 Kellyday		4	1999	Hera	2025	6,000,000	3,000,000	Very distant incidental flyby

== List of comets visited by spacecraft ==
Comet				Space probe				
Name	Image	Dimensions (km)^{(a)}	Discovery year	Name	Closest approach			Remarks
Name	Image	Dimensions (km)^{(a)}	Discovery year	Name	year	in km	in radii^{(b)}	Remarks
21P/Giacobini–Zinner		2	1900	ICE	1985	7,800	7,800	First flyby of a comet
1P/Halley		15×9	Known since 1759 (Precovered to 240 BCE)	Vega 1	1986	8,889	1,620	flyby
1P/Halley		15×9	Known since 1759 (Precovered to 240 BCE)	Vega 2	1986	8,030	1,460	flyby
1P/Halley		15×9	Known since 1759 (Precovered to 240 BCE)	Suisei	1986	151,000	27,450	distant flyby
1P/Halley		15×9	Known since 1759 (Precovered to 240 BCE)	Sakigake	1986	6,990,000	1,270,747	distant flyby
1P/Halley		15×9	Known since 1759 (Precovered to 240 BCE)	Giotto	1986	596	108	flyby; first direct images of a comet nucleus
1P/Halley		15×9	Known since 1759 (Precovered to 240 BCE)	ICE	1986	31,000,000	5,647,000	distant flyby
26P/Grigg–Skjellerup		2.6	1902	Giotto	1992	200	154	flyby
19P/Borrelly		8×4×4	1904	Deep Space 1	2001	2,171	814	flyby; closest approach in September 2001 when probe entered the comet's coma
81P/Wild		5.5×4.0×3.3	1978	Stardust	2004	240	113	flyby; first sample return mission from comet to Earth (2006)
9P/Tempel		7.6×4.9	1867	Deep Impact	2005	500	80	flyby; delivered an impactor
9P/Tempel		7.6×4.9	1867	Deep Impact's impactor vehicle	2005	landed	landed	first landing on a comet (blasted a crater)
9P/Tempel		7.6×4.9	1867	Stardust	2011	181	57.9	flyby; imaged the crater created by Deep Impact
103P/Hartley		1.4	1986	EPOXI (Deep Impact)	2010	700	1,000	flyby; smallest comet visited
67P/Churyumov–Gerasimenko		4.1×3.3×1.8	1969	Rosetta	2016	landed	landed	first orbiter of comet (November 2014); impacted surface as of 2016; OSIRIS captured image with 11 cm/px-resolution in Spring 2015
67P/Churyumov–Gerasimenko		4.1×3.3×1.8	1969	Philae (Rosetta's lander)	2014	landed	landed	first soft landing on a comet (November 2014)
Notes:^{(a)}Due to a non-spherical, irregular shape, a comet's x, y, and z axes instead of an (average) diameter are often used to describe its dimensions.^{(b)}Closest approach given in multiples of the comet's (average mean) radius · List ordered in ascending order by a comet's first visit.

=== Gallery ===
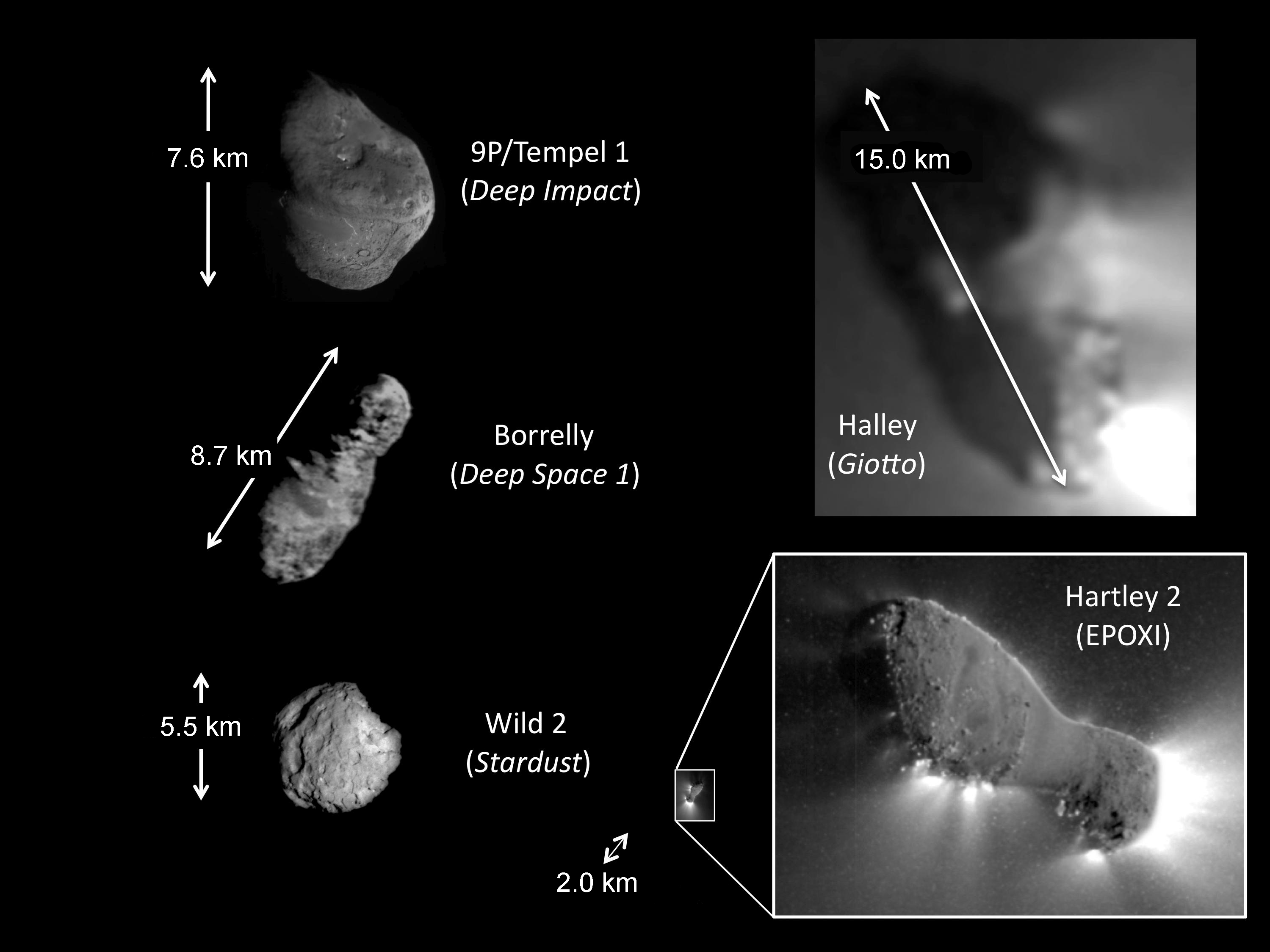
Comparison of the first five comets visited by spacecraft

=== Incidental flybys ===
Comet				Space probe				
Name	Image	Dimensions (km)^{(a)}	Discovery year	Name	Closest approach			Remarks
Name	Image	Dimensions (km)^{(a)}	Discovery year	Name	year	in km	in radii^{(b)}	Remarks
D/1895 Q1 (Swift)		unknown	1895	Mariner 4	1967	20,000,000	unknown	Unconfirmed. Reanalysis of the probe's trajectory in 2005 speculated the probe might have approached the comet's shattered nucleus, explaining the "meteor storm" it encountered.
322P/SOHO		0.15–0.32	1999	Parker Solar Probe	2019	1,800,000	5,625,000	

=== Spacecraft visited by comets ===
Comet C/2013 A1 passed close by planet Mars in October 2014, closer than the Moon is to Earth. As of early 2014 it was calculated to pass as close as 0.00087 AU (130,000 km; 81,000 mi). This was so close that the event was deemed dangerous to spacecraft in orbit around Mars. Spacecraft that were active at that time included 2001 Mars Odyssey, Mars Express, MAVEN, Mars Orbiter Mission, and Mars Reconnaissance Orbiter in Mars orbit – and two on the surface – Mars Exploration Rover Opportunity and the Mars Science Laboratory Curiosity.

== Future visits ==
=== Planned ===
Legend

En route
In development

Name	Diameter^{(a)} (km)	Year of discovery	Spacecraft	Encounter Date	Notes
Unknown near-Earth asteroid			M-Argo	As early as 2027	ESA CubeSat mission
3548 Eurybates	72	1973	Lucy	12 August 2027	Jupiter trojan with satellite, Greek camp
15094 Polymele	21	1999	Lucy	15 September 2027	Jupiter trojan with satellite, Greek camp
2015 BM510	0.017–0.074	2015	Hayabusa2♯	April 2028	Near-Earth asteroid of the Aten group; extended mission target
11351 Leucus	42	1997	Lucy	18 April 2028	Jupiter trojan, Greek camp, a slow rotator
21900 Orus	53	1999	Lucy	11 November 2028	Jupiter trojan, Greek camp
Unknown comet	TBD	TBD	Comet Interceptor	2029 – 2032	Will orbit at the Sun-Earth L_{2} point for up to three years to wait for a suitable long period comet that it can perform a flyby of
2016 WP8	0.04–0.06	2016	Unnamed CNSA mission	April 2029	Near-Earth asteroid of the Aten group, will be visited by an orbiter and impactor for an asteroid deflection test.
99942 Apophis	0.370	2004	OSIRIS-APEX	21 April 2029	Extended mission after sample delivery
99942 Apophis	0.370	2004	DESTINY^{+}	2029	Flyby before the Ramses mission
99942 Apophis	0.370	2004	Ramses	2029	
16 Psyche	186	1852	Psyche	5 August 2029	Large metallic main-belt asteroid
3200 Phaethon	5	1983	DESTINY^{+}	2030	Active near-Earth asteroid and parent body of Geminids meteor shower
10253 Westerwald	2.3	1973	MBR Explorer	February 2030	Flyby
623 Chimaera	22	1907	MBR Explorer	June 2030	Flyby
13294 Rockox	5.2	1998	MBR Explorer	January 2031	Flyby
88055 Ghaf	5.4	2000	MBR Explorer	July 2032	Flyby
23871 Ousha	6.7	1998	MBR Explorer	December 2032	Flyby
617 Patroclus–Menoetius	141	1906	Lucy	2 March 2033	Binary Jupiter trojan, Trojan camp, 5th-largest Jupiter trojan
59980 Moza	8.0	1999	MBR Explorer	August 2033	Flyby
311P/PanSTARRS	0.48	2013	Tianwen-2	24 January 2034	Active main-belt asteroid
269 Justitia	53.62	1887	MBR Explorer	October 2034	Orbit and landing
^{(a)} given diameters are estimates

=== Proposals ===
The following table lists minor planets and comets that are proposed to be visited by spacecraft missions that have not yet been approved.

Name	Diameter (km)	Year of discovery	Spacecraft	Proposed dates	Notes
99942 Apophis	0.370	2004	Satis	Launch: 2028; Flyby: 2029	ESA CubeSat proposal
(451124) 2009 KC_{3}	2.188	2009	NGSR	Launch: 2034	(Note: This is one of 5 proposed backup targets for the Next Generation Small-Body Sample Return (NGSR) mission in case the 2034 launch window to 289P/Blanpain was not achieved.)
2003 XM	–	2003	NGSR	Launch: 2036	
2016 LX_{48}	0.864	2016	NGSR	Launch: 2036	
7P/Pons–Winnecke	5.2	1819	Comet Interceptor	Launch: 2029; Flyby: 2033	(Note: This is one of 10 proposed backup targets for Comet Interceptor in case there was no suitable non-periodic comet were close enough for the probe to be able to visit it.)
8P/Tuttle	4.5	1858	Comet Interceptor	Launch: 2029; Flyby: 2035	
15P/Finlay	2.42	1886	Comet Interceptor	Launch: 2029; Flyby: 2034	
15P/Finlay	2.42	1886	NGSR	Launch: 2037	
21P/Giacobini–Zinner	2.0	1900	Comet Interceptor	Launch: 2029; Flyby: 2034	Previously visited by ICE in 1985.
26P/Grigg–Skjellerup	2.6	1902	Comet Interceptor	Launch: 2029; Flyby: 2034	Previously visited by Giotto in 1992.
67P/Churyumov–Gerasimenko	3.4	1969	Gelato	Launch: 2030; Arrival: 2038	NASA/JPL sample-return proposal. Previously visited by Rosetta and Philae in 2014–2016.
73P/Schwassmann–Wachmann	–	1930	Comet Interceptor	Launch: 2029; Flyby: 2033	Previously a target for the failed CONTOUR mission.
88P/Howell	1.92	1981	Gelato	Launch: 2030; Arrival: 2038	(Note: This is the proposed backup target for the Gelato mission in case the 2033 launch window to 67P/Churyumov–Gerasimenko was not achieved.)
189P/NEAT	0.128	2002	Comet Interceptor	Launch: 2029; Flyby: 2032	
252P/LINEAR	0.6	2000	NGSR	Launch: 2034	
289P/Blanpain	0.320	1819	NGSR	Launch: 2034; Arrival: 2040	JAXA sample-return proposal
289P/Blanpain	0.320	1819	Comet Interceptor	Launch: 2029; Flyby: 2035	
300P/Catalina	1.4	2005	Comet Interceptor	Launch: 2029; Flyby: 2036	
460P/PanSTARRS	1.1–1.6	2016	Comet Interceptor	Launch: 2029; Flyby: 2037	

== Past proposals ==
=== Failed or rerouted missions ===
Key
Spacecraft failure
Mission planning decisions

Former targets for launched spacecraft
Name	Diameter (km)	Date of discovery	Spacecraft	Year	Notes
2P/Encke	4.8	17 January 1786	CONTOUR	1998	Spacecraft lost while leaving Earth orbit
2P/Encke	4.8	17 January 1786	NEAR	1998	Target changed before launch
4 Vesta	525	29 March 1807	NEAR	1998	Target changed before launch
6P/d'Arrest	3.2	28 June 1851	CONTOUR	2008	Spacecraft lost while leaving Earth orbit
7P/Pons–Winnecke	5.2	12 June 1819	Mariner 5	1969	Target changed to Venus before launch
21P/Giacobini–Zinner	2	20 December 1900	Suisei	1998	Extended mission, spacecraft ran out of fuel en route.
29 Amphitrite	204	1 March 1854	Galileo	1986	Target changed due to launch postponement
46P/Wirtanen	1.2	17 January 1948	Rosetta	2011	Initial target, was changed due to delay.
73P/Schwassmann–Wachmann	1.1 (before breakup)	2 May 1930	CONTOUR	2006	Spacecraft lost while leaving Earth orbit
76P/West–Kohoutek–Ikemura	0.66	January 1975	Deep Space 1	2000	Target changed due to launch postponement
85D/Boethin		4 January 1975	EPOXI (Deep Impact)	2007	Astronomers were unable to locate the comet, which is too faint to be observed.
140 Siwa	103	13 October 1874	Rosetta	2007	Target changed due to launch postponement
145 Adeona	151	3 June 1875	Dawn	2016	Abandoned target (not seriously considered)
223 Rosa	82.7	9 March 1882	JUICE	2029	Secondary target; abandoned to conserve fuel for primary Jupiter orbiter mission.
1036 Ganymed	35	23 October 1924	NEAR	1998	Target changed before launch
1620 Geographos	5.1×1.8	14 September 1951	Clementine	1995	Mission failed before retargeting
2019 van Albada	7.5–9.4	28 September 1935	NEAR	1998	Target changed before launch
2101 Adonis	0.6	12 February 1936	Vega 2	1987	Secondary target; insufficient fuel
2530 Shipka	12.4	9 July 1978	Rosetta	2007	Secondary target; changed for better trajectory
2703 Rodari	9	29 March 1979	Rosetta	2007	Target in early mission planning, but not chosen
3352 McAuliffe	2–5	6 February 1981	Deep Space 1	1998	Target changed due to launch postponement
3840 Mimistrobell	5.2	9 October 1980	Rosetta	2007	Target changed
4015 Wilson–Harrington	4	19 November 1949	NEAR	1998	Target changed before launch
4015 Wilson–Harrington	4	19 November 1949	Deep Space 1	2001	Secondary target; abandoned due to instrument failure
4660 Nereus	~1	28 February 1982	NEAR	1997	Target changed before launch
4660 Nereus	~1	28 February 1982	Hayabusa	2002	Target changed due to launch postponement
4979 Otawara	5.5	2 August 1949	Rosetta	2007	Target changed due to launch postponement
(5604) 1992 FE	0.6	26 March 1992	OSIRIS-REx	2018	Secondary target abandoned in 2010 during early mission planning
7968 Elst–Pizarro	3.8 ± 0.6	1979	Tianwen-2	2030 or 2032	Target changed due to launch postponement
(10302) 1989 ML	0.6	29 June 1989	Hayabusa	2002	Target changed due to launch postponement
50000 Quaoar	1086	4 June 2002	Shensuo	2030s	Original mission concept included a proposed Quaoar flyby.
(163249) 2002 GT	0.35–0.5	3 April 2002	EPOXI (Deep Impact)	2020	Communications with spacecraft lost
(172034) 2001 WR1	0.66	17 November 2001	Hayabusa2	2023	Target proposed for extended mission but not selected.
(185851) 2000 DP107	~0.8	29 February 2000	PROCYON	2016	Ion engine failure in heliocentric orbit
1991 VG	0.005–0.012	6 November 1991	NEA Scout	2022	Target changed due to launch postponement
1998 KY26	0.011	1998	Hayabusa2	2031	Target changed due to engine problems
2001 AV43	0.03	5 January 2001	Hayabusa2	2029	Target proposed but not selected
2020 GE	0.018	2020	NEA Scout	2023	Communications with spacecraft lost
2022 OB5	0.004–0.010 (Note: Assuming a geometric albedo between 0.05–0.30)	2022	Odin	2025	Communications with spacecraft lost

=== Cancelled or not developed missions ===
Name	Diameter (km)	Date of discovery	Spacecraft	Year	Notes
1 Ceres	939	1 January 1801	Ceres Polar Lander		
1 Ceres	939	1 January 1801	Calathus		
2 Pallas	512	28 March 1802	Athena	2024	
4 Vesta	525	29 March 1807	AGORA	1990–1994	
4 Vesta	525	29 March 1807	MAOSEP	1990s	
4 Vesta	525	29 March 1807	Vesta	1994	
10P/Tempel	10.6	4 July 1873	CRAF	1996	Assumed a September 1992 launch
19 Fortuna	225	22 August 1852	CRAF	2002	Assumed an April 1997 launch
21P/Giacobini–Zinner	2.0	20 December 1900	Comet Explorer	1979	Not selected
22P/Kopff	3.0	23 August 1906	CRAF	2001	Assumed an April 1997 launch
22P/Kopff	3.0	23 August 1906	Odyssey	2009	Not selected
24 Themis	215	5 April 1853	Odyssey	2006–2008	Not selected
26P/Grigg–Skjellerup	2.6	23 July 1906	Comet Explorer	1977	Not selected
29P/Schwassmann–Wachmann	65	1927	Centaurus	Launch: 2026; Flyby: 2030s	Not selected
46 Hestia	124	16 August 1857	CRAF	1995	Assumed a September 1992 launch
46P/Wirtanen	1.2	17 January 1948	Comet Hopper	2022	
50 Virginia	99.8	1857	MANTIS	Launch: 2020s Flyby: 2020s	A flyby proposal of 14 asteroids, the largest being 50 Virginia.
67P/Churyumov–Gerasimenko	4.1×3.3×1.8	20 September 1969	CAESAR	2024	
67P/Churyumov–Gerasimenko	4.1×3.3×1.8	20 September 1969	CONDOR	2024	Proposed comet sample-return mission.
88 Thisbe	255	15 June 1866	CRAF	2001	Assumed an April 1997 launch
88P/Howell	4.4	1981	CORSAIR	2024	Proposed comet sample-return mission.
433 Eros	34 × 11 × 11	1898	Clementine 2	1996	
449 Hamburga	86	31 October 1899	CRAF	1998	
1415 Malautra	7.4	4 March 1937	CRAF	1993	Assumed a September 1992 launch
2060 Chiron	271	1977	Centaurus	Launch: 2026; Flyby: 2030s	A flyby proposal
4015 Wilson–Harrington	4	19 November 1949	Marco Polo/Hayabusa Mk2	2022	
4179 Toutatis	2.45	1934	Clementine 2	1996	
4660 Nereus	~1	28 February 1982	NEAP	1997	
7968 Elst–Pizarro or 133P/Elst–Pizarro	~0.6	24 July 1979	Caroline	2025	Assumed a 2021 launch, and an Earth return by 2027.
7968 Elst–Pizarro or 133P/Elst–Pizarro	~0.6	24 July 1979	Castalia	2028	
10199 Chariklo	260.35	1997	Camilla	Launch: 2026; Flyby: 2039	A mission concept for a flyby and impactor.
25143 Itokawa	0.5 × 0.3 × 0.2	1998	Asteroid Redirect Mission	2021	
(35107) 1991 VH	1.04	9 November 1991	Janus	2026	Launch delayed, target not available
47171 Lempo	272	1 October 1999	New Horizons 2		
55637 Uni	~0.69	30 October 2002	New Horizons 2		
(65679) 1989 UQ			Marco Polo	2018–2020	
66652 Borasisi	163	8 September 1999	New Horizons 2		
99942 Apophis	0.37	19 June 2004	Don Quijote	2015	
101955 Bennu	0.490	1999	Asteroid Redirect Mission	2021	
101955 Bennu	0.490	1999	HAMMER		
134340 Pluto	2376	18 February 1930	Pluto Kuiper Express	2004	
(153591) 2001 SN263	2.6	20 September 2001	ASTER	2027	Brazilian Space Agency mission to triple near-Earth asteroid system of the Amor group
162173 Ryugu	0.9	10 May 1999	Marco Polo	2018–2020	
162173 Ryugu	0.9	10 May 1999	Asteroid Redirect Mission	2021	
(162998) 2001 SK162			Marco Polo	2018–2020	
(175706) 1996 FG3	1.69	24 March 1996	Janus	2026	Launch delayed, target not available
(175706) 1996 FG3	1.7	24 March 1996	Marco Polo	2018–2020	
(341843) 2008 EV5	0.4	4 March 2008	Marco Polo	2018–2020	
(341843) 2008 EV5	0.4	4 March 2008	Asteroid Redirect Mission	2021	
(612267) 2001 SG286			Marco Polo	2018–2020	
(612600) 2003 SM84	0.086–0.16	20 September 2003	Don Quijote	2015	
Trojan asteroids		1906	OKEANOS	Launch: 2026	Proposed multiple flyby mission to Jupiter's Trojan asteroids using solar sail propulsion.

== See also ==
- List of missions to minor planets
- List of missions to comets
- List of missions to the outer planets
- List of Solar System probes
- List of landings on extraterrestrial bodies
- List of extraterrestrial orbiters
- Missions to the moons of Mars
