= List of proposed Solar System probes =

There are currently various proposed space probes to focus on the exploration of the Solar System. For planned missions to the Moon see the dedicated list of missions to the Moon, with its section future missions. Launched probes are in the List of Solar System probes and the List of active Solar System probes.

== Scheduled missions ==
Mission name	Launch date	Target	Description	Ref(s)
(Europe) M-Argo	2027	Asteroid	Cubesat mission to a near-Earth asteroid	
(United States) DeepSpace-2	2027	Asteroid	Rendezvous with near-Earth asteroid	
(Japan) DESTINY^{+}	2028	Asteroid	Asteroid 3200 Phaethon flyby	
(United States) Dragonfly	July 2028	Saturn / Titan	Titan rotorcraft lander	
(Europe) Rosalind Franklin	2028	Mars	Mars rover, ExoMars	
(United States) Relativity Space Mars science orbiter	2028	Mars	Orbiter carrying NASA's Aeolus atmospheric science instrument suite	
(China) Tianwen-3	2028	Mars	Mars sample return mission	
(United Arab Emirates) MBR Explorer	2028	Asteroid	Flyby mission to seven asteroids	
(United States) Mars Telecommunications Network	2028	Mars	Orbiter	
(Europe) (Japan) Ramses	2028	Asteroid	Orbiter	
(India) Venus Orbiter Mission	2028	Venus	Orbiter	
(United States) Space Reactor‑1 Freedom / SkyFall	2028	Mars	Mars helicopters	
(China) Solar Polar Orbit Observatory	January 2029	Jupiter	High-inclination solar orbiter, Jupiter flyby	
(China) Tianwen-4	September 2029	Jupiter / Callisto	Callisto orbiter and Callisto lander	
(Europe) (Japan) Comet Interceptor	2029	Comet	Flyby of an Oort Cloud comet	
(United States) DAVINCI	2030	Venus	Orbiter and atmospheric probe	
(India) Mangalyaan-2	2031	Mars	Orbiter and lander	
(Europe) EnVision	2032	Venus	Orbiter	
(United States) VERITAS	2032	Venus	Orbiter	

== Proposed missions ==
Mission name	Preliminary launch date estimate			Target	Description	Ref(s)
Mission name	Estimated launch date	Estimate by	Estimate as of	Target	Description	Ref(s)
(China) Asteroid deflection mission	2027	CNSA	2025	Asteroid	Asteroid deflection mission; possible target is 2015 XF261 or 2016 WP8	
(Japan) OPENS-0	NET 2028	JAXA	2026	Saturn	Saturn flyby, executing studies of Saturn's rings.	
(Russia) MKA MGU-Apophis	End of 2028-2029	Moscow State University	2026	Asteroid	Spacecraft to study 99942 Apophis at close range	
(United States) (New Zealand) Venus Life Finder	Originally planned to launch in 2023, then moved to 2026, and now awaits Neutron rocket readiness.			Venus	Atmospheric probe by Rocket Lab and MIT	
(Japan) Tera-hertz Explorer	Originally planned to be launched in "2020s". There are no updates after 2021.			Mars	Orbiter and lander	
(United States) Uranus Orbiter and Probe	NET 2031	NASA	2023	Uranus	Orbiter and probe	
(United Kingdom) VERVE	2032	Cardiff University	2026	Venus	Proposed CubeSat piggybacking on EnVision, to conduct its own orbital investigation	
(China) Shensuo	2032		2026	Outer planets	"Voyager-like" mission to outer planets	
(China) Venus atmospheric sample return	2033	DSEL/CNSA	2025	Venus	Atmospheric sample return from Venus	
(Japan) Next Generation Small-Body Sample Return	2034	JAXA	2026	Comet	Comet sample return mission; main target - comet 289P/Blanpain.	
(United States) Interstellar Probe	2036	NASA	2022	Outer planets	"Voyager on steroids"	
(Russia) Venera-D	2036	Russian Academy of Sciences	2025	Venus	Orbiter and lander	
(United States) Enceladus Orbilander	2038	NASA	2023	Saturn / Enceladus	Enceladus orbiter/lander	
(China) Mars Research Station for ISRU	2038	DSEL/CNSA	2025	Mars	Mars surface research station for In-Situ Resource Utilization (ISRU)	
(China) Probe to Neptune and Triton	2039	DSEL/CNSA	2025	Neptune / Triton	Exploration of Neptune and its moon Triton	
(Europe) L4 (Probe to Enceladus)	2042	ESA	2024	Saturn / Enceladus	Orbiter and Enceladus lander	

== Suspended missions ==
The following missions were suspended or cancelled because of political, budgetary, or other reasons. The spacecraft were already assembled at the time of suspension/cancellation, so these missions can be resumed.

Mission name	Cancellation date	Description	Status and reason	Ref(s)
(Russia) Kazachok	2022	Mars Lander, ExoMars	During the Russian Invasion of Ukraine, the European Space Agency voted to suspend their cooperation with Russia on the ExoMars mission, it was returned to Roscosmos on October 2024. In 2022, Dmitry Rogozin announced that in a few years, Roscosmos would duplicate the Kazachok lander and launch it on the Angara rocket to Mars independently, however, this has not been publicly scheduled.	
(United States) Janus	2023	Dual asteroids probe	Was expected to be a secondary payload on the Psyche launch. After the delay, it was assessed that Janus wouldn't be able to reach the required trajectory. Both spacecraft were placed into long-term storage. It has been proposed that the spacecraft be used for 99942 Apophis.	

== See also ==
- Timeline of Solar System exploration
- Planned space telescopes
- Proposed space telescopes
- Planned heliophysics missions
- Planned Earth observation satellites
- Planned Moon missions
- Planned Venus missions
- Planned Mars missions
- Planned outer planets missions
- Future visits of minor planets and comets
- Future and proposed missions to be placed at Lagrange points
