= 15P/Finlay =

Jupiter-family comet

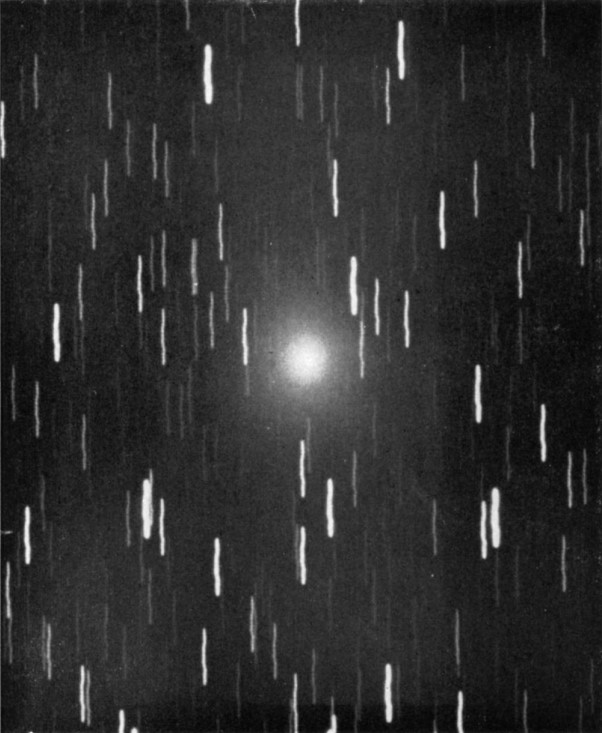
- Comet Finlay photographed from the US Naval Observatory on 26 September 1960

Discovery
- Discovered by: William Henry Finlay
- Discovery site: Royal Observatory, South Africa
- Discovery date: 26 September 1886

Designations
- MPC designation: P/1886 S1, P/1893 K1
- Alternative designations: 1886 VII, 1893 III, 1906 V; 1919 II, 1926 V, 1953 VII; 1960 VIII, 1967 IX, 1974 X; 1981 XII, 1988 IX

Orbital characteristics
- Epoch: 21 November 2025 (JD 2461000.5)
- Observation arc: 135.43 years
- Number of observations: 2,062
- Aphelion: 6.025 AU
- Perihelion: 0.997 AU
- Semi-major axis: 3.511 AU
- Eccentricity: 0.71595
- Orbital period: 6.58 years
- Inclination: 6.786°
- Longitude of ascending node: 13.734°
- Argument of periapsis: 347.87°
- Mean anomaly: 238.54°
- Last perihelion: 13 July 2021
- Next perihelion: 9 February 2028
- T_{Jupiter}: 2.619
- Earth MOID: 0.009 AU
- Jupiter MOID: 0.162 AU

Physical characteristics
- Mean radius: 1.21 km (0.75 mi)
- Geometric albedo: 0.035±0.012 (assumed)
- Comet total magnitude (M1): 14.9

Comet Finlay, also known as 15P/Finlay, is a Jupiter-family comet with an orbital period of 6.58 years. It discovered by William Henry Finlay from the Royal Observatory at Cape of Good Hope, South Africa on 26 September 1886. Of the known numbered periodic comets, the orbit of 15P/Finlay has one of the smallest minimum orbit intersection distances with Earth's orbit (E-MOID). In October 2060, the comet will pass about 5 million km (3.1 million mi; 13 LD) from Earth.

== Observational history ==
Perihelion distance at different epochs
| Epoch | Perihelion (AU) |
| 1866 | 1.0 |
| 1906 | 0.96 |
| 1919 | 1.0 |
| 1981 | 1.1 |
| 2008 | 0.97 |
| 2021 | 0.99 |
| 2028 | 1.0 |

When the first orbit calculations were made in 1886, there was a similarity between this orbit and that of Francesco de Vico's lost comet of 1844. (Note: This comet was later known to be 54P/de Vico–Swift–NEAT in 1965 and 2002, respectively) Lewis Boss noted large discrepancies between the orbits and after further observations concluded that de Vico's comet could not be the same as Finlay's.

During the 1906 apparition, the comet brightened to magnitude 6. In 1910 a close pass with Jupiter increased the orbital period, in 1919 the path was off predictions and a new comet discovered by Sasaki (Kyoto Observatory, Japan) on 25 October 1919, was discovered to be Finlay's.

The magnitude of the comet declined after 1926, and it was not until 1953 that it has been observed on every return.

=== 2014–2015 ===
During the 2014 perihelion passage the comet outburst on 16 December 2014 from magnitude 11 to magnitude 9 becoming bright enough to be seen in common binoculars with a 50 mm objective lens. On December 23, 2014, 15P and Mars were only 1/6 of a degree apart in the sky after sunset. But by December 23, 2014, the comet had dimmed considerably since the outburst. On 16 January 2015, the comet outburst to magnitude 8.

=== 2060 ===
15P/Finlay currently has an Earth-MOID of 0.009 AU (1.3 million km; 0.84 million mi). The comet will come to perihelion six more times and then on October 22, 2060, the comet will pass roughly 0.0334 AU (5.00 million km; 3.10 million mi) from Earth with an uncertainty region of about ±2300 km. This will be one of the closest comet approaches to Earth.

== Physical characteristics ==
In 2004, Jakub Cerny estimated that the nucleus of 15P/Finlay has an upper limit of about 1.5 km (0.93 mi) using non-gravitational forces to determine it. However this was uncertain as it assumed a nearly 10% active surface fraction upon perihelion. Photometric data in 2000 obtained an absolute magnitude of 17.2, which corresponds to a much larger nucleus at 2.42 km (1.50 mi) assuming its geometric albedo is around 0.035.

== Arids meteor shower ==
Debris ejected during the 1995 perihelion passage generated a meteor shower on 29–30 September 2021 radiating from the southern constellation of Ara. More outbursts are expected on 7 October 2021 from the 2008 and 2014 streams.

A 2026 study confirmed that this meteor shower was successfully detected at the Mauna Kea Observatory in Hawaii, where the source was attributed to have originated from dust ejected during the 2014 apparition of Finlay. However the study also noted that the 2008 apparition was exceptionally quiet, making it unlikely to have produced high-velocity dust that could have contributed to the 2021 meteor shower as the 2014 apparition did.

== Exploration ==
15P/Finlay is not yet visited by any spacecraft, but two proposals considering this comet as a potential target for exploration were published. A 2020 study places Finlay as one of 10 backup targets for the European Space Agency's Comet Interceptor mission in case a suitable non-periodic comet to flyby was not found. In 2025, the proposed JAXA mission, the Next Generation Small-Body Sample Return (NGSR), selected Finlay as one of five backup targets in case 289P/Blanpain is unreachable.

Assuming a 2029 launch, Comet Interceptor could make a flyby of Finlay by September 2034. On the other hand, if NGSR is targeted towards 15P, it could launch by 2037 and rendezvous with the comet following an Earth-Venus-Earth-Earth (EVEE) trajectory.

== Notes ==
Numbered comets
| Previous; 14P/Wolf | 15P/Finlay | Next; 16P/Brooks |
