= William Henry Finlay =

South African astronomer (1849–1924)

- Born: 17 June 1849; Liverpool
- Died: 7 December 1924 (aged 75); Grahamstown, South Africa
- Education: Trinity College, Cambridge; University of the Cape of Good Hope
- Known for: Periodic comet 15P/Finlay
- Scientific career
- Fields: Astronomy

William Henry Finlay (FRAS) (17 June 1849, in Liverpool – 7 December 1924, in Grahamstown, South Africa) was a South African astronomer. He was First Assistant at the Cape Observatory from 1873 to 1898 under Edward James Stone. He discovered the periodic comet 15P/Finlay. Earlier, he was one of the first to spot the "Great Comet of 1882" (C/1882 R1). The first telegraphic determinations of longitude along the western coast of Africa were made by Finlay and T. F. Pullen.

== Life and work ==
Finlay was educated at Liverpool College, completed a BA with honours (Mathematics) at Trinity College, Cambridge in 1873 and then a Master's degree also from Trinity College. Although he was not an astronomer, on the strength of his mathematical ability he was appointed first assistant at the Royal Observatory, Cape of Good Hope in April 1873, under the direction of Edward James Stone. His first duties were the reduction of the meridian observations of the previous director, Thomas Maclear. In November 1873 he was elected a fellow of the Royal Astronomical Society. From initially being inexperienced in practical astronomy he went on to become an expert in the use of the Heliometer.

His chief interest was comets and in March 1880 he presented a paper on them before the South African Philosophical Society. He wrote more than 10 papers on the observations and orbits of comets. He was the first astronomer to record observations of the "Great Comet of 1882" (C/1882 R1), and he presented his findings to the South African Philosophical Society in October 1882. On 6 December 1882, Finlay and Robert T. Pett, the third assistant at the Royal Observatory, observed the transit of Venus from a temporary observatory they had erected at the instruction of David Gill (director of the Royal Observatory from 1879). In September 1886, Finlay discovered another comet and computed its orbit. This comet is named Comet Finlay (15P/Finlay) after him.

His other astronomical work included the preparation of star correction tables and determination of Stellar parallaxes, in collaboration with David Gill. In 1887 he undertook an analysis of the tidal records of Table Bay and Algoa Bay. He also was involved in the determination of the relative longitudes of Cape Town, Aden, Delagoa Bay, Quelimane and Zanzibar. He also participated in the measurement of a baseline near Kimberley, Northern Cape in 1891.

From 1880 to 1889 Finlay acted as an examiner for mathematics and physics at the University of the Cape of Good Hope (UCGH). In 1886 UCGH awarded him a Master's degree in mathematics.

Finlay became chief assistant at the Royal Observatory in 1897 but was forced to retire in August 1898 owing to poor health. He went to England to recuperate but returned to South Africa. He left retirement and stood in as professor of mathematics at the South African College in 1909, on behalf of T.P Kent. In 1914 he replaced David Williams at Rhodes University College and taught mathematics and surveying. From 1913 to 1915 Finlay acted as examiner in mathematics at the University of the Cape of Good Hope. He continued to work up until his death in 1923.

== Memberships and recognition ==
- 1873 Fellow of the Royal Astronomical Society.
- 1875 Meteorological Commission of the Cape of Good Hope
- 1877 Member of the South African Philosophical Society (later General Secretary and President)

== Publications ==
- On the variations of the instrumental adjustments of the Cape transit-circle. Annals of the Cape Observatory, vol. 1, pt. 5. 1885.
- Telegraphic determinations of the longitudes of Lourenco Marques (Delagoa Bay), Mozambique, and Zanzibar, and the longitude of Quilimane. Annals of the Cape Observatory, vol. 1, pt. 3. 1886.
- with T. F. Pullen: Telegraphic Determinations of Longitudes on the West Coast of Africa. London: Hydrographic Department, Admiralty. 1891.
- Star-correction Tables. London: H.M.'s Stationery Office. 1895.
- Finlay, W.H. (1884). "On the variations of level of the Cape transit circle". Transactions of the South African Philosophical Society. 4 (1): 6–10. doi:10.1080/21560382.1884.9526191.
