= 7P/Pons–Winnecke =

Jupiter-family comet

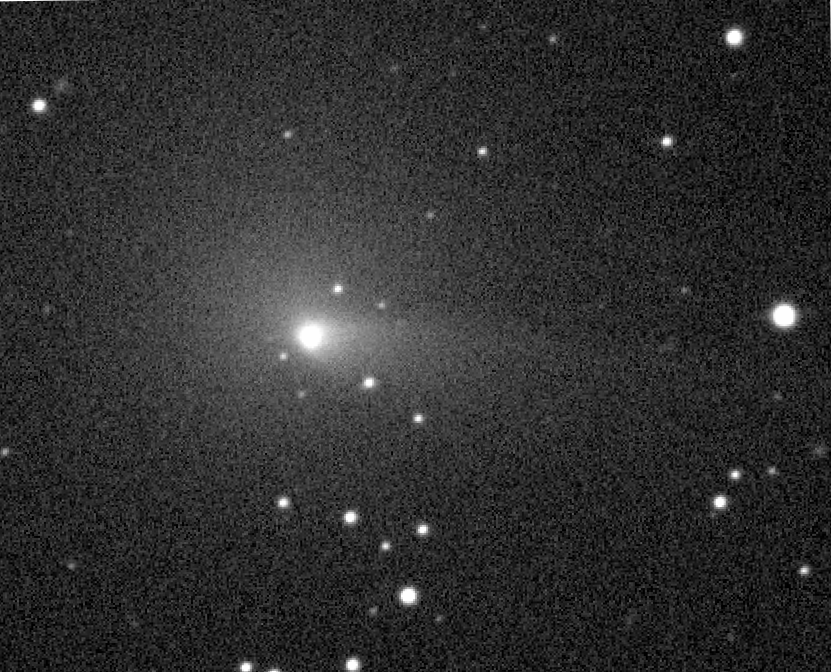
- Comet Pons–Winnecke as seen in 2021 by ZTF

Discovery
- Discovered by: Jean Louis Pons; Friedrich Winnecke
- Discovery site: Marseille, France; Bonn, Germany
- Discovery date: 12 June 1819; 9 March 1858

Designations
- MPC designation: P/1819 L1, P/1858 E1; P/1869 G1
- Alternative designations: 1819 III, 1858 II, 1869 I; 1875 I, 1886 VI, 1892 IV; 1898 II, 1909 II, 1915 III; 1921 III, 1927 VII, 1933 II; 1939 V, 1945 IV, 1951 VI; 1964 I, 1970 VIII; 1976 XIV, 1983 IV; 1989 VIII

Orbital characteristics
- Epoch: 21 November 2025 (JD 2461000.5)
- Observation arc: 206.61 years (Note: Observation arc from the Minor Planet Center database only covered dates from 26 September 1892 until 20 January 2026 (133.32 years). This figure includes its entire arc up to 12 June 1819.)
- Number of observations: 1,810
- Aphelion: 5.568 AU
- Perihelion: 1.145 AU
- Semi-major axis: 3.357 AU
- Eccentricity: 0.6388
- Orbital period: 6.15 years
- Inclination: 22.249°
- Longitude of ascending node: 93.06°
- Argument of periapsis: 173.52°
- Mean anomaly: 257.13°
- Last perihelion: 27 May 2021
- Next perihelion: 25 August 2027
- T_{Jupiter}: 2.677
- Earth MOID: 0.226 AU (33.8 million km)
- Jupiter MOID: 0.273 AU (40.8 million km)

Physical characteristics
- Mean diameter: 5.2 km (3.2 mi)
- Mean density: 540±80 kg/m^{3}
- Synodic rotation period: 6.8–9.5 hours
- Geometric albedo: 0.04 (assumed)
- Spectral type: (V–R) = 0.40±0.05 (R–I) = 0.41±0.06
- Comet total magnitude (M1): 16.0

7P/Pons–Winnecke (also known as Comet Pons–Winnecke) is a Jupiter-family comet roughly 5 km in diameter that takes six-years to orbit the Sun. The next perihelion passage is 25 August 2027 when the comet will have a solar elongation of 63 degrees.

== Observational history ==
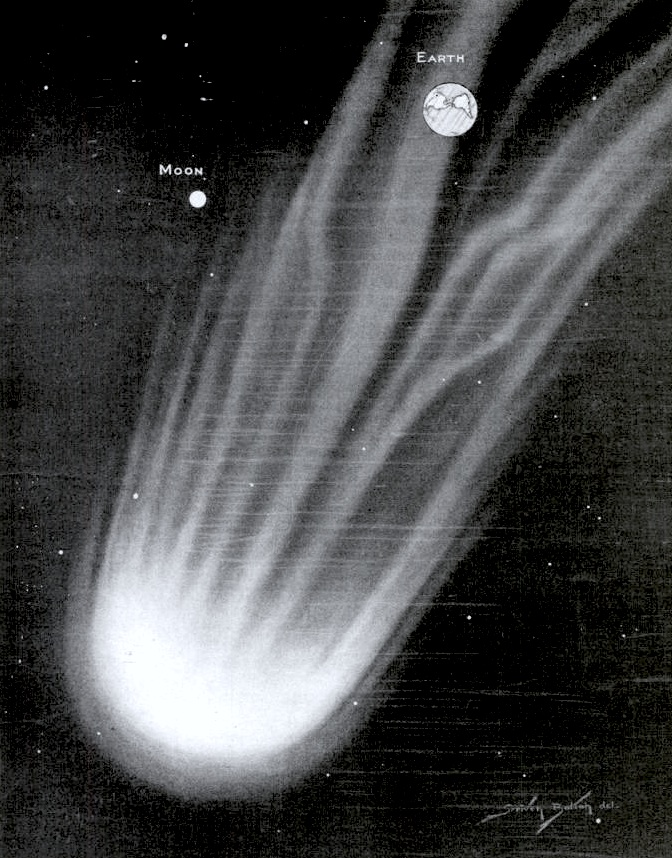
An illustration of Pons–Winnecke approaching the Earth in 1921.

Jean Louis Pons (Marseille) originally discovered the comet on 12 June 1819, it was later rediscovered by Friedrich Winnecke (Bonn) on 9 March 1858.

Early calculations for the 1921 apparition suggested that the orbit of the comet might collide with Earth in June, but observations on 10 April ruled out an impact. It made a very close approach to Earth in June 1927.

During its 2021 apparition, eight outbursts were recorded, most of which are ten times greater than observed from other comets like 49P/Arend–Rigaux.

== Orbit ==
7P currently has an orbital period of 6.2 years. It currently has a perihelion of 1.1 AU (outside the orbit of Earth) and an aphelion of 5.6 AU (past the orbit of Jupiter). It passed within 0.04 AU (6.0 million km) of Earth in June 1927, and 0.1 AU (15 million km) in 1939; but it will not come as close in the 21st century. A close approach to Jupiter in July 2037 will drop perihelion to 0.982 AU, and by 2062 perihelion will be further reduced to 0.85 AU.

7P/Pons–Winnecke closest Earth approach on 2062-Jun-12
Date & time of closest approach	Earth distance (AU)	Sun distance (AU)	Velocity wrt Earth (km/s)	Velocity wrt Sun (km/s)	Uncertainty region (3-sigma)	Reference
2062-Jun-12 18:25 ± 10 min	0.1676 AU (25.07 million km; 15.58 million mi; 65.2 LD)	0.8499 AU (127.14 million km; 79.00 million mi; 330.8 LD)	16.3	42.5	± 312 km	Horizons

The last perihelion passage was 27 May 2021 when the comet had a solar elongation of 107 degrees at approximately apparent magnitude 11.< It passed 0.44 AU (66 million km) from Earth on 12 June 2021. Before that it came to perihelion on 30 January 2015 with a solar elongation of 24 degrees.

== Physical characteristics ==
Perihelion distance at different epochs
Epoch	Perihelion (AU)
1819	0.77
1875	0.83
1886	0.89
1898	0.92
1909	0.97
1921	1.04
1933	1.10
1989	1.26
2027	1.13
2039	0.982
2062	0.847

The comet nucleus is estimated to be 5.2 km (3.2 mi) in diameter. Photometric measurements from the European Southern Observatory (ESO) reveals that the comet exhibited brightness variations, which imply that its rotation period is roughly between 6.8 and 9.5 hours. Dust production rate was measured to be less than 150 kg/s (330 lb/s) during its 2021 apparition. Its gas composition based on observations conducted at the Calar Alto Observatory in Spain determined that Pons–Winnecke has a typical composition found in other Jupiter-family comets with some depletion in C_{3} compounds, and a dust-to-mass ratio of 2, suggesting a dust-rich composition for the comet as well.

== Meteor shower ==
Comet Pons–Winnecke is the progenitor of the June Boötids meteor shower, (Note: Also known as the Draconids.) which is annually seen around June 22 to July 2, with peak activity around June 28. Unlike other meteor showers, the June Bootids are known to be noticeably unpredictable, with activity as low as 2 meteors per hour to outbursts up to 100 meteors per hour. The outward migration of perihelion created impressive meteor showers in 1916, 1921 and 1927. An outburst in 1998 produced around 200 meteors per hour at its peak. Large meteoroids from this shower have also produced occasional fireballs and bolides, two of which reached magnitude -20 and -9 in July 2008 and July 2009 respectively.

== Proposed exploration ==
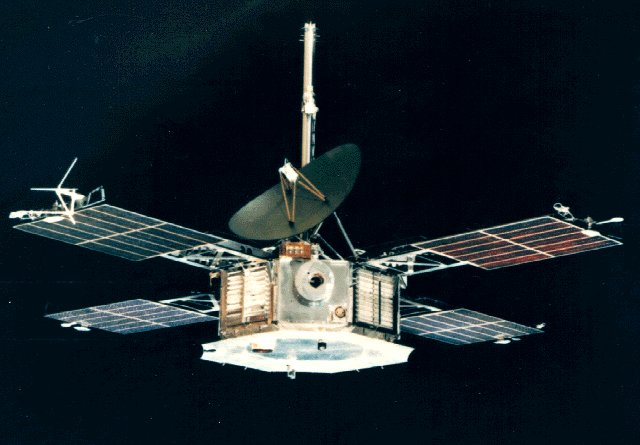
Mariner 5

The Jet Propulsion Laboratory proposed a flyby of the comet with a flight spare of Mariner 4 with the closest approach taking place in 1969 at a distance of 5,000 km (3,100 mi). However, the intrinsically faint comet's ephemeris was poorly defined at the time, making it difficult to track its position optically from the ground. The probe was instead used for a 1967 Venus flyby as Mariner 5.

In 2019, 7P/Pons–Winnecke was listed as one of 10 backup targets of the European Space Agency's Comet Interceptor mission. Scheduled for launch on 2029, the spacecraft may conduct a flyby of 7P on 28 September 2033 if selected.

== Notes ==
Numbered comets
Previous; 6P/d'Arrest	7P/Pons–Winnecke	Next; 8P/Tuttle
