= 300P/Catalina =

Jupiter-family comet

Discovery
- Discovery site: Catalina Sky Survey
- Discovery date: 6 May 2005

Designations
- MPC designation: P/2005 JQ_{5} P/2014 G2
- Alternative designations: Catalina 3

Orbital characteristics
- Epoch: 6 April 2023<≠
- Observation arc: 13.6 years
- Aphelion: 4.565 AU (Q)
- Perihelion: 0.83207 AU (q)
- Semi-major axis: 2.6985 AU (a)
- Eccentricity: 0.69165
- Orbital period: 4.43 years
- Inclination: 5.6740°
- Last perihelion: 11 April 2023
- Next perihelion: 13 September 2027
- Earth MOID: 0.0245 AU (3.67 million km)

Physical characteristics
- Dimensions: 1.4±0.1 km
- Geometric albedo: 0.033

300P/Catalina is a periodic, near-Earth comet in the Solar System with an orbital period of 4.4 years. It is the second comet ever listed on the Sentry Risk Table. At 1.4 km (0.87 mi) in diameter, it is one of the largest objects ever listed on the Sentry Risk Table.

== Observational history ==
It was discovered on 6 May 2005 as 2005 JQ_{5}, and listed on the Sentry Risk Table with five virtual impactors starting in 2041. On 17 May 2005 it was designated as comet P/2005 JQ5 (Catalina). It was removed from the Sentry Risk Table on 7 June 2005. It was observed by Arecibo Observatory on 12 June 2005.

300P/Catalina makes close approaches to Earth and has an Earth-MOID of 0.0245 AU (3,670,000 km; 2,280,000 mi). On 8 June 2036 the comet will pass 0.0536 AU (8,020,000 km; 4,980,000 mi) from Earth.

== Meteor shower ==
300P/Catalina is suspected of being the parent body of the minor June Epsilon Ophiuchids meteor shower. There was an outburst of meteor activity from 19 June 2019 until 26 June 2019 when 88 June epsilon Ophiuchids were detected by the Cameras for Allsky Meteor Surveillance (CAMS) network. The June epsilon Ophiuchids created 50% of the fireball detections in the period 22–24 June. This outburst offers evidence of past activity of 300P/Catalina. The radiant is near 16:21 (245.2) -7.4 in the constellation of Ophiuchus. The June epsilon Ophiuchids radiate from a very large scattered radiant area and may be related to a number of other minor showers that have been identified. The meteors have a velocity of around 14 km/s.

== Proposed exploration ==
In 2019, 300P/Catalina was listed as one of 10 backup targets of the European Space Agency's Comet Interceptor mission. Scheduled for launch on 2029, the spacecraft may conduct a flyby of 300P on 19 June 2036 if selected.

Numbered comets
Previous; 299P/Catalina–PANSTARRS	300P/Catalina	Next; 301P/LINEAR–NEAT
