= 11P/Tempel–Swift–LINEAR =

Jupiter-family comet

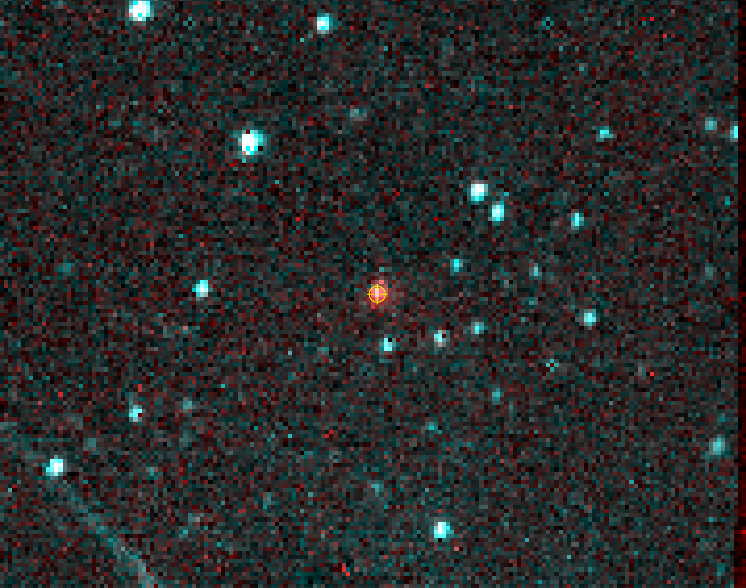
- Infrared image of Comet T–S–L taken by NEOWISE on 4 January 2021.

Discovery
- Discovered by: Ernst Tempel; Lewis Swift; LINEAR
- Discovery date: 27 November 1869; 11 October 1880; 7 December 2001

Designations
- MPC designation: P/1869 W1, P/1880 T1; P/2001 X3
- Alternative designations: 1869 III, 1880 IV; 1891 V, 1908 II; 1869c, 1880e, 1891d; 1908d

Orbital characteristics
- Epoch: 21 November 2025 (JD 2461000.5)
- Observation arc: 156.74 years (Note: Observation arc from the Minor Planet Center database only covered dates from 25 December 1880 until 24 August 2026 (145.66 years). This figure included its entire arc up to 27 November 1869.)
- Number of observations: 1,365
- Aphelion: 5.18 AU
- Perihelion: 1.387 AU
- Semi-major axis: 3.283 AU
- Eccentricity: 0.57739
- Orbital period: 5.95 years
- Inclination: 14.432°
- Longitude of ascending node: 238.86°
- Argument of periapsis: 168.06°
- Mean anomaly: 301.36°
- Last perihelion: 26 November 2020
- Next perihelion: 9 November 2026
- T_{Jupiter}: 2.839
- Earth MOID: 0.403 AU
- Jupiter MOID: 0.326 AU

Physical characteristics
- Mean radius: 0.6 km (0.37 mi)
- Mean density: 490±70 kg/m^{3}
- Comet total magnitude (M1): 15.2±0.7
- Comet nuclear magnitude (M2): 18.6

11P/Tempel–Swift–LINEAR is a periodic comet roughly 1 km in diameter with a 5.95-year orbit around the Sun. At the perihelion passage on 9 November 2026 the solar elongation will be 170 degrees with a declination of +26. The closest approach to Earth will be two days later on 11 November 2026 at a distance of 0.401 AU (60.0 million km). (Note: The 2026 Earth approach of 0.401 AU (60.0 million km) is closer than the (Epoch 2019) Earth–Minimum orbit intersection distance (MOID) of 0.403 AU (60.3 million km).) The comet may brighten enough in late 2026 to get into the reach of smart telescopes.

== Observational history ==
=== Discovery ===
In 1869, the comet's perihelion was around 1.063 AU (159.0 million km) from the Sun. Ernst Wilhelm Leberecht Tempel originally discovered the comet on 27 November 1869, from his observatory at Marseille. It was later observed by Lewis Swift from the Warner Observatory on 11 October 1880, and he realised that it is the same comet as Tempel's.

=== Loss and recovery ===
After 1908, the comet became an unobservable lost comet due to a series of four close flybys of Jupiter between 1911 and 1946 (Note: 11P/Tempel–Swift–LINEAR approached Jupiter at a distance of 0.61 AU (May 1911), 0.50 AU (July 1923), 0.56 AU (April 1935), and 1.33 AU (November 1946) respectively.) perturbing its orbit significantly enough that made subsequent apparitions of the comet unfavorable for observations in decades. Nevertheless, Brian G. Marsden computed the resulting orbit based on the observations between 1891 and 1908, and predicted a favorable return in 1963, however the comet remained unobserved. Despite this, additional predictions of the comet's favorable returns were later attempted by Marsden and Zdenek Sekanina in 1971, and Shuichi Nakano in 1995.

On 7 December 2001, an object designated as P/2001 X3 was found by the Lincoln Near-Earth Asteroid Research (LINEAR) program. Analysis of images taken between 10 September and 17 October 2001 later confirmed that P/2001 X3 was the recovery of the previously lost comet Tempel–Swift.

=== Recent observations ===
The comet was not observed during the 2008 unfavorable apparition because the perihelion passage occurred when the comet was on the far side of the Sun. The comet was observed during the 2014 and 2020 apparitions. For the 2026 perihelion passage, the comet was recovered on 6 August 2026. The comet will next come to perihelion on 9 November 2026, then two days later on the 11th, make a closest approach to Earth of 0.4012 AU (60.02 million km).

11P/Tempel–Swift–LINEAR closest Earth approach on 2026-Nov-11
Date & time of closest approach	Earth distance (AU)	Sun distance (AU)	Velocity wrt Earth (km/s)	Velocity wrt Sun (km/s)	Uncertainty region (3-sigma)	Reference
2026-Nov-11 19:16	0.401 AU (60.0 million km; 37.3 million mi)	1.39 AU (208 million km; 129 million mi)	7.9	31.8	± 192 km	Horizons

=== 2104 ===
11P/Tempel-Swift-LINEAR closest Earth approach on 2104-Nov-14
Date & time of closest approach	Earth distance (AU)	Sun distance (AU)	Velocity wrt Earth (km/s)	Velocity wrt Sun (km/s)	Uncertainty region (3-sigma)	Reference
2104-Nov-14 19:38	0.309 AU (46.2 million km; 28.7 million mi)	1.28 AU (191 million km; 119 million mi)	9.4	33.2	± 100000 km	Horizons

== Notes ==
Numbered comets
Previous; 10P/Tempel	11P/Tempel–Swift–LINEAR	Next; 12P/Pons–Brooks
