= Clementine 2 =

Proposed asteroid mission

Clementine 2 (DSPSE-2)
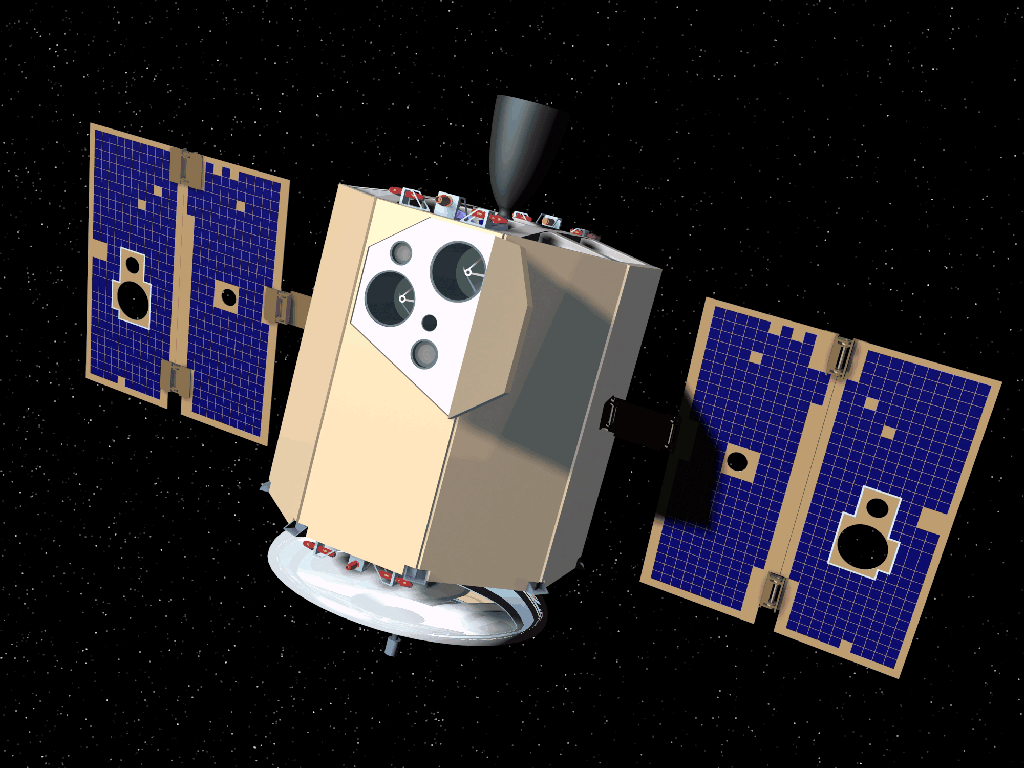
- Design of the original Clementine spacecraft
- Mission type: Asteroid exploration
- Operator: NASA / BMDO
- Mission duration: Cancelled

Spacecraft properties
- Manufacturer: Naval Research Laboratory

Start of mission
- Launch date: Planned: July 1995
- Rocket: Taurus-1110

Flyby of 433 Eros (proposed)
- Closest approach: 13 March 1996
- Distance: 30 km (19 mi)

Flyby of 4179 Toutatis (proposed)
- Closest approach: 4 October 1996
- Distance: 50 km (31 mi)

Clementine 2 was a proposed asteroid-interception mission that was intended to fly by two near-Earth asteroids, 433 Eros and 4179 Toutatis planned by NASA.

== History ==
The probe impact at Toutatis was needed to obtain the dynamic strength of surface material and data on the properties of the regolith and on stratification below the surface, and potentially allowed the measurement of thermal diffusivity between the interior and the surface. Measurements should be done by high-resolution imagery of the impact crater and its surroundings in visible, ultraviolet, and infrared wave bands from the spacecraft flying by some 30 min after the probe strike. It was proposed to equip the probe with a lightweight mass spectrometer and dust analyzer to measure the particle sizes and distribution and the composition of the ejected cloud. The mission was planned to be launched in July 1995, with the Eros encounter on 13 March 1996, and the Toutatis flyby on 4 October 1996, some 440 days after launch.

The mission was to be a successor of Clementine, and to be launched by a Taurus 1110 rocket, but was cancelled in 1997.

== See also ==
- Double Asteroid Redirection Test
