= 10P/Tempel =

Jupiter-family comet

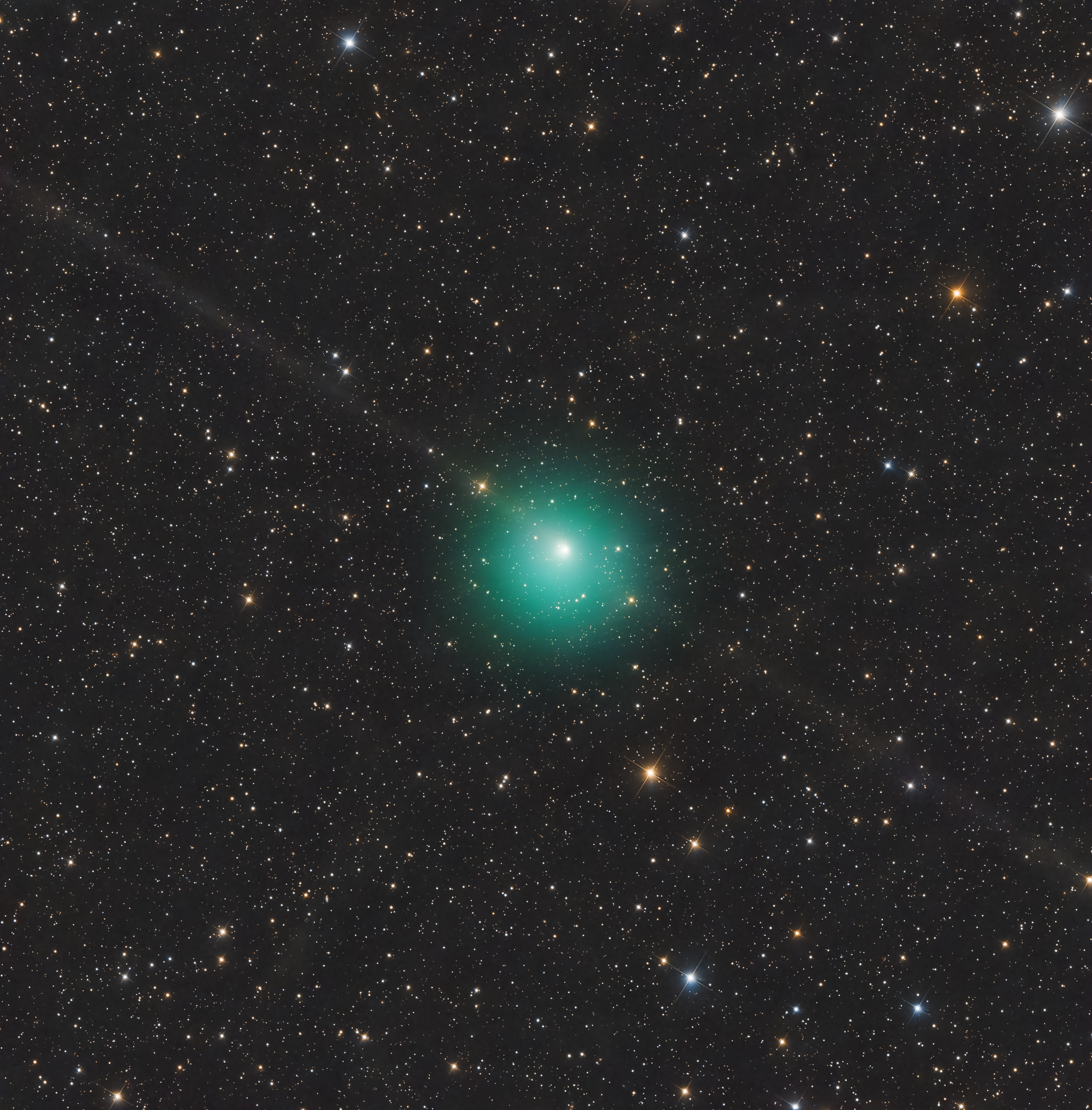
- Comet Tempel 2 and the trail of dust that accumulates in its orbit. Photo captured on 11 July 2026.

Discovery
- Discovered by: Wilhelm Tempel
- Discovery date: 4 July 1873

Designations
- MPC designation: P/1873 N1, P/1878 O1
- Pronunciation: /ˈtɛmpəl/
- Alternative designations: Tempel 2; 1873 II, 1878 III, 1894 III; 1899 IV, 1904 III, 1915 I; 1920 II, 1925 IV, 1930 VII; 1946 III, 1951 VIII, 1957 II; 1962 VI, 1967 X, 1972 X; 1978 V, 1983 X, 1988 XIV; 1994 VII

Orbital characteristics
- Epoch: 9 June 2026 (JD 2461200.5)
- Observation arc: 153.14 years (Note: Observation arc from the Minor Planet Center database only covered dates from 5 August 1894 until 21 August 2026 (132.05 years). This figure included its entire arc up to 4 July 1873.)
- Number of observations: 7,784
- Aphelion: 4.71 AU
- Perihelion: 1.418 AU
- Semi-major axis: 3.06 AU
- Eccentricity: 0.5374
- Orbital period: 5.37 years
- Inclination: 12.027°
- Longitude of ascending node: 117.80°
- Argument of periapsis: 195.47°
- Mean anomaly: 350.06°
- Last perihelion: 2 August 2026
- Next perihelion: 11 December 2031
- T_{Jupiter}: 2.965
- Earth MOID: 0.407 AU (60.9 million km)
- Jupiter MOID: 0.620 AU (92.8 million km)

Physical characteristics
- Mean diameter: 10.6 km (6.6 mi)
- Mean density: 0.54 g/cm^{3}
- Synodic rotation period: 8.948±0.001 hours
- Geometric albedo: 0.022
- Spectral type: (V–R) = 0.561±0.04; (B–V) = 0.80±0.02; (R–I) = 0.52±0.03
- Comet total magnitude (M1): 14.6
- Apparent magnitude: 9 (2026-07-11)

10P/Tempel, also known as Tempel 2, is a large Jupiter-family comet roughly 10 km in diameter with a 5.4 year orbit around the Sun. It was discovered on 4 July 1873 by Wilhelm Tempel.

As of late August 2026, the comet is around apparent magnitude 9 with a declination of –33. The orbital dust trail created from particles ejected by the nucleus over hundreds of years is visible in images of the comet. At perihelion passage on 2 August 2026 the solar elongation was 164 degrees at a magnitude of approximately 8–9 with a declination of –24°. (Note: For comparison, the star Antares has a southern declination of −26°.) The closest approach to Earth was the next day on 3 August 2026 at a distance of 0.414 AU (61.9 million km). (Note: The 2026 Earth approach of 0.414 AU (61.9 million km) was close to the Earth–Minimum orbit intersection distance (MOID) of 0.407 AU (60.9 million km).) (Note: The 5-km in diameter short period comet 169P/NEAT passed 0.167 AU (25.0 million km) from Earth on 11 August 2026. The 1-km in diameter short period comet 11P/Tempel–Swift–LINEAR will pass 0.401 AU (60.0 million km) from Earth on 11 November 2026.) The comet got into the reach of most binoculars.

10P/Tempel closest Earth approach on 2026-Aug-03
Date & time of closest approach	Earth distance (AU)	Sun distance (AU)	Velocity wrt Earth (km/s)	Velocity wrt Sun (km/s)	Uncertainty region (3-sigma)	Reference
2026-Aug-03 20:56	0.414 AU (61.9 million km; 38.5 million mi)	1.42 AU (212 million km; 132 million mi)	6.5	31.0	± 34 km	Horizons

== Physical characteristics ==
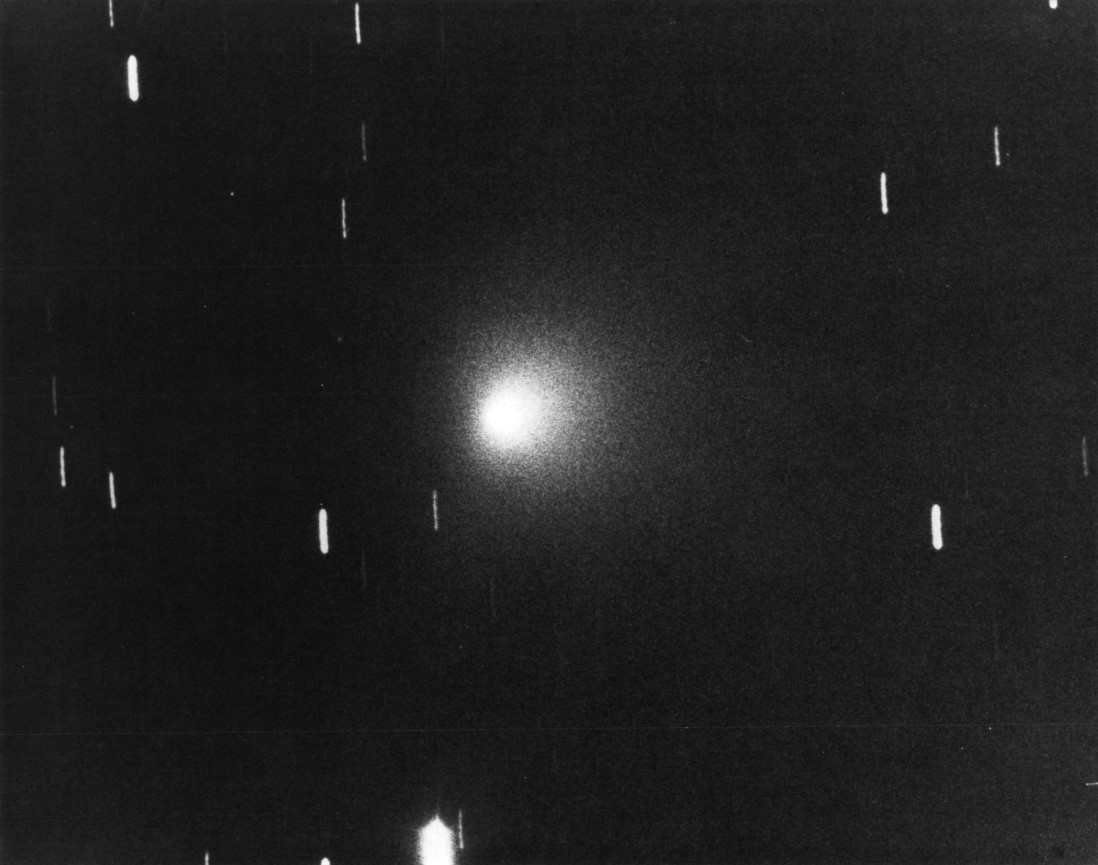
Comet Tempel 2 photographed by H. M. Jeffers from the Lick Observatory in 1946

The comet nucleus is estimated to be roughly the size of Halley's Comet at 10.6 km (6.6 mi) in diameter with a low albedo of 0.022. The nucleus is dark because hydrocarbons on the surface have been converted to a dark, tar like substance by solar ultraviolet radiation. The nucleus is large enough that even near aphelion (furthest distance from the Sun which is near the orbit of Jupiter) the comet remains brighter than about magnitude 21.

Photometry during four apparitions between 1983 and 2011 shows that cometary activity increases sharply about three months before perihelion and after perihelion declines steadily and slowly. During the 2010 apparition the comet brightened to about apparent magnitude 8. The most favorable apparition of 10P/Tempel 2 was in 1925 when it came within 0.35 AU (52 million km; 33 million mi) of Earth with an apparent magnitude of 6.5.

Infrared spectroscopy conducted in July 2010 revealed the presence of CH_{3}OH, C_{2}H_{6}, NH_{3} and HCN in trace amounts within its coma, with their peak intensities suggesting a possible existence of a distributed source that was released from the nucleus as sublimed icy grains.

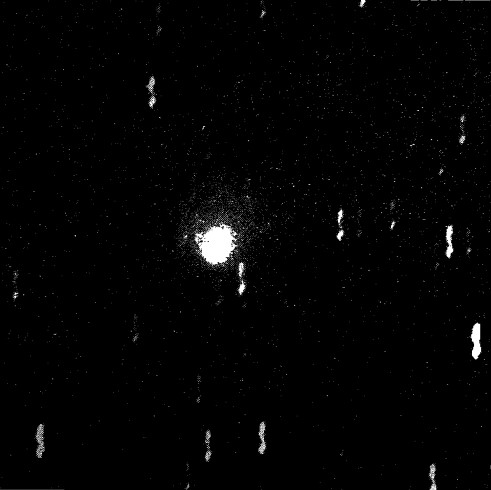
Comet Tempel 2 imaged by George van Biesbroeck from the Yerkes Observatory on 23 July 1925.

Observations by the Infrared Astronomical Satellite in 1983 showed that the comet has a dust trail. At that time it was the most prominent of the observed dust trails and extended for over 48 degrees in the sky while it was narrow, less than 4 arcminutes thick. The particles that comprise it have a diameter over one millemeter and were ejected from the comet over a period of hundreds of years with velocities of several meters per second with respect to the comet. The particles in front of the comet have a diamater of at least 6 mm.

Photometry of the comet in 2010–2011 indicated that the nucleus was rotating once every 8.950±0.002 hours. That rotational period was higher than that calculated in 1999, when it was 8.941±0.002 hours, which in turn was higher than that in 1988, indicating that the nuclear rotation rate was slowing due to asymmetric outgassing. The comet features an almost linear jet in CN and red images by the Lowell Observatory whose appearance changes only slightly during the rotation of the comet, originating from a small region near the pole of the comet.

== Proposed exploration ==
The Jet Propulsion Laboratory proposed a flyby of the comet with a flight spare of Mariner 4. The probe was instead used for a Venus flyby as Mariner 5.

It was the original target of the Comet Rendezvous Asteroid Flyby (CRAF) mission before it was switched to 22P/Kopff due to developmental delays, until its eventual cancellation in 1992.

10P/Tempel was to be the target of the NASA part of the International Comet Mission after transporting a European probe to a flyby of Halley's Comet. The plan was to use Solar electric propulsion to get the craft to orbit the comet. The program was cancelled in November 1979.

== Notes ==
Numbered comets
Previous; 9P/Tempel	10P/Tempel	Next; 11P/Tempel–Swift–LINEAR
