= Mariner 5 =

NASA flyby mission to Venus (1967–1968)

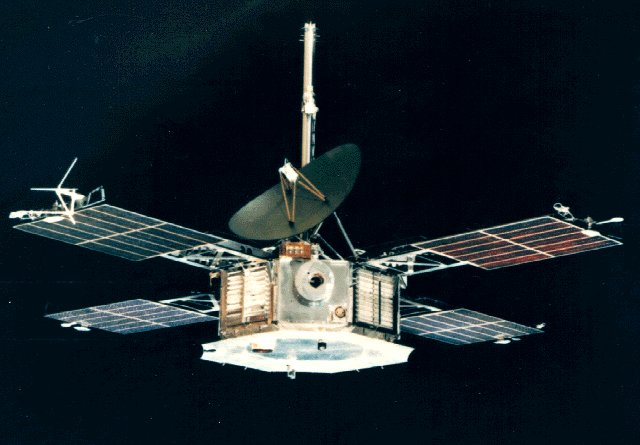
- Mission type: Venus flyby
- Operator: NASA / JPL
- COSPAR ID: 1967-060A
- SATCAT no.: 2845
- Mission duration: 1 year, 4 months and 22 days

Spacecraft properties
- Manufacturer: Jet Propulsion Laboratory
- Launch mass: 244.9 kilograms (540 lb)
- Power: 170 W

Start of mission
- Launch date: June 14, 1967, 06:01:00 UTC
- Rocket: Atlas-SLV3 Agena-D
- Launch site: Cape Canaveral LC-12

End of mission
- Last contact: December 4, 1967; Loss of contact October 14, 1968; Briefly regained

Flyby of Venus
- Closest approach: October 19, 1967
- Distance: 3,990 kilometers (2,480 miles)

Instruments
- Ultraviolet Photometer; Two-Frequency Beacon Receiver; S-Band Occultation; Helium-Vector Magnetometer; Solar-Plasma Probe; Trapped Radiation Detector

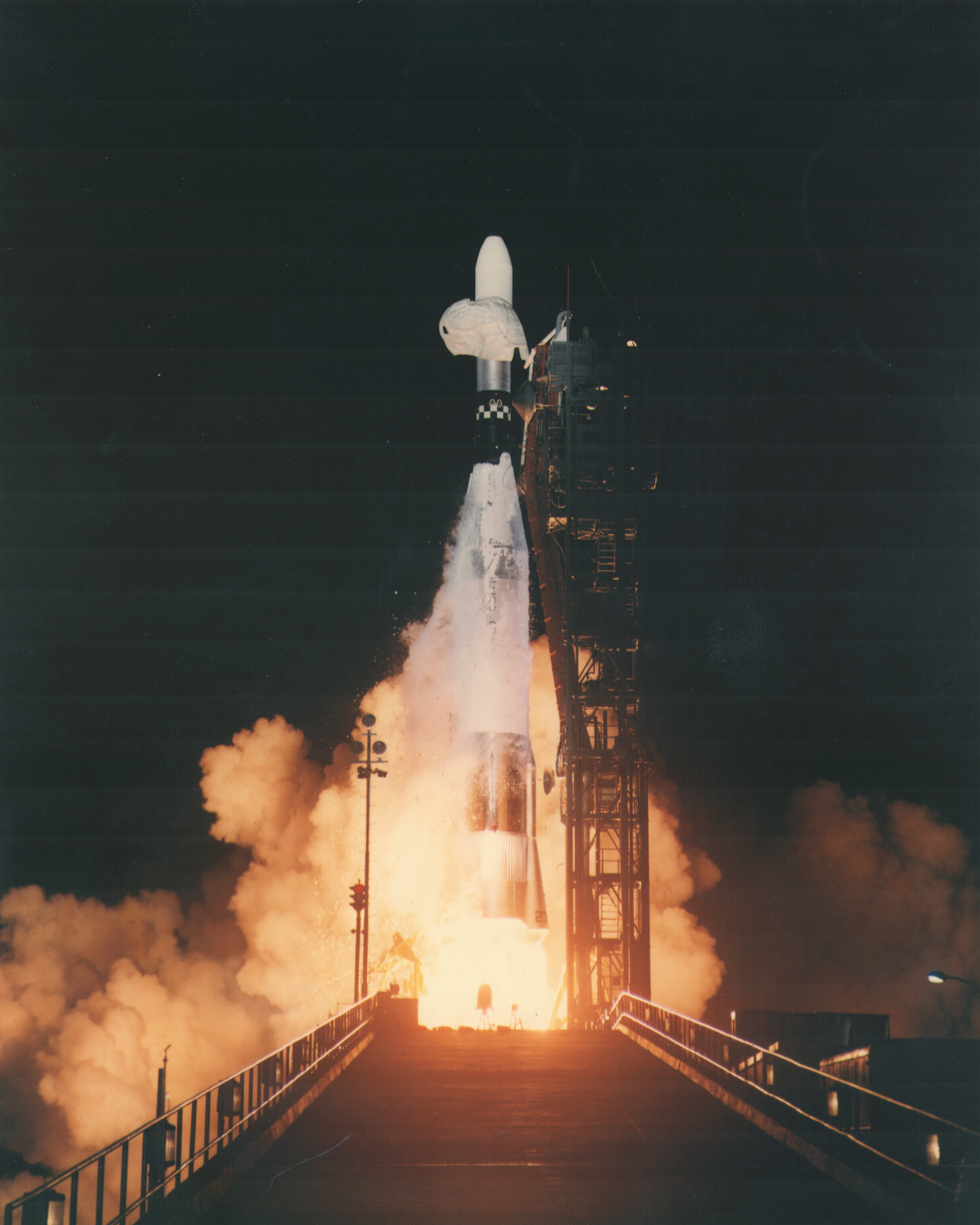
Launch of Mariner 5

Mariner 5 (Mariner V or Mariner Venus 1967) was a spacecraft of the Mariner program that carried a complement of experiments to probe Venus's atmosphere by radio occultation, measure the hydrogen Lyman-alpha (hard ultraviolet) spectrum, and sample the solar particles and magnetic field fluctuations above the planet. Its goals were to measure interplanetary and Venusian magnetic fields, charged particles, plasma, radio refractivity and UV emissions of the Venusian atmosphere.

== History ==
Mariner 5 was built as a backup to Mariner 4, but after the success of the Mariner 4 mission, it was modified to be used for a Venus flyby mission to take place during the 1967 Venus launch window. Mariner 5 omitted several experiments from Mariner 4, including the TV camera, the ionization chamber/geiger counter, the cosmic ray detector, and the cosmic dust detector. It retained the helium-vector magnetometer, solar plasma probe, and trapped radiation detector from Mariner 4. Unlike Mariner 4, Mariner 5 needed to face away from the Sun to keep its high-gain antenna pointed at Earth because of its trajectory. As a result, the solar panels were reversed so they could remain pointed at the Sun. Additionally, since its mission to Venus brought it in closer proximity to the Sun, fewer solar cells were needed to achieve the necessary power generation, and as a result the solar panels were reduced in size to save mass as well as to make room for two 50 MHz dual-frequency receiver (DFR) antennas that were mounted on the frame of two of the solar panels. Since the aft side of the spacecraft faced the Sun, the solar plasma probe was relocated to the aft-facing side of Mariner 5.

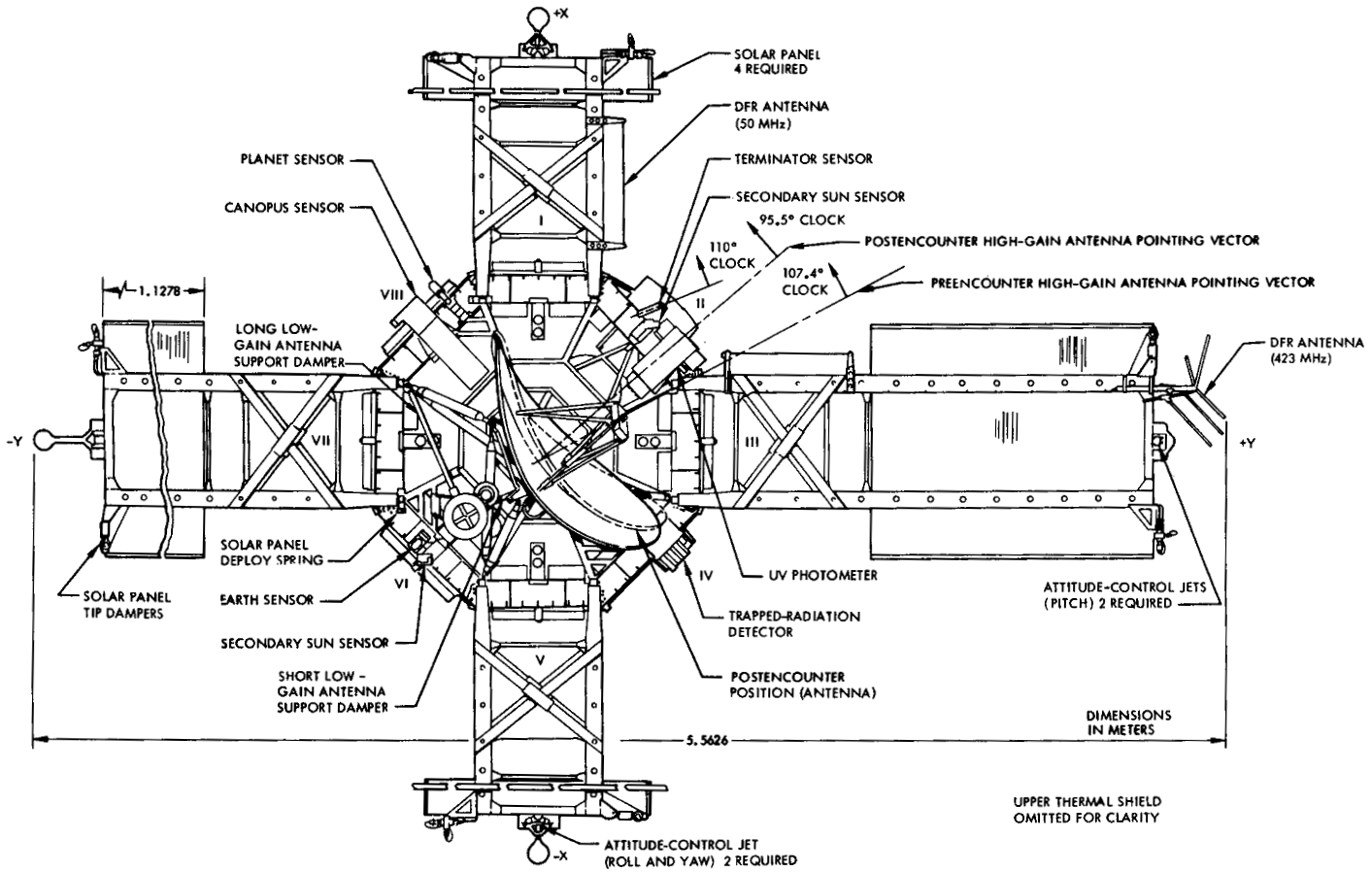
Mariner 5 diagram

The mounting for the high-gain antenna also needed modification. Unlike Mariner 4, where the geometry of the transfer orbit allowed for the high-gain antenna to be inclined at a relatively simple 38 degrees from the bottom plane, Mariner 5's trajectory required the high-gain antenna to be skewed at a more awkward angle. The high-gain antenna also included a single-use mechanism that allowed the high-gain antenna to make a shift in its angle as part of the radio occultation experiment. Mariner 5 also included some additional equipment that was not flown on Mariner 4, such as its Ultraviolet Photometer, two 50 MHz DFR antennas, a 423 MHz DFR antenna mounted on the end of one of the solar panels, and a deployable Sun-shade on the aft of the spacecraft for thermal control. The UV Photometer was originally supposed to fly on Mariner 4 and would have been mounted to its TV Camera scan platform. However, it was removed (allowing it to be flown on Mariner 5) and swapped out for a thermal/inertial mass simulator late in the assembly of Mariner 4 as it was discovered to create electrical arcing problems that would have jeopardized the TV Camera.

Prior to the choice of Venus as the target, proposals had been made to send it to either the comet 7P/Pons–Winnecke or 10P/Tempel.

== Launch ==
Liftoff took place on June 14, 1967, from Cape Canaveral Air Force Station Launch Complex 12 on Atlas vehicle 5401. Booster performance was normal through the Atlas portion of the launch and the first Agena burn, with all systems operating at the proper level. During the second Agena burn, abnormal fluctuations in the engine chamber pressure occurred, however they did not preclude successful interplanetary injection. There had been several occurrences of this behavior on previous NASA and Air Force launches and a program was initiated to correct it which led to a redesign of the Agena turbopump gearbox.

== Venus flyby ==
Mariner 5 flew by Venus on October 19, 1967, at an altitude of 3,990 kilometers (2,480 mi). With more sensitive instruments than its predecessor Mariner 2, Mariner 5 was able to shed new light on the hot, cloud-covered planet and on conditions in interplanetary space.

Radio occultation data from Mariner 5 helped to understand the temperature and pressure data returned by the Venera 4 lander, which arrived at Venus shortly before it. The Venera 4 and Mariner 5 data was subsequently analysed together under a combined Soviet–American working group of COSPAR in 1969, an organization of early space cooperation. With the data of these missions, it was clear that Venus had a very hot surface and an atmosphere even denser than expected.

The operations of Mariner 5 ended in November 1967 and it is now defunct in a heliocentric orbit.

== Further communication attempts ==
Further communication attempts were tried, in a joint spacecraft solar wind / solar magnetic fields investigation with Mariner 4, back in communication with Earth after being out of telemetry for about a year or more around superior conjunction. During the experiment, both spacecraft were going to be on the same idealized magnetic field spiral carried out from the sun by the solar wind.

Between April and November 1968 NASA tried to reacquire Mariner 5 to continue probing interplanetary conditions. Attempts to reacquire Mariner 5 during June, July, and early August 1968 yielded no spacecraft signal.

On October 14, the receiver operator at DSS 14 obtained a lock on the Mariner 5 signal. A carrier wave was detected, but outside expected frequency limits and varying in wavelength. Signal strength changes indicated the spacecraft was in a slow roll. Nevertheless, it was possible to lock the spacecraft to an uplink signal, but no response was observed to any commands sent to it. Without telemetry and without any signal change in response to commands, there was no possibility to repair or continue to use the spacecraft. Operations were terminated at the end of the track from DSS 61 at 07:46 GMT on November 5, 1968.

== Experiments ==
Mariner 5 returned data from seven experiments:

=== Celestial Mechanics ===
Tracking data from Mariner 5, combined with Deep Space Network equipment, were used to refine the masses of Venus and the Moon, improve the astronomical unit, and update Earth-Venus ephemerides. Doppler measurements worked effectively up to 48 million km. Principal investigator was John D. Anderson from the Jet Propulsion Laboratory.

=== Interplanetary Ion Plasma Probe for E/Q of 40 to 9400 Volts ===
This three-part Faraday cup measured positive ions from 40 to 9400 eV/Q in eight energy ranges. Always facing the Sun, it gathered directional data by comparing signals from its three 120° collectors. It cycled through voltage settings in two modes—total and individual plate currents—producing 64 measurements every 5 minutes. The instrument functioned normally throughout the mission. Principal investigator was Herbert S. Bridge from the Massachusetts Institute of Technology.

=== S-Band Occultation ===
This experiment aimed to study Venus's atmosphere and ionosphere by analyzing changes in the S-band signal, including phase shift, Doppler shift, and signal weakening. Principal investigator was Arvydas J. Kliore from the Jet Propulsion Laboratory.

=== Trapped Radiation Detector ===
This experiment aimed to measure energetic particles in interplanetary space and investigate potential radiation belts or particle effects near Venus. It used specialized detectors to capture electrons and protons at various energy levels and angles relative to the probe-Sun line. Principal investigator was James A. Van Allen from the University of Iowa.

=== Triaxial Low Field Helium Magnetometer ===
This experiment used a helium magnetometer mounted on a 1.5-meter boom to measure interplanetary and Venusian magnetic fields in three directions. It operated in both high and low bit-rate modes, collecting precise data with a dynamic range of ±204 nT and accuracy up to ±0.2 nT. High-quality data were gathered from June to October 1967, except for a brief period in late September. Principal investigator was Edward J. Smith from the Jet Propulsion Laboratory.

=== Two-Frequency Beacon Receiver ===
A steerable antenna at Stanford transmitted two radio signals (423.3 MHz and 49.8 MHz) to the spacecraft’s two-frequency receiver. The high-frequency signal acted as a reference, while delays in the low-frequency signal revealed total electron content along the path. Phase and group velocity differences were measured onboard and sent back to Earth, helping to determine interplanetary electron content and solar wind variations. The experiment ran successfully from launch through November 1967. Principal investigator was Von R. Eshleman from Stanford University.

=== Ultraviolet Photometer ===
This experiment used a UV photometer to study Venus's upper atmosphere by measuring ultraviolet emissions caused by solar radiation scattering off atmospheric atoms. By analyzing these emissions, especially hydrogen Lyman-alpha and atomic oxygen lines, scientists could determine the composition and temperature at various altitudes. The instrument had three photomultiplier tubes with specific filters to isolate key wavelengths. Principal investigator was Charles A. Barth from the University of Colorado.

== See also ==
- List of missions to Venus
