= Next Generation Small-Body Sample Return =

Proposed Japanese sample-return mission

Next Generation Small-Body Sample Return (NGSR)
- Mission type: Sample return
- Operator: JAXA
- Mission duration: 12 years (planned)

Spacecraft properties
- Bus: DSOTV
- Launch mass: ~2,000 kg (4,400 lb)
- Landing mass: ~130 kg (290 lb)
- Dry mass: DSOTV: <1,000 kg (2,200 lb); Lander: <120 kg (260 lb)
- Payload mass: 265 kg (584 lb)
- Dimensions: DSOTV: 1.8 × 2.4 × 2.6 m (5.9 × 7.9 × 8.5 ft); Lander: 0.8 × 0.8 × 0.8 m (2.6 × 2.6 × 2.6 ft)
- Power: DSOTV: 800 W; Lander: 220 W

Start of mission
- Launch date: January 2034 (planned)
- Rocket: H3-22S
- Launch site: Tanegashima Space Center

End of mission
- Disposal: Recovered
- Landing date: December 2046 (planned)

Flyby of Earth
- Closest approach: November 2035

Rendezvous with 289P/Blanpain
- Arrival date: January 2040
- Departure date: February 2042

Transponders
- Bandwidth: X band: 64 kbit/s

Next Generation Small-Body Sample Return (NGSR) is a proposed space mission concept by the Japan Aerospace Exploration Agency (JAXA) aimed at returning samples from a small Solar System body such as an asteroid or comet. Its main target is the comet 289P/Blanpain, a short-period comet with an orbital period of 5.2 years.

The mission is intended to build upon Japan's previous sample-return missions, including Hayabusa and Hayabusa2, which successfully returned material from near-Earth asteroids.

== Objectives ==
The primary goal of NGSR is to collect and return pristine material from a small celestial body to Earth for detailed scientific analysis. Such samples could provide insights into the early Solar System, the formation of planets, and the origins of organic compounds.

Additional objectives may include in situ analysis, surface mapping, and testing new technologies for deep-space exploration.

== Background ==
Japan has been a leader in asteroid sample-return missions. The Hayabusa mission returned samples from asteroid 25143 Itokawa in 2010, while Hayabusa2 delivered material from 162173 Ryugu in 2020.

NGSR is expected to incorporate advanced technologies developed from these missions, potentially enabling more complex sampling operations and access to different types of targets.

== Backup targets ==
Five additional launch windows were identified for the mission towards 289P between 2033 and 2039. Aside from 289P/Blanpain, several asteroids and comets were considered as backup targets in case the 2034 launch window were missed. These objects include comets 15P/Finlay and 252P/LINEAR, as well as the following asteroids; 2003 XM, (451124) 2009 KC_{3}, and 2016 LX48.

== See also ==
- Sample-return mission
  - Hayabusa
  - Hayabusa2
  - OSIRIS-REx
