= 289P/Blanpain =

Jupiter-family comet

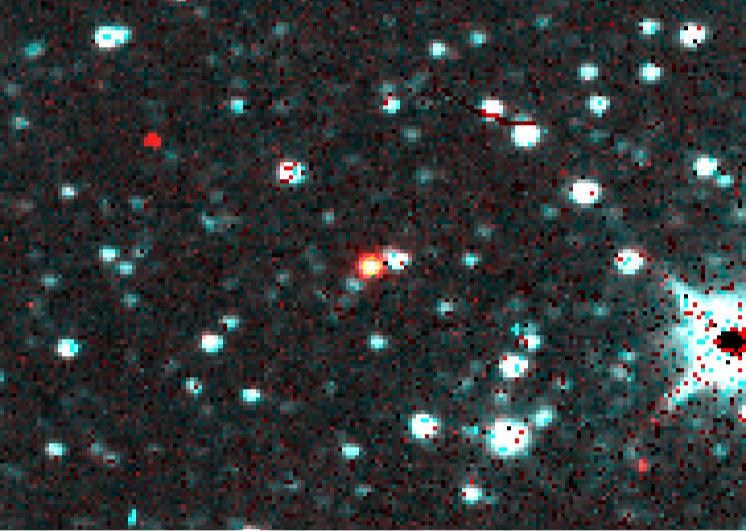
- Infrared image of 289P/Blanpain taken by NEOWISE on 11 January 2020

Discovery
- Discovered by: Jean-Jacques Blanpain
- Discovery site: Marseille, France
- Discovery date: 28 November 1819; 22 November 2003

Designations
- MPC designation: D/1819 W1, P/2003 WY_{25}
- Alternative designations: 1819 IV

Orbital characteristics
- Epoch: 21 November 2025 (JD 2461000.5)
- Observation arc: 204.63 years (Note: Observation arc from the Minor Planet Center database only covered dates from 14 December 1819 until 15 July 2024 (204.59 years). This figure included its entire arc up to 28 November 1819.)
- Number of observations: 690
- Aphelion: 5.133 AU
- Perihelion: 0.954 AU
- Semi-major axis: 3.044 AU
- Eccentricity: 0.68642
- Orbital period: 5.309 years
- Inclination: 5.900°
- Longitude of ascending node: 68.891°
- Argument of periapsis: 9.878°
- Mean anomaly: 40.964°
- Last perihelion: 14 April 2025
- Next perihelion: 6 August 2030
- T_{Jupiter}: 2.817
- Earth MOID: 0.017 AU
- Jupiter MOID: 0.217 AU

Physical characteristics
- Mean radius: 160 m (520 ft)
- Synodic rotation period: 8.85±0.39 hours
- Geometric albedo: 0.04 (assumed)
- Comet total magnitude (M1): 22.0

289P/Blanpain, formerly D/1819 W1 (Blanpain) is a Jupiter-family comet with an orbital period of 5.2 years. It was discovered by Jean-Jacques Blanpain on 28 November 1819, but was considered lost until it was recovered in 2013. It was last observed in 2024.

== Observational history ==
The comet was discovered by Jean-Jacques Blanpain on 28 November 1819. Blanpain described the comet as having a "very small and confused nucleus". Another independent discovery was made on December 5 of that year by Jean-Louis Pons. Following this the comet was lost, and was given the designation 'D' (Disappeared or Dead).

However, in 2003, the orbital elements of newly discovered asteroid 2003 WY_{25} were calculated by Marco Micheli and others to be a probable match for the lost comet. On 12 December 2003, it approached Earth at a distance of 0.025 AU (3.7 million km; 2.3 million mi). Further observations of the asteroid in 2005 by David C. Jewitt using the University of Hawaii 2.2 m telescope on Mauna Kea, appeared to reveal a faint coma, which supports the theory that 2003 WY_{25} is the lost comet, or a part of it. The comet was officially established as periodic comet 289P in July 2013, after being rediscovered by the Pan-STARRS survey during an outburst event.

The comet underwent a major outburst in July 2013, when it brightened by 9 magnitudes, one of the largest observed comet outbursts. The comet was first spotted in images obtained by Pan-STARRS on 4 July 2013, having a reported magnitude of about 20, and brightened to a magnitude of about 17.5 and featured a coma about 30 arcseconds across and a broad tail. It is estimated that the comet lost about 10^{8} kg of dust, which corresponds to about 1% of the comet's mass. The comet then was located 3.9 AU (580 million km; 360 million mi) from the Sun.

289P was better viewed near and after the December 2019 perihelion passage. On 11 January 2020, the comet approached Earth at a distance of 0.091 AU (13.6 million km; 8.5 million mi). The next close approach will take place on 6 November 2035, at a distance of 0.082 AU (12.3 million km; 7.6 million mi).

== Physical characteristics ==
The observations of the comet by the University of Hawaii 2.2 m telescope indicate the nucleus of the comet is quite small. Assuming an albedo of 0.04, which is the mean value for short period comets, its radius is about 160 m (520 ft), although the presence of coma and unknown phase function means that there is quite some uncertainty. However at that time it was the smallest known cometary nucleus. Observations of the comet in 2019–20 by NEOWISE indicate a rotational period of 8.8536±0.386 hours or 15.6 hours, with the former being more likely.

The ejected dust masses are 4100±200 kg inbound and 1700±200 kg outbound, respectively, based on the observations by NEOWISE. The dust production rates are 0.01–0.02 kg/sec^{−1}, corresponding to a dust-to-gas production ratio of 2 ≤ fdg ≤ 6. The resulting fractional active area, fA = 3.8±1.9 × 10^{−5}, is the smallest yet reported. The absence of 4.6 μm (W2) excess suggests that 289P/Blanpain contains negligible amounts of CO_{2} and CO. The perihelion-normalized nongravitational acceleration, a'NG = 3.1 × 10^{−6}, is approximately an order of magnitude smaller than the trend observed for well-studied comets, consistent with weak outgassing.

== Exploration proposals ==
289P/Blanpain has been proposed to be the primary target of the Japanese Next Generation Small-Body Return (NGSR) mission, designed to be launched in the 2030s. The goal of the mission is to return a sample from a comet to Earth, the first time after the Stardust mission. The comet was chosen due to its favorable orbital characteristics and small size. The comet has also been picked as a back-up target for ESA's Comet Interceptor mission, where it is planned to conduct a flyby of the comet by 23 November 2035 if selected.

== Source of the Phoenicids ==
Comet 289P/Blanpain currently has an Earth-MOID of 0.015 AU (2.2 million km; 1.4 million mi). The comet has been proposed as the probable source of the Phoenicid meteor stream, since the first observation of a Phoenicids meteor storm in 1956. Analysis of the orbits of asteroid 2003 WY_{25} have supported this conjecture, and it is thought likely that the comet was already breaking up at the time of its 1819 return. The 1956 meteor storm was created by trails formed from the late 18th through the early 19th centuries. Elevated Phoenicids activity was also observed on 2 December 2014, when Earth intersected with dust trails created in the early 20th century, indicating that the comet was then active enough to create meteors but not as active as in the early 19th century.

A separate 2025 study expressed doubt in having 289P/Blanpain as the sole true parent body of the Phoenicids, as the comet's nucleus is too small to explain the total mass of the entire meteoroid stream, however debris from two other comets (46P/Wirtanen and 104P/Kowal) may have additionally contributed to it.

== Notes ==
Numbered comets
Previous; 288P/2006 VW139	289P/Blanpain	Next; 290P/Jäger
