= Comet Interceptor =

European–Japanese spacecraft to launch in 2029

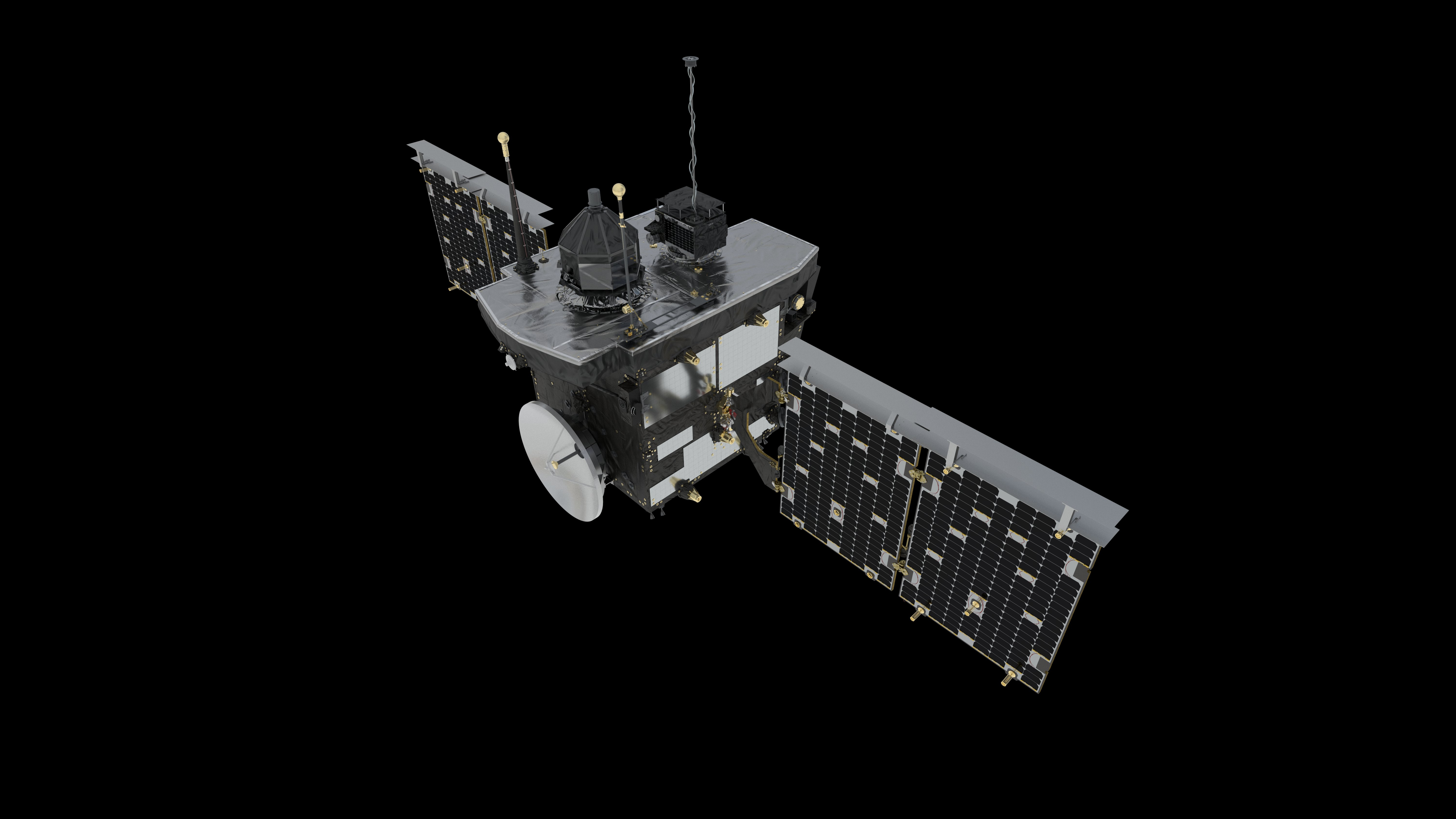
- 3D render of the Comet Interceptor spacecraft
- Mission type: Comet flyby
- Operator: ESA / JAXA
- Website: www.esa.int/Science_Exploration/Space_Science/Comet_Interceptor
- Mission duration: ≈ 6 years

Spacecraft properties
- Spacecraft: Comet Interceptor
- Launch mass: ~850 kg (1,870 lb).

Start of mission
- Launch date: 2028–2029 (planned)
- Rocket: Ariane 62
- Launch site: Kourou ELA-4
- Contractor: Arianespace

Flyby of a long-period comet yet to be selected
- ESA insignia Cosmic Vision (Science Programme)

Comet Interceptor is a robotic spacecraft mission led by the European Space Agency (ESA) planned for launch sometime between August 2028 and July 2029. The spacecraft will be placed at the Sun-Earth L_{2} point and wait for up to three years for a long-period comet to fly by at a reachable trajectory and speed. The mission's primary science goal is "to characterise a dynamically-new comet including its surface composition, shape, structure, and the composition of its gas coma."

== Background ==
Comet Interceptor is being developed as ESA's first Fast class (F-class) of the Cosmic Vision programme. The mission is being planned and developed by a consortium that includes the ESA and Japan's space agency JAXA. Comet Interceptor will share the launch vehicle with ESA's ARIEL space telescope, which is also bound for Lagrange point 2. The Principal Investigator is Geraint Jones, from the Mullard Space Science Laboratory in the United Kingdom. The maximum cost of the spacecraft bus is set at €150M, excluding science instruments and launch services.

== Overview ==
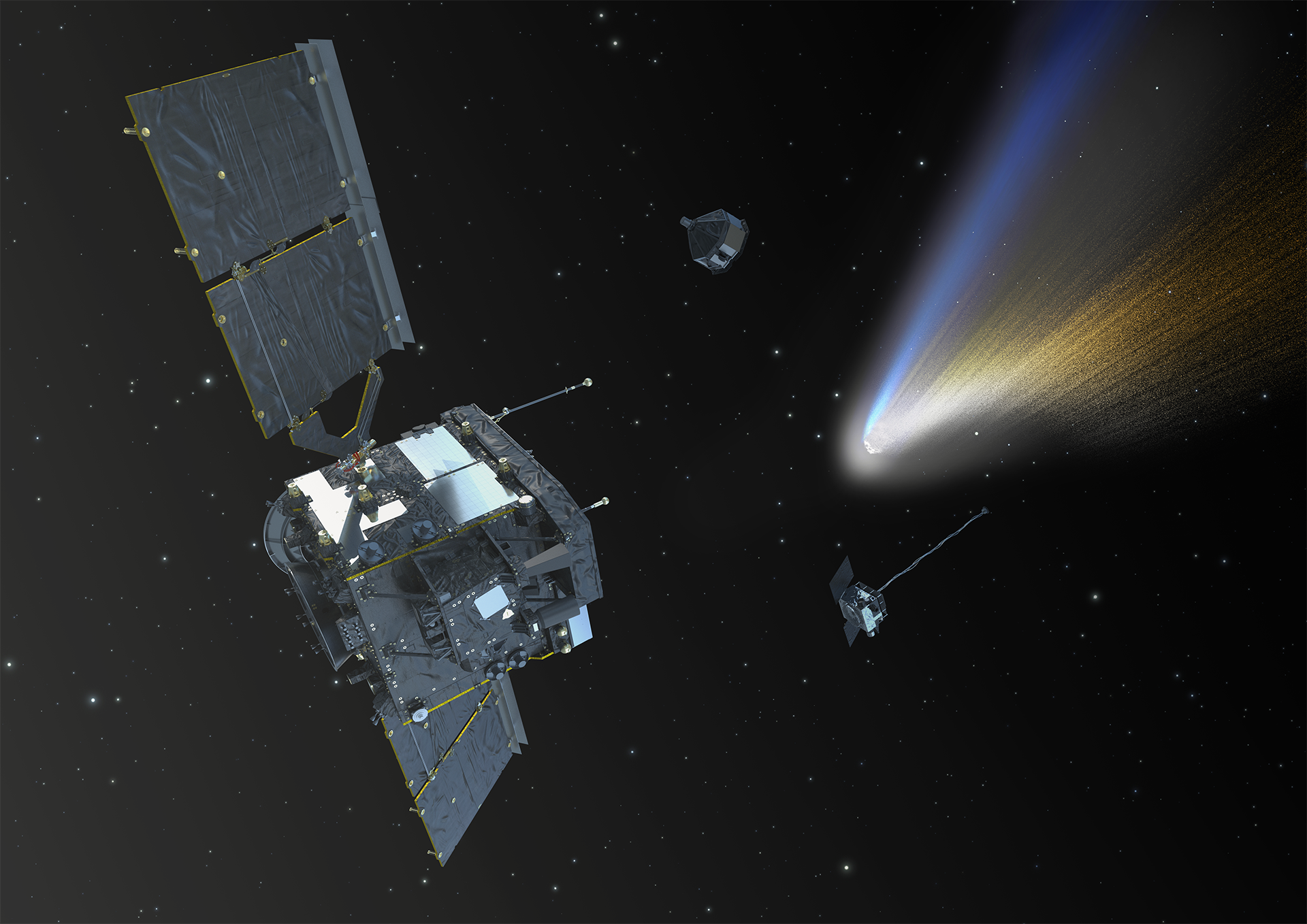
Artist's impression of the Comet Interceptor in space

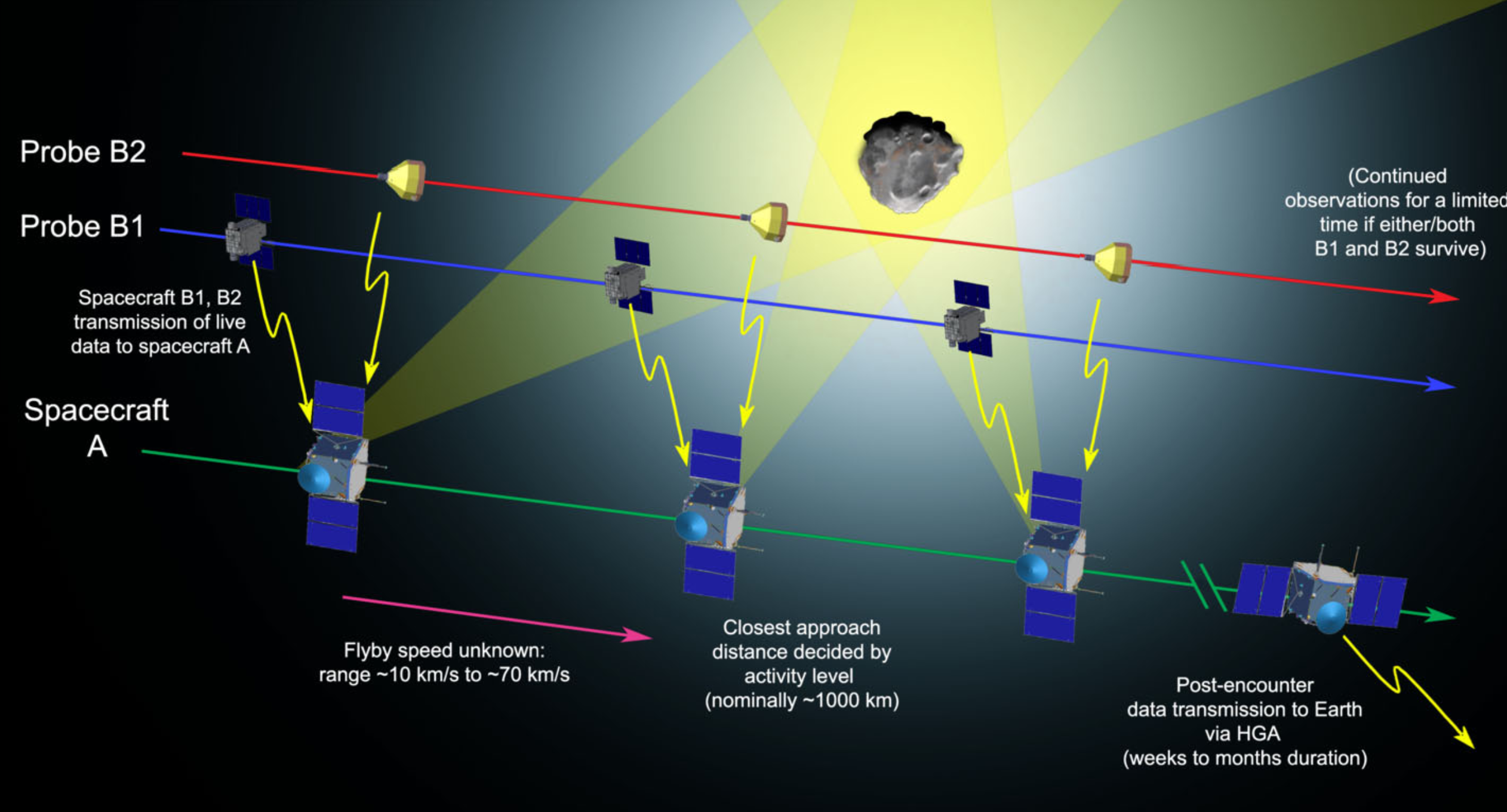
Sketch of the Comet Interceptor flyby

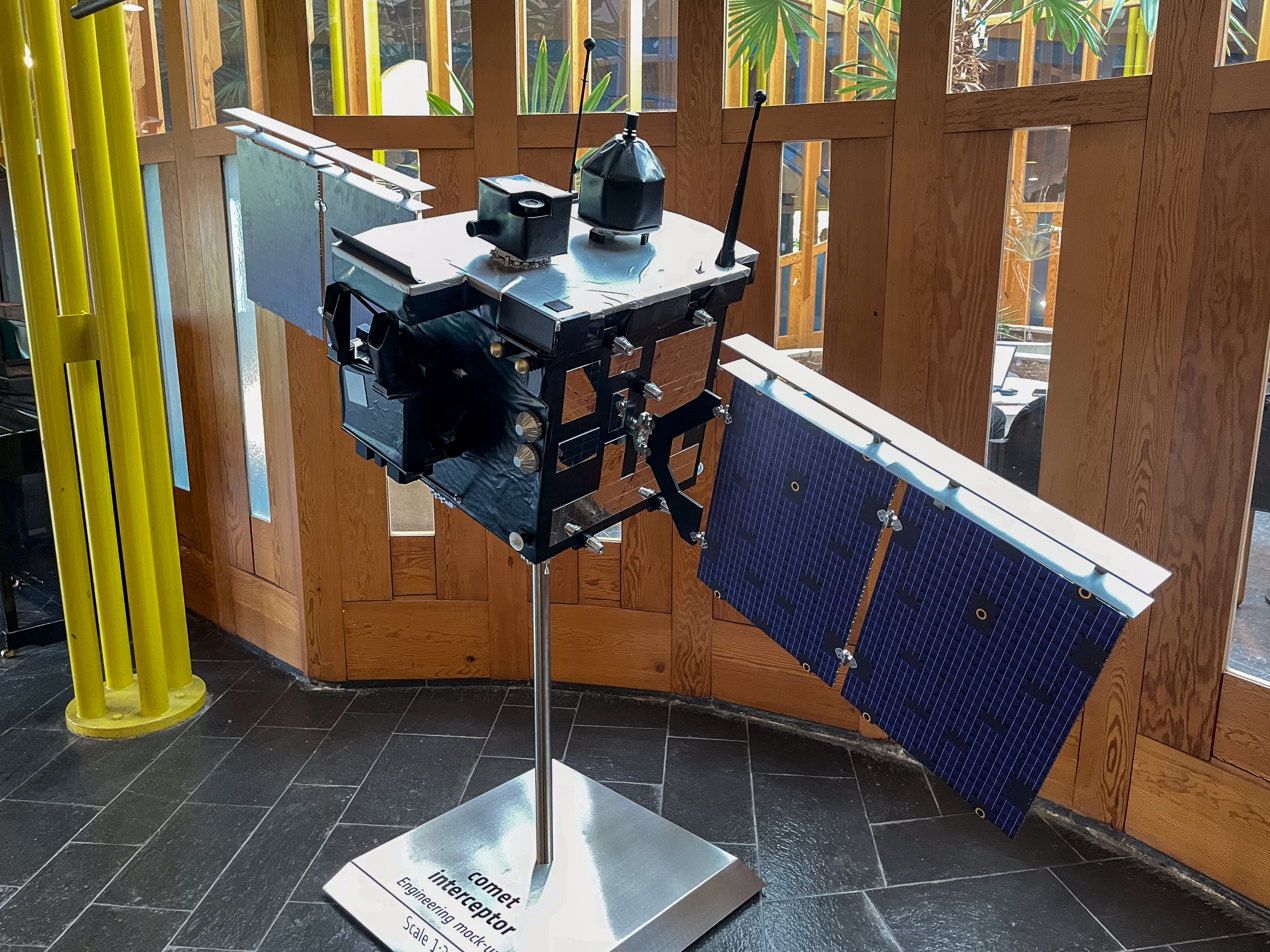
Model of Comet Interceptor in 2024

Long-period comets have highly eccentric orbits and periods ranging from 200 years to millions of years, so they are usually discovered only months before they pass through the inner Solar System and return to the distant reaches of the outer Solar System, which is too little time to plan and launch a mission. Therefore, ESA will "park" the Comet Interceptor spacecraft on a stable halo orbit around the Sun-Earth L_{2} point and wait for the discovery of a suitable comet that it can reach for a close flyby.

The Comet Interceptor mission is unique in that it is designed to encounter an as-yet unknown target, having to wait between 2 and 3 years for a target it can reach with a reasonable change in velocity (delta-v) within a total mission length of approximately 5 years. The required impulse will be provided by a bi-propellant chemical propulsion system.

Finding a suitable comet to fly by will rely on ground-based observational surveys such as Pan-STARRS, ATLAS, or the Vera C. Rubin Observatory's Legacy Survey of Space and Time (LSST). Any target comet must be about 0.85–1.2 AU from the Sun during approach. In the case that no long-period comet can be intercepted in time, a backup short period comet (baseline: 73P/Schwassmann–Wachmann) can be studied. There is also the potential of intercepting an interstellar object passing through the Solar System, if the speed and direction permit.

== Secondary spacecraft ==
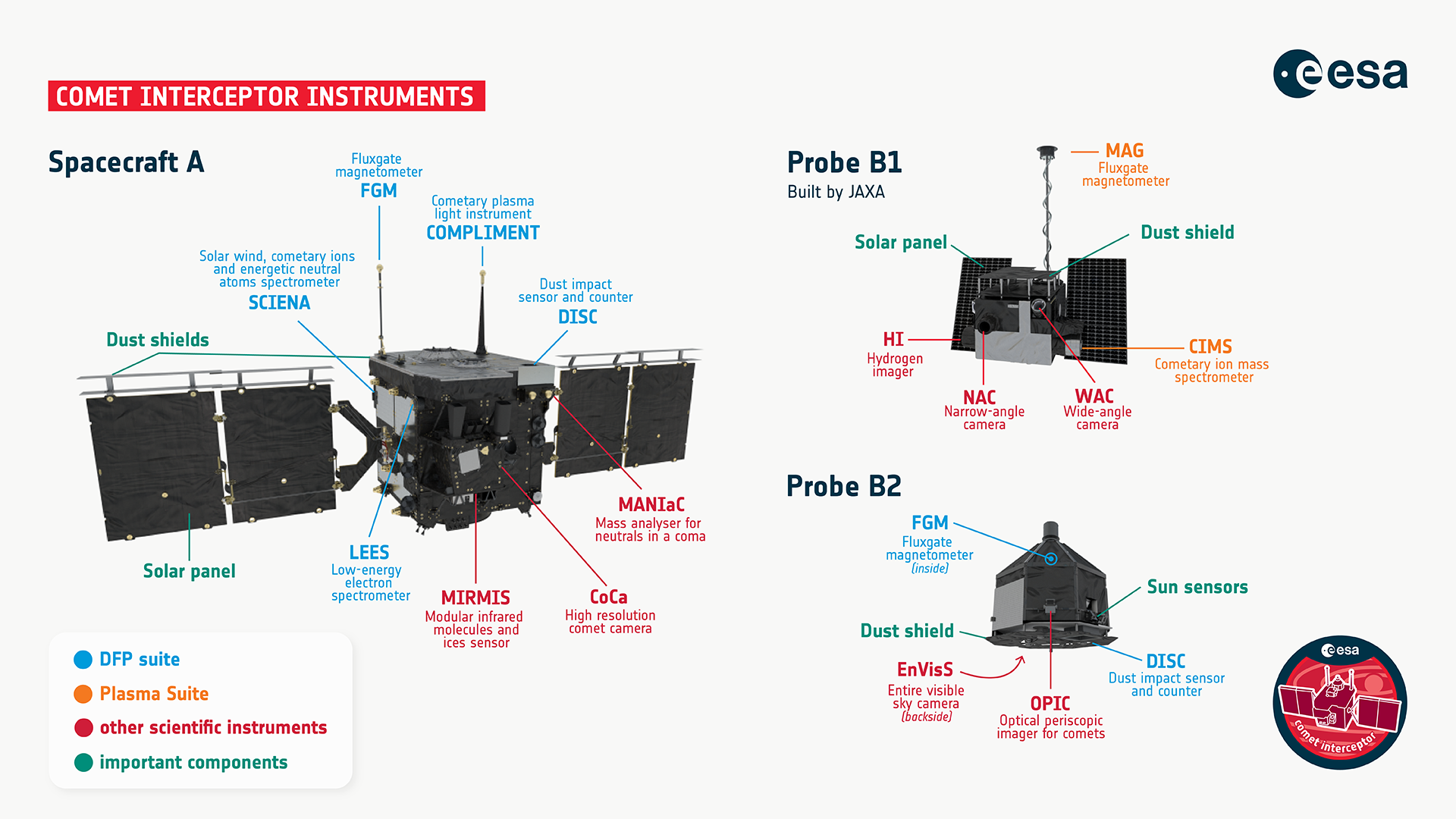
Comet Interceptor instruments

One-two days before the comet flyby, the main spacecraft (spacecraft A) will deploy two small probes (B1 and B2) to venture even closer to the target, carrying complementary instrument payloads and to sample the coma. Each of the three spacecraft will sample gas composition, dust flux, density, magnetic fields, and plasma and solar wind interactions, to build up a 3D profile of the region around the comet.

Spacecraft element	Agency	Science payload
A	ESA	CoCa: Visible/near-infrared imager MANIaC: Mass Analyzer for Neutrals and Ions at Comets (mass spectrometer); MIRMIS: NIR and Thermal IR spectral imagers, and MIR spectrometer DFP: Dust, Fields and Plasma
B1	JAXA	HI: Lyman-alpha Hydrogen imager PS: Plasma Suite; WAC: wide angle camera
B2	ESA	OPIC: Optical Imager for Comets (Vis/IR); EnVisS: Entire Visible Sky coma mapper DFP: Dust, Fields and Plasma

== Timeline ==
=== Development ===
In 2019, Comet Interceptor has been selected as ESA’s new Fast-class mission. In June 2022, the mission was adopted by ESA during the Agency’s Science Programme Committee. In December 2022, ESA and OHB have signed a contract to move forward with the design and construction of the spacecraft. In 2023, the Estonian Space Office decided to support the development of OPIC, a camera system designed by the University of Tartu. In September 2024, MMA Space was selected to provide solar panels for the Probe B1.

=== Construction ===
In July 2024, the spacecraft's magnetometer boom was undergoing vibration testing. In November 2024, the Probe B2’s structural qualification model passed all mechanical tests and was pronounced structurally sound. In December 2024, OHB Czechspace in Brno, Czechia assembled a testing article of the dust shield before transporting it to IABG test facilities in Germany.

In May 2025, ESA received results of the Latvian project CI3D — photorealistic computer-generated images that will be used for testing the spacecraft's cameras under various conditions around the unknown target body. Redwire Corporation has also delivered the spacecraft's flight computer.

In May 2026, SENER received the first flight models of the Dust Field & Plasma (DFP) instruments for the B2 probe from the Space Research Centre of Polish Academy of Sciences.

== See also ==
- List of European Space Agency programmes and missions
