= Hayabusa Mk2 =

Proposed Japanese space mission

Hayabusa Mk2 (Hayabusa Mark2, はやぶさ Mk2; "Peregrine Falcon Mark Two") was a proposed Japan Aerospace Exploration Agency (JAXA) space mission aimed at visiting a small asteroid and returning a sample to Earth for laboratory analysis. It was intended to be the follow-on mission to JAXA's Hayabusa mission, as well as the Hayabusa2 mission. The latest proposal for Hayabusa Mk2 stated its target to be the dormant comet 4015 Wilson–Harrington (1979 VA), with a launch of the probe in 2018. From 2007 to 2010, it was also considered as a joint JAXA-ESA (European Space Agency) mission under the name Marco Polo. The in-situ investigation and sample analysis would allow scientists to improve our knowledge of the physical and chemical properties of a small Near-Earth Object (NEO) which is thought to have kept the original composition of the solar nebula in which planet formed. Thus, it would provide some constraints to the models of planet formation and some information on how life may have been brought to Earth. Information on the physical structure will help defining efficient mitigation strategies against a potential threatening object.

== Scientific objectives ==
Small bodies, as primitive leftover building blocks of the Solar System formation process, offer clues to the chemical mixture from which the planets formed some 4.6 billion years ago. Current exobiological scenarios for the origin of life invoke an exogenous delivery of organic matter to the early Earth: it has been proposed that carbonaceous chondrite matter (in the form of planetesimals or dust) could have brought these complex organic molecules capable of triggering the pre-biotic synthesis of biochemical compounds on the early Earth. Moreover, collisions of NEOs with Earth pose a finite hazard to life. For all these reasons, the exploration of such objects is particularly interesting and urgent.

The principal scientific objective of the Hayabusa Mk2 mission is to return unaltered materials from a NEO. Hayabusa Mk2 will allow us to analyze the samples in terrestrial laboratory, and to obtain measurements that cannot yet be performed from a robotic spacecraft (e.g. dating the major events in the history of a sample: laboratory techniques can determine the time interval between the end of nucleosynthesis and agglomeration, the duration of agglomeration, time of accumulation, crystallization age, the age of major heating and degassing events, the time of metamorphism, the time of aqueous alteration, and the duration of exposure to cosmic radiation).

Moreover, the mission will allow scientists to:

- Determine the physical and chemical properties of the target body, which are representative of the building blocks of the terrestrial planets.
- Identify the major events (e.g. agglomeration, heating, aqueous alteration, solar wind interactions ...) which influenced the history of the target.
- Determine the elemental and mineralogical properties of the target body and their variations with geological context on the surface.
- Search for pre-solar material yet unknown in meteoritic samples.
- Investigate the nature and origin of organic compounds on the target body.
- Search for organic compounds which may shed light on the origin of pre-biotic molecules.
- Understand the role of minor body impacts in the origin and evolution of life on Earth.

NEOs are among the most accessible bodies of the Solar System.

== Naming ==
The Hayabusa Mk2 was actually proposed before Hayabusa2. Unlike Hayabusa2, which reused most of Hayabusa's design, for Hayabusa Mk2 JAXA intended to completely revise the designs and make a larger spacecraft. These are the reasons why this project is called "Hayabusa Mk2", rather than "Hayabusa3".

== Marco Polo ==
Marco Polo was a proposed ESA-JAXA space mission aimed at visiting a small primitive asteroid and returning a sample to Earth for analysis in laboratories. It was proposed to the program Cosmic Vision 2015–2025 of ESA in June 2007 and selected for an assessment study in November 2007.

This NEO sample return mission was planned to take advantage of the heritage/expertise of several European (Huygens, Philae) and Japanese (Hayabusa) missions, allowing both parties to increase their technological capabilities and thus meet a challenging objective.

A number of possible targets of high scientific interest were selected and covers a wide spectrum of possible launch windows in the time span 2015–2019, namely

• the C-type asteroid 1999 JU3, as a representative of the numerous primitive population of the C (carbonaceous) taxonomic type asteroids; another C-type asteroid may be considered, namely 1989 UQ.

• asteroids which belong to the primitive D and T types, namely 2001 SG286 and 2001 SK162, respectively;

• the dormant comet 4015 Wilson–Harrington (1979 VA), which can provide insights on the unknown link between asteroids and comets;

• the primitive C-type double asteroid 1996 FG3, which can provide insight into binary formation processes.

A baseline mission scenario to 1999 JU3 would have included a launch with a Soyuz-type launcher of a mother Spacescraft (MSC) possibly carrying a Lander, a sampling device, a re-entry capsule and scientific payloads. The Lander would perform a soft landing, anchor to the asteroid surface, and make various in-situ measurements of surface/subsurface materials near the sampling site. Samples will be collected with either one or complementary techniques. Once the sampling and in-situ measurements will be completed, the MSC will start the return journey towards Earth and will release the capsule for the high-speed re-entry into Earth's atmosphere. The capsule will be retrieved on ground at a low to mid latitude, uninhabited area, possibly in the Northern Hemisphere. After appropriate space quarantine and sterilization processes, samples will be taken out of the capsule in a dedicated sample curation facility to conduct initial sample characterization, prior to their distribution to designated scientists for detail analyses.

The Marco Polo proposal was supported by more than 400 confirmed scientists worldwide and was prepared by a joint European Japanese group.

This mission was in competition with a few other proposals for the next selection phase at ESA in fall 2009. In February 2010, ESA announced that it has chosen the Euclid, Solar Orbiter, and PLATO missions to enter the definition phase, and Marco Polo was not selected by the SPC for further study. Had it been selected, its study would have continued at least until October 2011, when the SPC selected two missions (Solar Orbiter and Euclid) for implementation.

Following Marco Polo's rejection, talks between JAXA and ESA regarding Marco Polo ended, making a joint sample return mission unlikely to happen. JAXA continued research for this spacecraft, and changed its name back to its original Hayabusa Mk2. Meanwhile, scientists who were working for Marco Polo on the European side reused designs intended for Marco Polo to propose a new mission, the MarcoPolo-R, with a possible partnership with NASA. This proposal was submitted to the Cosmic Vision M3 call. MarcoPolo-R was eventually rejected and the PLATO mission was selected instead.

== Technology demonstrators for Hayabusa Mk2 ==
Some of the technologies planned to be used for the Hayabusa Mk2 mission have never been tested in outer space. In order to reduce the risk in this project, several technology test missions specifically intended for Hayabusa Mk2 have been proposed.

=== DESTINY ===
DESTINY, short for Demonstration and Experiment of Space Technology for INterplanetary voYage, is a technology demonstration satellite and a candidate for JAXA's second "Competitively-Chosen Medium-Sized Focused Mission", following SLIM(M-class 1). If selected, DESTINY will be launched in 2020 on an Epsilon rocket. One of its main objectives is to test the μ20 ion engine intended to be used for the Hayabusa Mk2 and Solar-D missions.

=== DASH-II ===
Since the return capsule of Hayabusa Mk2 will enter Earth's atmosphere at the velocity beyond 14 km/s, a technology demonstrator called DASH-II was proposed within the JAXA Space Exploration Center (JSPEC). DASH-II is the successor to the unsuccessful DASH (Demonstrator of Atmospheric Reentry System with Hypersonic Velocity) project, launched in 2002, and will be used to demonstrate the thermal protection system (TPS) vital for the Hayabusa Mk2 reentery capsule. The estimated aerodynamic heat load on the capsule is extremely high (at least 20 MW/m2) even by selecting a shallow entry flight path angle. Because the ground heating facilities for TPS development never simultaneously duplicate the flight environment quantities such as the heat flux, the flow enthalpy, the chemical composition, the dynamic pressure, and the radiation so on, a real flight experiment is likely to be necessary. The main objective of the mission is to acquire and demonstrate the reentry/entry technologies associated with future planetary exploration and high-speed reentry missions. DASH-II was supposed to be launched by the same H-IIA rocket with the cancelled ASTRO-G space craft, as a subpayload, on 2013. In 2008, DASH-II was in Pre-Phase-A (working group activities).

== Payloads ==
The MSC scientific payloads have to include a high resolution imaging system, visible and infrared and mid spectrometers, a LIDAR, and a dust monitor. These instruments will be operated during the approach, hovering and descent phases for science purpose, for landing site selection and for spacecraft safety during near-surface manoeuvres. The Lander would have its own payload for the characterization of the in situ measurements (e.g., close-up camera, panoramic camera, electron microscope, X-ray diffractometer, volatile detector, microbalance, mass spectrometer). Instruments on the Lander would be operated in situ through automatic and/or Earth commanded sequences. These instruments should also allow us to characterize location and surface environment on site of the sampling. The scientific objectives of the mission will be attained by the combination of the following characterisations with the analyses of the returned samples:

1. morphological surface properties;
2. environment conditions (e.g. dust, gravity field...);
3. mass, volume and bulk density;
4. mineralogical composition;
5. surface (and possibly subsurface) mineralogy and thermophysical properties (thermal inertia, conductivity, diffusivity, cohesion of the materials....);
6. surface elemental composition and distribution;
7. overall internal structure properties;
8. global topography;
9. volatile abundance.

== Key capabilities ==
The Hayabusa Mk2 mission is innovative and would greatly contribute to:

- testing new technology developments: re-entry capsule, sampling technique, on board artificial intelligence, telecommunication, in situ energy, planetary protection.tools....;
- preparing the next generation of laboratory facilities for extraterrestrial sample analysis;
- having a pathfinder for sample returns from high gravity bodies and later on for human missions that may use asteroid resources to facilitate human exploration and the development of space.
