= ARIEL =

European space telescope

Ariel
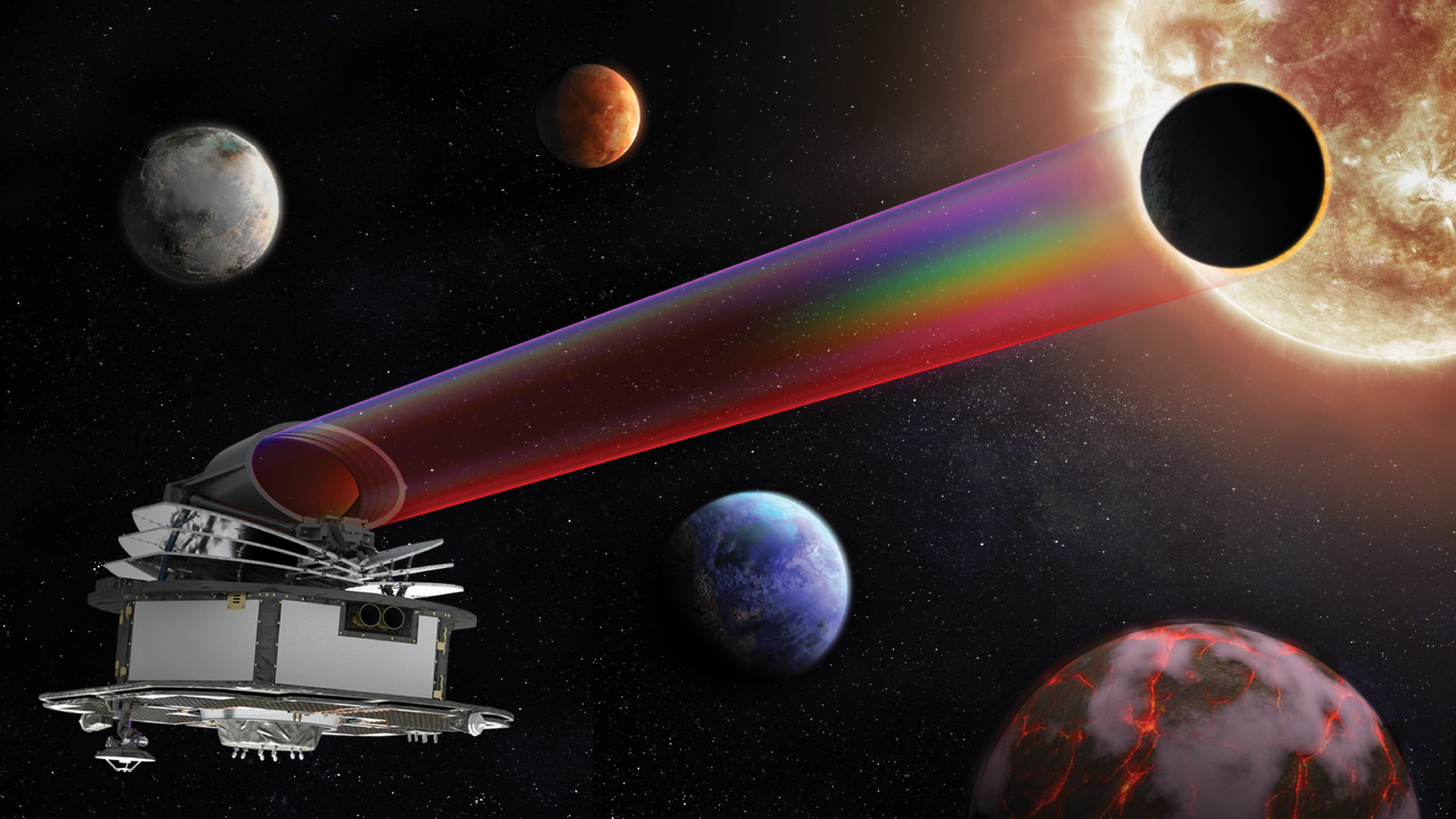
- Names: Atmospheric Remote-sensing Infrared Exoplanet Large-survey
- Mission type: Space telescope
- Operator: European Space Agency
- Website: esa.int: Ariel arielmission.space
- Mission duration: 4 years (planned)

Spacecraft properties
- Launch mass: 1,300 kg (2,900 lb)
- Dry mass: 1,000 kg (2,200 lb)
- Payload mass: 300 kg (660 lb)

Start of mission
- Launch date: 2031 (planned)
- Rocket: Ariane 62
- Launch site: Guiana Space Centre, Kourou, ELA-4
- Contractor: Arianespace

Orbital parameters
- Reference system: Sun–Earth L_{2} orbit

Main Cassegrain reflector
- Diameter: 1.1 × 0.7 m
- Focal length: f/13.4
- Collecting area: 0.64 m^{2}
- Wavelengths: visible and near-infrared

Instruments
- Telescope assembly (TA); Ariel infrared spectrometer (AIRS); Fine Guidance System (FGS)
- ESA insignia Cosmic Vision (Science Programme)

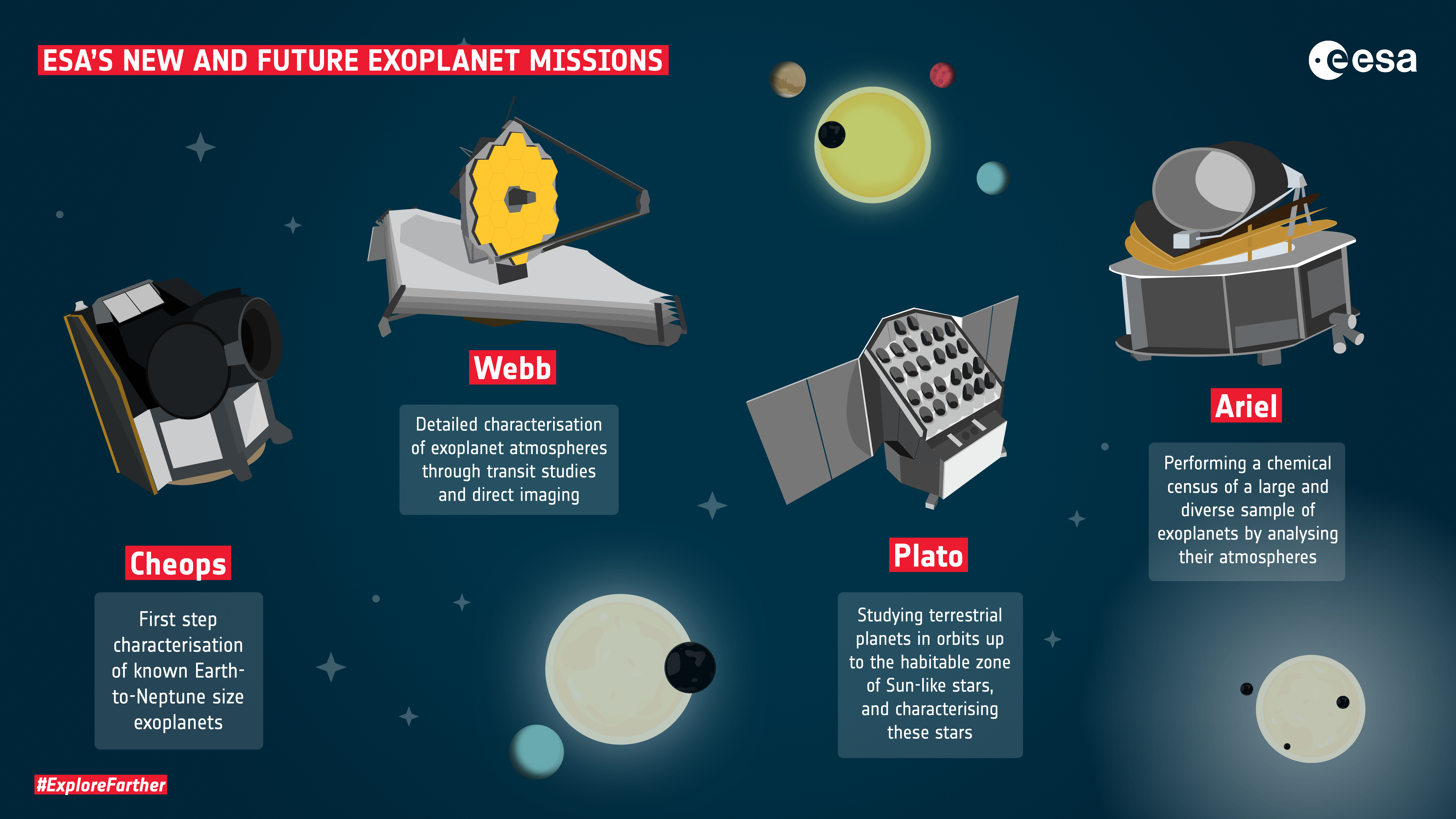
ESA's exoplanet missions

Ariel (Atmospheric Remote-sensing Infrared Exoplanet Large-survey) is a planned space telescope and the fourth medium-class mission of the European Space Agency's Cosmic Vision programme. The mission is aimed at observing at least 1,000 known exoplanets using the transit method, studying and characterising the planets' chemical composition and thermal structures. Compared to the James Webb Space Telescope, Ariel will be a much smaller telescope with more observing time available for planet characterisation. Ariel was expected to be launched in 2029 aboard an Arianespace Ariane 6 together with the Comet Interceptor into the Sun-Earth Lagrange point L_{2.} However as of January 2026, it is likely to be delayed until 2031.

== Background ==
The Ariel mission is being developed by a consortium of various institutions from eleven member states of the European Space Agency (ESA), (Note: These are the University of Vienna from Austria, the Universities of Leuven and Liège from Belgium, the Technical University of Denmark, the CEA, CNES, Paris Institute of Astrophysics, Marseille, Côte d'Azur, and Paris Observatories in France, the Max Planck Society and University of Hamburg in Germany, SRON and the Universities of Amsterdam, Delft, and Leiden in the Netherlands, the Space Research Centre of Polish Academy of Sciences, the CAB, Institute of Space Sciences and the Institute of Astrophysics of the Canary Islands in Spain, University of Bern in Switzerland, and the ATC and the Universities of Cardiff, Exeter, Hertfordshire, Keele, Leicester, London, and Oxford in the United Kingdom.) and international contributors from four countries. (Note: These are the Université de Montréal and the University of Toronto in Canada, the ELSI, Tokyo Institute of Technology, and Osaka University in Japan, the National Autonomous University of Mexico, and Caltech, the Lunar and Planetary Laboratory (LPL) and Jet Propulsion Laboratory (JPL), Lunar and Planetary Institute, and Universities of Arizona State, Chicago, and Princeton in the United States.) The project is led by principal investigator Giovanna Tinetti of the University College London, who had previously led the unsuccessful Exoplanet Characterisation Observatory (EcHO) proposal for the M3 Cosmic Vision launch slot.; alongside RAL Space, STFC for the PLM engineering consortium leadership.

Operations of the mission and the spacecraft will be handled jointly by ESA and the consortium behind the mission's development, through a coordinated Instrument Operations and Science Data Centre (IOSDC). A Mission Operations Centre (MOC) will be set up at the European Space Operations Centre (ESOC) in Darmstadt, Germany, while a concurrent Ariel Science Operations Centre (SOC) will be set up at the European Space Astronomy Centre (ESAC) near Madrid, Spain. The MOC will be responsible for the spacecraft itself, while the SOC will be responsible for archiving mission data and scientific data downlinked from the spacecraft. The IOSDC will help develop results from the mission based on data received by the SOC.

== Objective ==
Ariel will observe 1,000 planets orbiting distant stars and make the first large-scale survey of the chemistry of exoplanet atmospheres. The objective is to answer fundamental questions about how planetary systems form and evolve. A spectrometer will spread the light into a spectrum and determine the chemical fingerprints of gases in the planets' atmospheres. This will enable scientists to understand how the chemistry of a planet links to the environment in which it forms, and how its formation and evolution are affected by its parent star. Ariel will study a diverse population of exoplanets in a wide variety of environments, but it will focus on warm and hot planets in orbits close to their star.

== Spacecraft ==
The design of the Ariel spacecraft is based on that intended for the Exoplanet Characterisation Observatory (EChO) mission, and has heritage from the thermal design of the Planck space observatory. The body of the spacecraft is split into two distinct modules known as the Service Module (SVM) and the Payload Module (PLM). The PLM will complete its Assembly, Integration and Test (AIT) at RAL Space, STFC. The PLM consists of three aluminium V-Grooves and three pairs of low conductivity fibreglass bipod struts supporting the PLM. A basic horizontal telescope configuration is used for the PLM itself, housing all of the spacecraft's scientific instruments and its oval 1.1 m × 0.7 m (3 ft 7 in × 2 ft 4 in) primary mirror. At launch, the spacecraft will have a fuelled mass of 1,300 kg (2,900 lb), and will have a dry mass of 1,000 kg (2,200 lb). The PLM will account for around 300 kg (660 lb) of that mass.

== Telescope ==
The Ariel telescope's assembly is an off-axis Cassegrain telescope followed by a third parabolic mirror to recollimate the beam. The telescope uses an oval 1.1 m × 0.7 m (3 ft 7 in × 2 ft 4 in) primary mirror; the imaging quality of the system is limited by diffraction for wavelengths longer than about 3 μm, and its focal ratio (f) is 13.4. The system will acquire images in the visible and near-infrared spectrum. The near-infrared sensor and its front-end driver board is the same as that of Euclid's NISP instrument. To operate its infrared spectroscope between 1.95–7.8 μm, the telescope will be cooled to a temperature of 55 K (−218.2 °C; −360.7 °F).

Ariel's 1.1-m-diameter primary mirror will be the largest telescope mirror ever constructed completely from aluminium. It will be built in a conventional way from a single large piece of metal. However, for future space telescopes, ESA is developing techniques for joining together multiple aluminium segments to form a single large mirror.

== Timeline ==
=== Development ===
In August 2017, NASA conditionally selected Contribution to ARIEL Spectroscopy of Exoplanets (CASE) as a Partner Mission of Opportunity, pending the result of ESA's Cosmic Vision selection. Under the proposal NASA provides two fine guidance sensors for the Ariel spacecraft in return for the participation of U.S. scientists in the mission. CASE was officially selected in November 2019, with JPL astrophysicist Mark Swain as principal investigator.

In March 2018, ESA officially selected Ariel as its fourth medium-class science mission. At that time, its launch was planned for 2028. In November 2020, Ariel moved from study to implementation phase, with a launch scheduled for 2029. On 7 December 2021, ESA announced that the €200 million contract to build Ariel's SVM had been awarded to Airbus Defence and Space. In August 2023, Ariel passed its payload Preliminary Design Review. On 6 December 2023, ESA approved the construction of Ariel while maintaining a targeted launch date of 2029.

=== Construction and testing ===
In October 2024, the mission's construction phase has started at Airbus in Toulouse, France with the assembly of Ariel's structural model.

=== Launch and trajectory ===
The Ariel spacecraft is expected to be launched in 2031 by Arianespace's Ariane 62 launch vehicle. It will be launched from the Guiana Space Centre in Kourou, French Guiana, from ELA-4 purpose-built for Ariane 6 launches. Ariel will be launched to the Sun-Earth Lagrange point L_{2}, in a position located at a distance of 1,500,000 km (930,000 mi) from Earth, where it will encounter a very stable thermal environment that is required for its operations.

== See also ==
- List of European Space Agency programmes and missions
- List of space telescopes
- CHEOPS and PLATO – Cosmic Vision exoplanetology missions
- FINESSE – NASA's cancelled mission proposal similar to ARIEL
