= Fast Infrared Exoplanet Spectroscopy Survey Explorer =

Proposed space telescope

Fast Infrared Exoplanet Spectroscopy Survey Explorer (FINESSE)
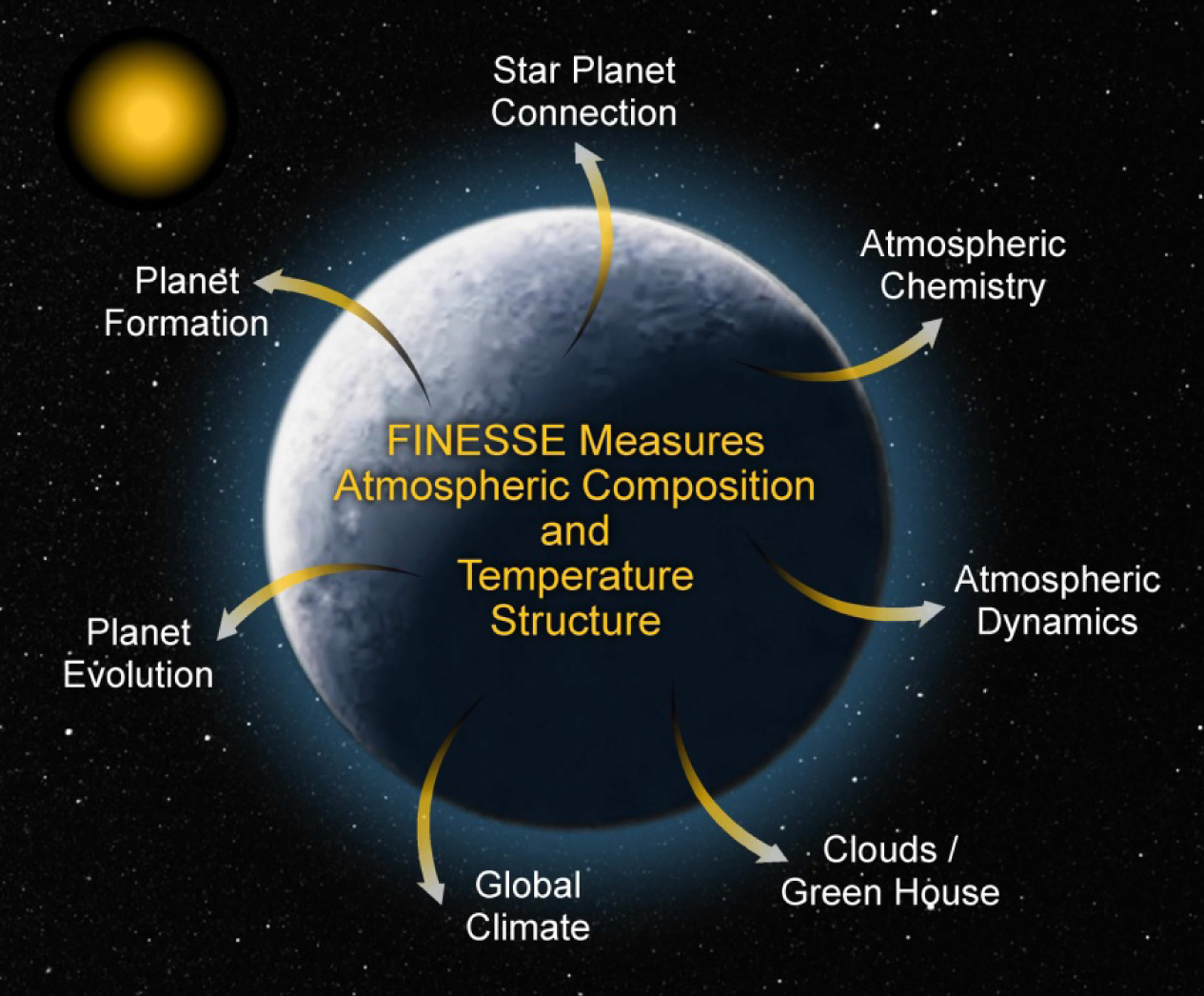
- FINESSE would provide uniquely detailed atmospheric information on exoplanets
- Mission type: Space observatory
- Operator: NASA
- Mission duration: 2 years

Start of mission
- Launch date: 2023 (proposed)
- Launch site: Cape Canaveral Air Force Station

Orbital parameters
- Reference system: Earth-Sun L2 (heliocentric) orbit

Main spectrometer
- Diameter: 70 cm
- Wavelengths: Infrared (0.5 - 5 μm)
- Resolution: λ/Δλ = 80 - 300

Fast Infrared Exoplanet Spectroscopy Survey Explorer (FINESSE) was a NASA mission proposal for a space observatory operating in the Near-infrared spectrum for the Medium-Class Explorers program. The Principal Investigator was Mark Swain of the Jet Propulsion Laboratory in Pasadena, California.

FINESSE was one of three Medium-Class Explorers (MIDEX) mission concepts that received $2 million to conduct a nine-month mission concept study in August 2017. The mission study was terminated prematurely following the selection by European Space Agency of an identical concept, the ARIEL exoplanet atmosphere survey mission. Had it been selected for implementation, FINESSE would have launched no earlier than 2022 and lasted at least two years. The other two finalist concepts competing with FINESSE were Arcus (an X-ray space observatory) and SPHEREx (a near-infrared space observatory). In February 2019, it was announced that SPHEREx had been selected.

== Overview ==
FINESSE would have consisted of a space observatory tasked to study exoplanet atmospheres by spectroscopically surveying over 500 planets outside the Solar System with the goal of gaining understanding of the processes responsible for their composition, and how the Solar System fits into the larger family of planets.

FINESSE was a candidate for NASA's next Explorers program MIDEX mission, and conducted a nine-months-long Phase A study starting from August 2017 to refine its mission concept.

While FINESSE was selected as finalist for the MIDEX mission, NASA also conditionally selected the CASE proposal as an Explorers Program Partner Mission of Opportunity (PMO). FINESSE and CASE share the same Principal Investigator and science team. CASE, or Contribution To ARIEL Spectroscopy of Exoplanets, is a proposal for US participation in the European ARIEL space telescope. An exoplanet atmosphere survey mission, ARIEL is similar to FINESSE both in spacecraft capability and scientific objectives. CASE was selected on the condition that it will only be constructed if ESA selected ARIEL. At the time this was announced, it was still uncertain whether ARIEL will be ultimately selected or not. NASA had stated that if ARIEL and CASE are selected, they would not select FINESSE as the next MIDEX mission.

In March 2018, ARIEL was selected by ESA for the fourth Cosmic Vision Medium class mission (M4). Work on FINESSE was terminated as a result. Although FINESSE did not ultimately receive a flight opportunity, its goals will likely be achieved by the 2028 ARIEL mission.

== Science objectives ==
- Determine key aspects of the planet formation process. FINESSE would obtain the atmospheric composition measurements of metallicity and carbon/oxygen ratio.
- Determine key factors that establish planetary climate. FINESSE measurements would determine planetary energy budgets from the dayside to the nightside.

== Principle ==
FINESSE would have measured the atmospheric light spectra of exoplanets transiting or eclipsing their parent star. The proposed spectrometer functions in the infrared (0.5-5.0 μm). It would have used a 75 cm diameter primary mirror.

== Further reading and external links ==
- Old FINESSE website (inactive)
- Swain, M. R. (2010). Finesse - A New Mission Concept For Exoplanet Spectroscopy. American Astronomical Society. Bulletin of the American Astronomical Society. 42, p. 1064.
- Space.com - AAS Dispatch: Proposed Space Mission Would Probe Alien Atmospheres
- What is FINESSE ? - video
