= LOFT =

European Space Agency X-ray observatory

Large Observatory for X-ray Timing
- Names: LOFT
- Operator: ESA

Start of mission
- Launch date: 2025 (if selected)

Instruments
- Large Area Detector (2 - 30 keV); Wide Field Monitor (2 - 50 keV)

The Large Observatory for X-ray Timing (LOFT) is a proposed ESA space mission originally slated to launch around 2022, and now proposed to launch around 2025. The mission will be devoted to the study of neutron stars, black holes and other compact objects by means of their very rapid X-ray variability. LOFT is supported by a large international collaboration, led by researchers spread over most of the European countries, including Italy, Switzerland, Germany, Denmark, United Kingdom, Greece, Ireland, the Netherlands, Poland, Czech Republic, Spain, and with contributions from Brazil, Canada, Israel, United States and Turkey. SRON Netherlands Institute for Space Research acts as principal investigator.

The mission was submitted to the ESA Cosmic Vision M3 call for proposals, and was selected, together with other three missions, for an initial Assessment Phase.

On February 19, 2014, the PLATO mission was selected in favour of the other candidates in the programme, including LOFT. In spite of this, LOFT has been submitted to the Cosmic Vision M4 call for proposals for a planned launch date of 2025, if selected.

== Mission architecture ==
The Large Observatory for X-ray Timing mission comprises two instruments.

- Large Area Detector (LAD), a 10 m^{2} collimated X-ray detector
- Wide Field Monitor (WFM), a coded-mask wide field X-ray monitor

The Large Area Detector (LAD) achieves an effective area of ~10 m^{2} (more than an order of magnitude larger than current spaceborne X-ray detectors, e.g. RXTE) in the 2-50 keV range, yet still fitting a conventional platform and small/medium-class launcher, thanks to the monolithic design of its large area Silicon Drift Detectors (SDD).

The Wide Field Monitor (WFM) is a coded mask X-ray monitor with a large field of view (observing about 50% of the sky available to the LAD at any time), and is also based on the Silicon Drift Detector technology. Its operating energy range is the same of the LAD, i.e. 2-50 keV.

== Objectives ==
The main scientific objectives of LOFT are:

- the determination of the neutron star structure and its equation of state
- the study of the physics in strong gravitational fields, e.g. in the accretion disks around black holes
- the direct measurements of black hole mass and spin

Besides these topics, LOFT will in general study the X-ray spectra and variability for a wide range of astrophysical sources, e.g. magnetars, active galactic nuclei, cataclysmic variables, X-ray transients and gamma-ray bursts.

The capabilities of LOFT it possibly able to provide new breakthroughs in a wide range of Astrophysical research areas.

== See also ==
- EChO
- MarcoPolo-R
- STE-QUEST
- List of proposed space observatories
