= (175706) 1996 FG3 =

Near-Earth object

(175706) 1996 FG_{3}
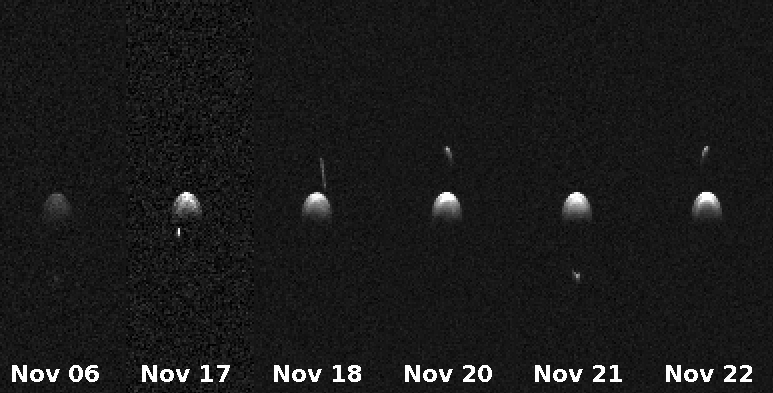
- Delay-Doppler radar images of 1996 FG_{3} and its moon from Arecibo Observatory in 2011

Discovery
- Discovered by: R. H. McNaught
- Discovery site: Siding Spring Obs.
- Discovery date: 24 March 1996

Designations
- Minor planet category: Apollo · NEO · PHA

Orbital characteristics
- Epoch 27 April 2019 (JD 2458600.5)
- Uncertainty parameter 0
- Observation arc: 17.96 yr (6,560 d)
- Aphelion: 1.4224 AU
- Perihelion: 0.6853 AU
- Semi-major axis: 1.0538 AU
- Eccentricity: 0.3497
- Orbital period (sidereal): 1.08 yr (395 d)
- Mean anomaly: 11.261°
- Mean motion: 0° 54^{m} 39.6^{s} / day
- Inclination: 1.9911°
- Longitude of ascending node: 299.69°
- Argument of perihelion: 24.052°
- Known satellites: 1 (diameter: 0.49±0.08 km) (orbital period: 16.1508 h)
- Earth MOID: 0.0283 AU (11 LD)

Physical characteristics
- Mean diameter: 1.196±0.362 km 1.55 km 1.64±0.20 km 1.69±0.18 km 1.84±0.56 km 1.90±0.28 km
- Synodic rotation period: 3.5942 h
- Geometric albedo: 0.03±0.03; 0.039±0.012; 0.042±0.035; 0.046±0.014; 0.058; 0.072±0.039
- Spectral type: SMASS = C B C/Ch; B–V = 0.708±0.005; V–R = 0.380±0.003; V–I = 0.714±0.004
- Absolute magnitude (H): 17.76; 17.833±0.024; 18.4

(175706) 1996 FG_{3} is a carbonaceous asteroid and binary system, classified as a near-Earth object and potentially hazardous asteroid of the Apollo group, approximately 1.7 kilometers (1.1 miles) in diameter. The primary has a spheroidal shape. Its minor-planet moon measures approximately 490 meters (1,600 feet) in diameter.

It was discovered on 24 March 1996, by Australian astronomer Robert McNaught at Siding Spring Observatory in New South Wales, Australia. The asteroid was a target of NASA's Janus Serenity space probe, until the delay of the rocket launch made the target inaccessible. In 2017, scientists from the Chinese Academy of Sciences' Purple Mountain Observatory revealed a plan to land a probe on this asteroid in 2029, as part of an asteroid exploration mission.

== Numbering and naming ==
This minor planet was numbered by the Minor Planet Center on 21 February 2008. As of 2021, it has not been named.

== Orbit and classification ==
1996 FG_{3} orbits the Sun at a distance of 0.7–1.4 AU once every 1 years and 1 month (395 days; semi-major axis of 1.05 AU). Its orbit has an eccentricity of 0.35 and an inclination of 2° with respect to the ecliptic. It has an Earth minimum orbital intersection distance of 0.0283 AU (4,230,000 km), which corresponds to 11.0 lunar distances. In 2019 a precovery observation from Palomar Mountain was found, extending the body's observation arc into 1985.

== Physical characteristics ==
The carbonaceous body is characterized as a rare B-type and hydrated C-type (Ch) asteroid, respectively.

=== Lightcurves ===
Several rotational lightcurves of this asteroid were obtained from photometric observations taken by astronomers Petr Pravec, Petr Scheirich and Stefano Mottola, as well as by the Very Large Telescope's VISR instrument. Lightcurve analysis gave a well-defined rotation period of 3.594 to 3.595 hours with a brightness variation of 0.08 to 0.10 magnitude (U=3/3/3/3). The asteroid is an oblate ellipsoid with a nearly spherical shape.

=== Diameter and albedo ===
According to numerous observations, including the EXPLORENEOs survey, NASA's Wide-field Infrared Survey Explorer with its subsequent NEOWISE mission and the Spitzer Space Telescope, the asteroid measures between 1.55 and 1.90 kilometers in diameter and its surface has a low albedo of 0.03 to 0.05. The Collaborative Asteroid Lightcurve Link adopts an albedo of 0.04 and a diameter of 1.90 kilometers.

== Satellite ==
During the photometric observations in December 1998, the binary nature of this asteroid was revealed. It was the first binary near-Earth asteroid for which eclipse events were detected in the visible spectrum. The binary system has a diameter ratio of 0.28, a density of 1.4 g/cm^{3}, and an ecliptic latitude of -84° for its mutual spin axis. The asteroid moon is remains undesignated. It has a diameter of approximately 490 meters, an orbital period of 16.1508 hours, and a nearly circular orbit, with an eccentricity of 0.1 and a semi-major axis of approximately 3.4 primary radii. The orbital period was later estimated to be around 16.15 hours.

== Exploration ==
=== Rejected Marco Polo mission ===
Due to its binary nature and its low delta-v heliocentric orbit, this asteroid was selected for MarcoPolo-R, which was the Marco Polo spacecraft's first proposed mission. MarcoPolo-R was originally selected for the assessment study phase in the M3 slot of ESA's Cosmic Vision program, but rejected in favor of PLATO by the end of 2012.

=== Janus spacecraft ===
The asteroid was a planned target of NASA's Janus Serenity space probe, which was scheduled to launch in 2022 alongside NASA's Psyche spacecraft, and to arrive at 1996 FG_{3} in 2026. 1996 FG_{3} became impossible to reach for Janus when the launch of Psyche was delayed.

=== Planned Chinese mission ===
In 2017, Chinese scientists announced they plan to land a probe on 1996 FG_{3} after 2029 as part of its asteroid exploration mission. The mission includes plans for fly-by of three asteroids (one of them is 99942 Apophis), and land on 1996 FG_{3} to conduct in situ sampling analysis on the surface, according to Ji Jianghui, a researcher at the Purple Mountain Observatory of the Chinese Academy of Sciences and a member of the expert committee for scientific goal argumentation of deep space exploration in China. The probe is also expected to conduct a fly-by of a third asteroid to be determined at a later time. The entire mission is expected to take about six years.

== See also ==
- (35107) 1991 VH, binary near-Earth asteroid and former target of the Janus Mayhem mission, until the launch delay made the target inaccessible
