= Giovanna Tinetti =

Italian astrophysicist

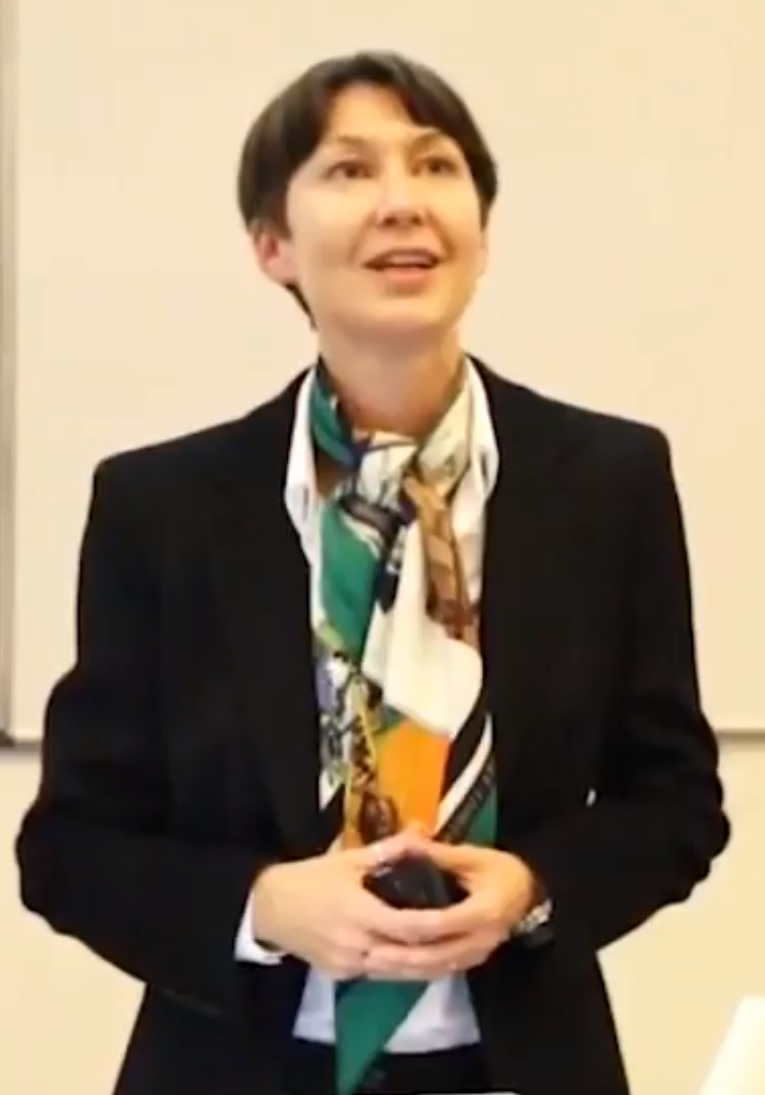
- Tinetti talks about ARIEL in 2018
- Born: 1 April 1972 (age 54); Turin
- Education: University of Turin
- Employer: King's College London
- Known for: Exoplanets

Giovanna Tinetti (born 1 April 1972) is an Italian physicist based in London. She is the Vice Dean (Research) for the Faculty of Natural, Mathematical & Engineering Sciences at King's College London, who researches galactic planetary science, exoplanets and atmospheric science.

== Early life and education ==
Giovanna Tinetti was born in 1972 in Turin, Italy. She earned an MA in Astrophysics in 1997 and an MSc in Fluid Dynamics and Energetics in 1998 at the University of Turin. She completed PhD in Theoretical Physics under Professor Luigi Sertorio in 2003.

== Research and career ==
Tinetti joined NASA's Jet Propulsion Laboratory in 2003 as a postdoctoral researcher and remained in NASA's Astrobiology Institute until 2005. She joined the Institut d’Astrophysique de Paris as a European Space Agency as an external fellow in 2005, where she was the first to identify water vapour in the atmosphere of a planet beyond the Solar System. She went on to secure a STFC Aurora Fellowship to pursue her research at University College London in 2007.

In 2009, Tinetti was made a research fellow of the Royal Society. She coordinated the European Space Agency's EChO Mission (Exoplanet Characterisation Observatory), which was backed by ESA, in 2013. She is the Principal Investigator of ARIEL, Atmospheric Remote-sensing Infrared Exoplanet Large-survey, one of three candidate-missions selected by European Space Agency for the next medium class (M4) science mission and now confirmed to be launched in 2028. She is Principal Investigator for the European Research Council Consolidator program Exo-Lights - Decoding the light from other worlds.

She is on the editorial board of Springer's Experimental Astronomy and of Proceedings of the Royal Society A.

== Public engagement and outreach ==
Tinetti regularly shares her enthusiasm for exoplanets and space science with non-expert audiences, contributing to websites, giving public lectures, appearing at science festivals and appearing on the television. Tinetti appears regularly on the BBC's Sky At Night and Stargazing Live. She featured in the 2012 Sky at Night Question and Answer book which accompanied the series. She has discussed the quest for exoplanets on several radio and television programs and podcasts.

In 2012, she was included in the London 2012 Olympics See Britain campaign, where recognised the "UK’s ability to harness the best from the past whilst looking to the future has created the perfect conditions for great scientific innovation".

In 2013 she released a popular science book, "I pianeti extrasolari" (Extrasolar Planets), describing the history of exoplanets, detection techniques and likelihood of finding alien life. In 2016, she was an invited speaker at the Israel Institute for Advanced Studies.

Tinetti is co-director of Blue Skies Space Limited, a commercial enterprise for space science projects. She is the Science Lead for the Citizen Science project Twinkle, a small, low-cost spectroscopy mission that decodes the light from extrasolar planets developed by Surrey Satellite Technology and UCL.

== Awards ==
- 2022: Sir Arthur Clarke Award, British Interplanetary Society and the Arthur C Clarke Foundation
- 2011: Moseley Medal & Prize, Institute of Physics
- 2009: NASA Group Achievement Award, with Mark Swain and Gautam Vasisht
- 2009: Edward Stone Award, JPL
- 1999: SIF Award for best young Italian physicist, Italian Society of Physics
- 1998: ENEA Award for best MSc thesis, Italian National Agency for Energy & Environment

== See also ==
- List of women in leadership positions on astronomical instrumentation projects
