= (35107) 1991 VH =

Binary near-Earth asteroid

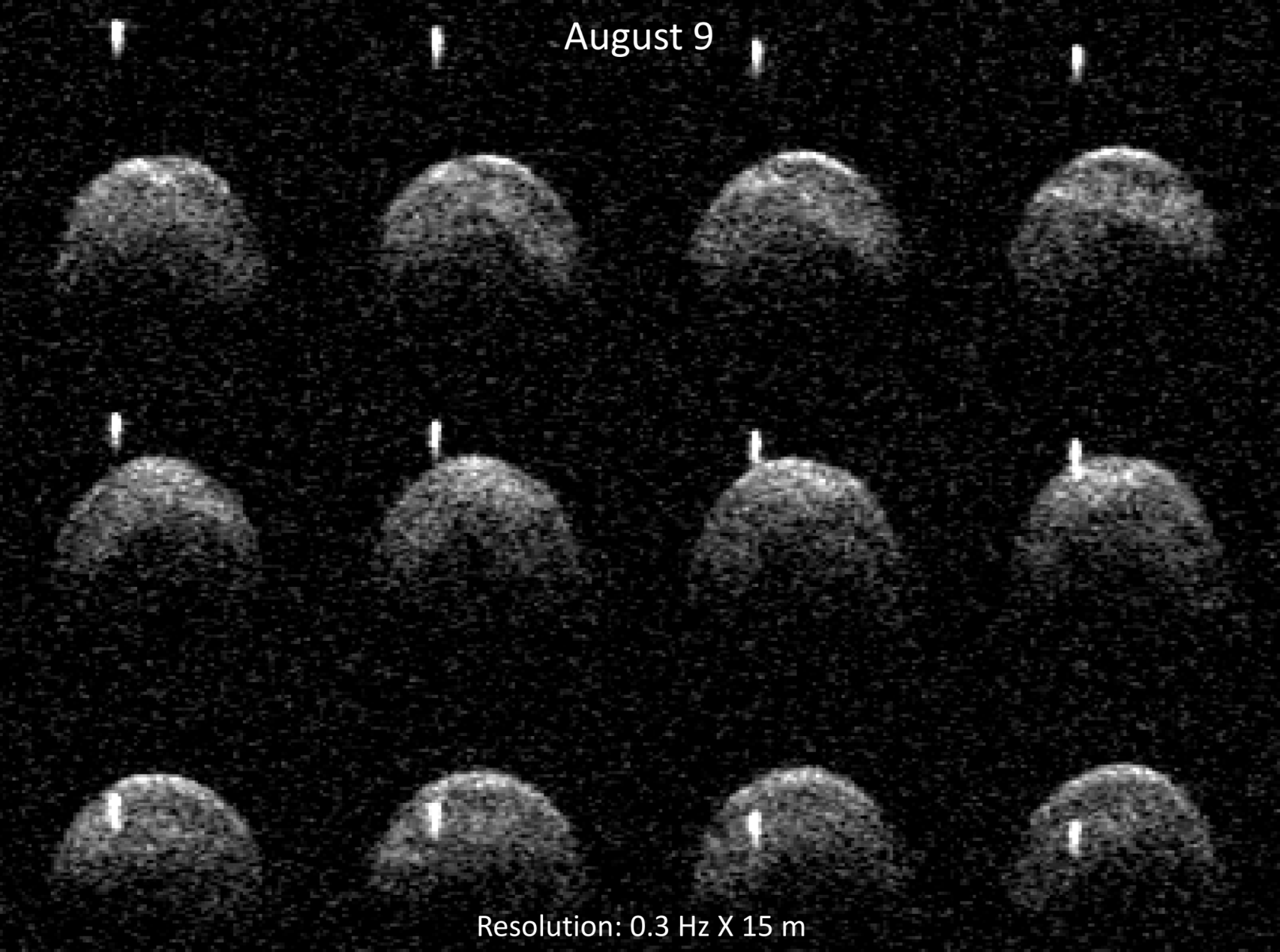
- Radar images of 1991 VH and its satellite by Arecibo Observatory in 2008

Discovery
- Discovered by: R. H. McNaught
- Discovery site: Siding Spring Obs.
- Discovery date: 9 November 1991

Designations
- Minor planet category: NEO · Apollo · PHA

Orbital characteristics
- Epoch 21 January 2022 (JD 2459600.5)
- Uncertainty parameter 0
- Observation arc: 29.34 yr (10,717 days)
- Aphelion: 1.3014 AU
- Perihelion: 0.9732 AU
- Semi-major axis: 1.1373 AU
- Eccentricity: 0.1443
- Orbital period (sidereal): 1.21 yr (443.02 days)
- Mean anomaly: 7.959°
- Mean motion: 0° 48^{m} 45.357^{s} / day
- Inclination: 13.912°
- Longitude of ascending node: 139.349°
- Argument of perihelion: 206.940°
- Known satellites: 1
- Earth MOID: 0.02467 AU (3,691,000 km; 9.60 LD)

Physical characteristics
- Dimensions: 1.30 × 1.25 × 1.18 km
- Mean diameter: 1.18±0.18 km (primary)
- Mass: (1.58±0.08)×10^{12} kg (system); 1.4×10^{12} kg (primary) (Note: Primary mass is calculated from the difference between the system mass and secondary mass: 1.44×10^{12} kg ≈ 1.58×10^{12} kg – (0.086 × 1.58×10^{12} kg).)
- Mean density: 1.7±0.8 g/cm^{3}
- Synodic rotation period: 2.6238±0.0001 h
- Geometric albedo: 0.17–0.18
- Spectral type: Sk (SMASS); V–R=0.38±0.04; R–I=0.36±0.04
- Absolute magnitude (H): 17.02±0.07 (H-G) (Note: Nugent et al's two-parameter H-G model of near-infrared WISE photometry takes the asteroid's observed opposition surge behavior into account, yielding an absolute magnitude of H = 17.02 and a slope parameter of G = 0.24. An earlier analysis by Pravec et al. used R-band photometry from 2003 observations and obtained similar results: H = 16.95±0.07 and G = 0.26±0.04); 16.76 (assumed) (Note: Default fit of photometry from the Minor Planet Center's observations database, assuming a slope parameter of G = 0.15. Because this assumption does not take the asteroid's actual opposition surge behavior into account, the absolute magnitude value H is underestimated.)

(35107) 1991 VH is a binary near-Earth asteroid and potentially hazardous asteroid of the Apollo group. It was discovered on 9 November 1991, by Australian astronomer Robert McNaught at Siding Spring Observatory. This binary system is composed of a roughly-spheroidal primary body about one kilometre in diameter, and an elongated natural satellite less than half a kilometre in diameter.

The 1991 VH system is unusual for its dynamically excited state; the satellite has a tumbling, non-synchronous rotation that chaotically exchanges energy and angular momentum with its precessing, eccentric orbit. The cause of this is not known however a likely scenario is that (35107) 1991 VH had a close planetary encounter with Earth within ~50,000 to 80,000 kilometers. Another idea, though very unlikely, is that 1991 VH experienced a significant collision event within the past million years.

This asteroid system was one of the two targets of NASA's Janus Mayhem mission, until the delay of the rocket launch made both targets inaccessible.

== Numbering and naming ==
This minor planet was numbered by the Minor Planet Center on 27 February 2002. It has not yet been named.

== Orbit ==
1991 VH orbits the Sun at a distance of 0.98–1.30 AU once every 1.21 years (443 days). Its orbit has an eccentricity of 0.14 and an inclination of 14° with respect to the ecliptic.

=== Close approaches ===
The asteroid has an Earth minimum orbital intersection distance of 0.0247 AU (3.70 million km; 2.30 million mi), which translates into approximately 9.6 lunar distances (LD). It has made multiple close approaches to Earth, with the closest being 0.0458 AU (6.85 million km; 4.26 million mi) or 17.8 LD on 15 August 2008.

== Physical characteristics ==
=== Diameter, shape, and albedo ===
High-resolution radar imaging from Goldstone and Arecibo Observatory in 2008 show that the 1991 VH primary is a roughly-spheroidal object with an equatorial ridge, bearing resemblance to a spinning top. This shape is not unique to 1991 VH as it been observed in other near-Earth asteroids; most notably 3200 Phaethon, 66391 Moshup, 101955 Bennu, and 162173 Ryugu. A number of topographical features, including a 100 m (330 ft)-wide concavity, are present along the object's equatorial ridge. A bright linear feature casting a shadow at the object's mid- to high-latitudes was also seen in the 2008 radar images.

Preliminary modeling of the primary's shape in radar images indicates dimensions of 1.30 km × 1.25 km × 1.18 km (0.81 mi × 0.78 mi × 0.73 mi), or a volume-equivalent diameter of 1.18 km (0.73 mi). The geometric albedo for the primary is 0.17–0.18, considerably lower than infrared-based estimates of 0.30–0.40.

=== Mass and density ===
The total mass of the 1991 VH system is (1.58±0.08)×10^{12} kg, based on the orbital motion of the satellite. The mass ratio of the satellite to the primary is 0.086±0.018, corresponding to a primary mass of 1.4×10^{12} kg—approximately 12 times as massive as the satellite. Given the primary mass and diameter, its density is estimated to be about 1.7±0.8 g/cm^{3}, indicative of a rubble pile internal structure.

=== Spectral type ===
In the SMASS taxonomy, 1991 VH is classified as a transitional Sk-type, which is an intermediary between the common stony S-type and the less frequent K-type asteroids.

=== Rotation ===
Photometric observations in 1997 determined a primary rotation period of 2.624 hours, with a light curve amplitude of 0.08±0.01 magnitudes (U=3). Later photometric observations from 2003 to 2020 corroborated this result down to a precision of ±0.0001 seconds.

== Satellite ==
S/2008 (35107) 1
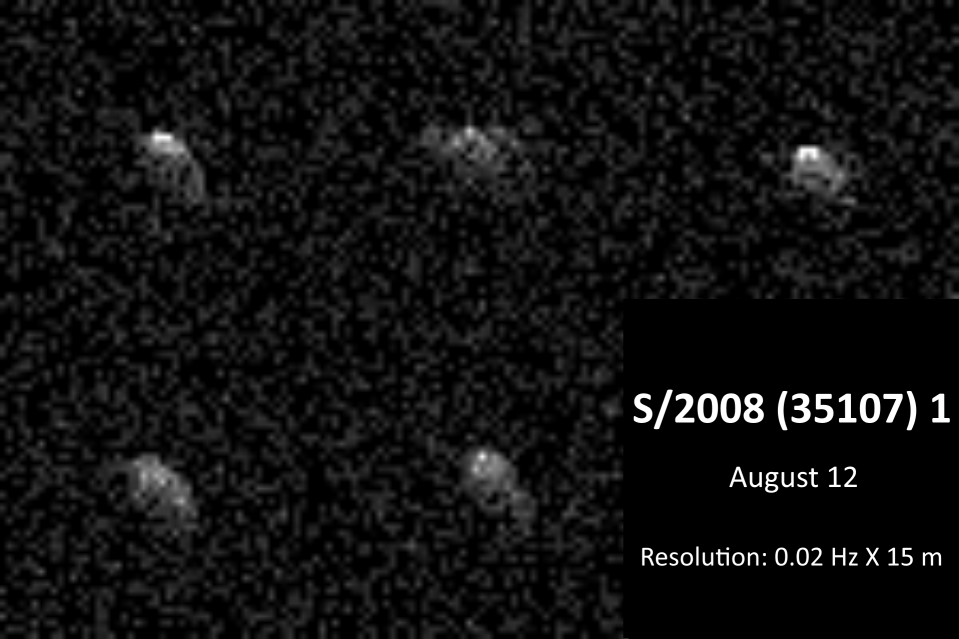
- Radar images of S/2008 (35107) 1 by Arecibo Observatory on 12 August 2008

Discovery
- Discovered by: P. Pravec; M. Wolf; L. Šarounová
- Discovery site: Ondřejov Obs.
- Discovery date: 27 February 1997

Designations
- Alternative designations: S/1997 (35107) 1 [spurious designation at JPL]

Orbital characteristics
- Semi-major axis: 3.32±0.07 km
- Eccentricity: 0.05±0.02
- Orbital period (sidereal): 32.57±0.3 h (1.357±0.012 d)
- Inclination: 148°±9° (wrt ecliptic)
- Longitude of ascending node: 270°±30°

Physical characteristics
- Dimensions: a/b = 1.33±0.10
- Mean diameter: 0.42±0.08 km (D_{s}/D_{p}=0.40±0.02)
- Mass: 1.4×10^{11} kg (Note: Secondary mass is calculated from the product of the system mass and secondary/primary mass ratio: 1.4×10^{11} kg ≈ 0.086 × 1.58×10^{12} kg.)
- Synodic rotation period: 11–16 h (chaotic)
- Absolute magnitude (H): 17.2 (Δmag=0.2)

S/2008 (35107) 1 is the secondary component and natural satellite of the 1991 VH system.

=== Discovery ===
S/2008 (35107) 1 is among the first near-Earth asteroid satellites discovered, alongside those of (385186) 1994 AW1 and 3671 Dionysus. It was discovered on 27 February 1997, by astronomers Petr Pravec, Marek Wolf, and Lenka Šarounová at Ondřejov Observatory. The satellite was detected through photometric observations of periodic dips in the system's brightness, caused by mutual eclipses and occultations of the components. The discovery of the satellite was reported in a notice published by the International Astronomical Union on 29 March 1997, but was not officially confirmed until it was individually resolved in adaptive optics imaging by the Keck II telescope at Mauna Kea Observatory on 9 August 2008. The satellite was given the provisional designation S/2008 (35107) 1 on 19 September 2008.

=== Origin ===
As with many binary near-Earth asteroids, the 1991 VH system is thought to have formed through rotational fissioning of a progenitor body due to spin-up by the YORP effect. The resulting mass shed from the progenitor body coalesced in orbit to form the satellite.

== Exploration ==
This asteroid system was the target of NASA's Janus Mayhem mission, which was planned to launch in 2022 alongside NASA's Psyche spacecraft, and to arrive in 2026. 1991 VH became impossible to reach for Janus when the launch of Psyche got delayed in May 2022.

== See also ==
- (175706) 1996 FG3, binary near-Earth asteroid and former target of the Janus Serenity mission, until it became inaccessible due to the launch delay
