= SPHEREx =

NASA near-infrared space observatory

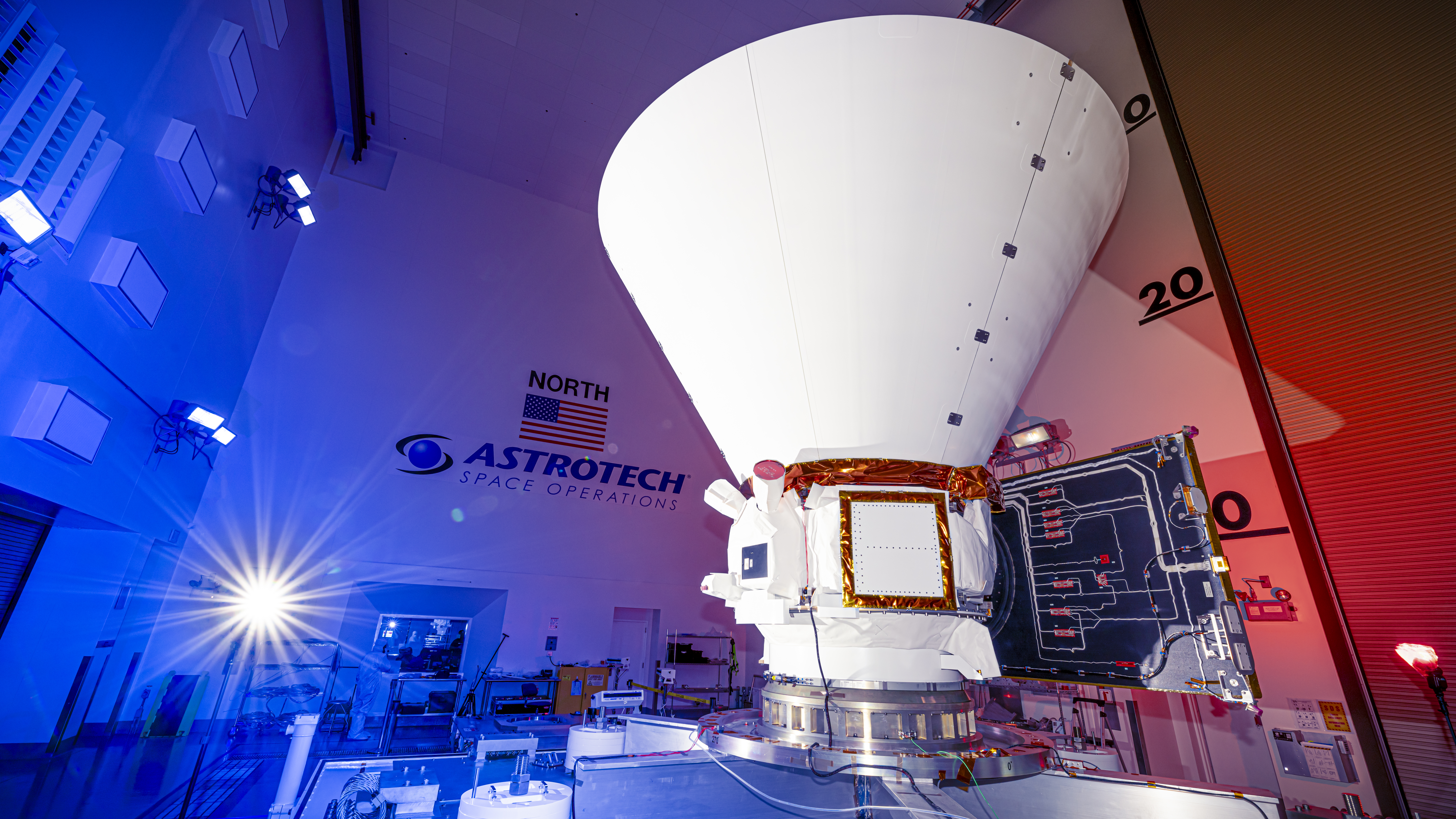
- SPHEREx on a work stand, being prepared for launch
- Names: Spectro-Photometer for the History of the Universe, Epoch of Reionization, and Ices Explorer
- Mission type: Astrophysics
- Operator: NASA
- COSPAR ID: 2025-047E
- SATCAT no.: 63182
- Website: spherex.caltech.edu
- Mission duration: Planned: 25 months Elapsed: 1 year, 3 months, 10 days

Spacecraft properties
- Manufacturer: BAE Systems Inc. (Previously Ball Aerospace & Technologies)
- Launch mass: 502 kg (1,107 lb)
- Dimensions: 2.6 m (8 ft 6 in) tall, 3.2 m (10 ft) wide and deep
- Power: 750 watts

Start of mission
- Launch date: 12 March 2025, 03:10:00 UTC (11 March 2025, 8:10 pm PDT)
- Rocket: Falcon 9 Block 5
- Launch site: Vandenberg, SLC-4E
- Contractor: SpaceX

Orbital parameters
- Reference system: Geocentric orbit
- Regime: Sun-synchronous, low Earth orbit
- Altitude: 700 km (430 mi)
- Inclination: 97°
- Period: 90 minutes

Main telescope
- Diameter: 20 cm (7.9 in)
- Wavelengths: Near-infrared

Transponders
- Band: S-band, Ka-band

Instruments
- Spectrophotometer

SPHEREx (Spectro-Photometer for the History of the Universe, Epoch of Reionization, and Ices Explorer) is a near-infrared space observatory that is performing an all-sky survey to measure the near-infrared spectra of approximately 450 million galaxies. In February 2019, SPHEREx was selected by NASA for its next Medium-Class Explorers mission, beating out two competing mission concepts: Arcus and FINESSE. SPHEREx launched on 11 March 2025 on a Falcon 9 Block 5 rocket alongside the PUNCH microsatellites from Vandenberg Space Force Base. The principal investigator is James Bock at California Institute of Technology (Caltech) in Pasadena, California.

== Overview ==
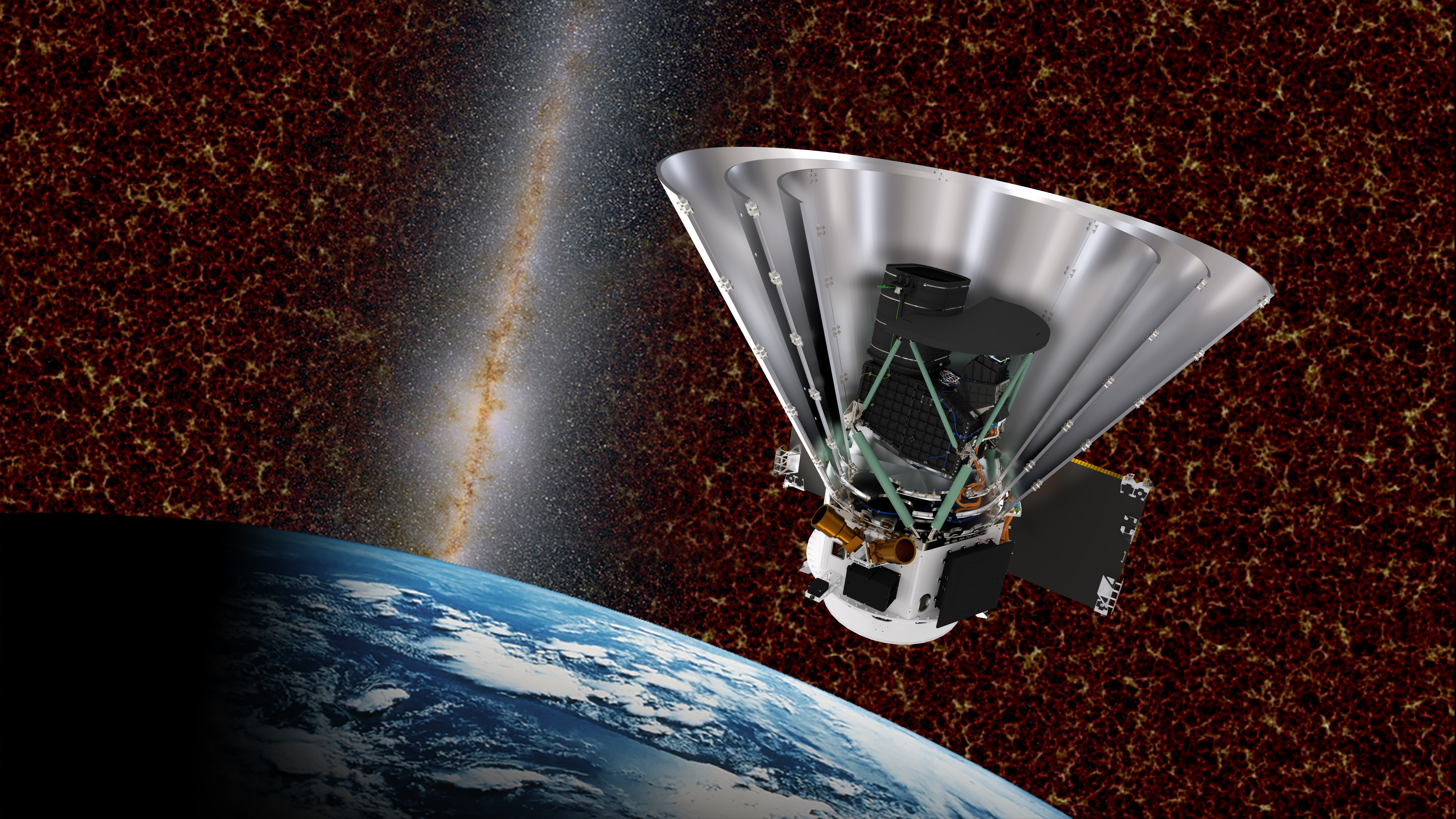
Artist's impression of SPHEREx in space

=== Mission ===
SPHEREx is using a spectrophotometer to perform an all-sky survey to measure near-infrared spectra from 0.75 to 5.0 micrometers. It employs a single instrument with a single observing mode and no moving parts as it maps the entire sky (in 96 different color bands, far exceeding the color resolution of previous all-sky maps) four times during its nominal 25-month mission; the crucial technology is a linear variable filter, as demonstrated by LEISA on New Horizons.

It will classify galaxies according to redshift accuracy, categorizing approximately 450 million galaxies and fitting measured spectra to a library of galaxy templates. Specifically, SPHEREx will probe signals from the intra-halo light and from the epoch of reionization. It would explore what drove the early universe inflation, explore the origin and history of galaxies, and explore the origin of water in planetary systems.

SPHEREx complements the Euclid and planned Nancy Grace Roman Space Telescope spectroscopic surveys. High precision redshift information of foreground galaxies provided by SPHEREx in correspondence with weak gravitational lensing measurements of background galaxies from Euclid and Nancy Grace Roman Space Telescope will allow direct measurement of the dark matter distribution surrounding the foreground galaxies. The SPHEREx low redshift survey allows its measurement of inflationary parameters to be mostly independent, thus providing a new line of evidence.

=== Spacecraft/telescope ===
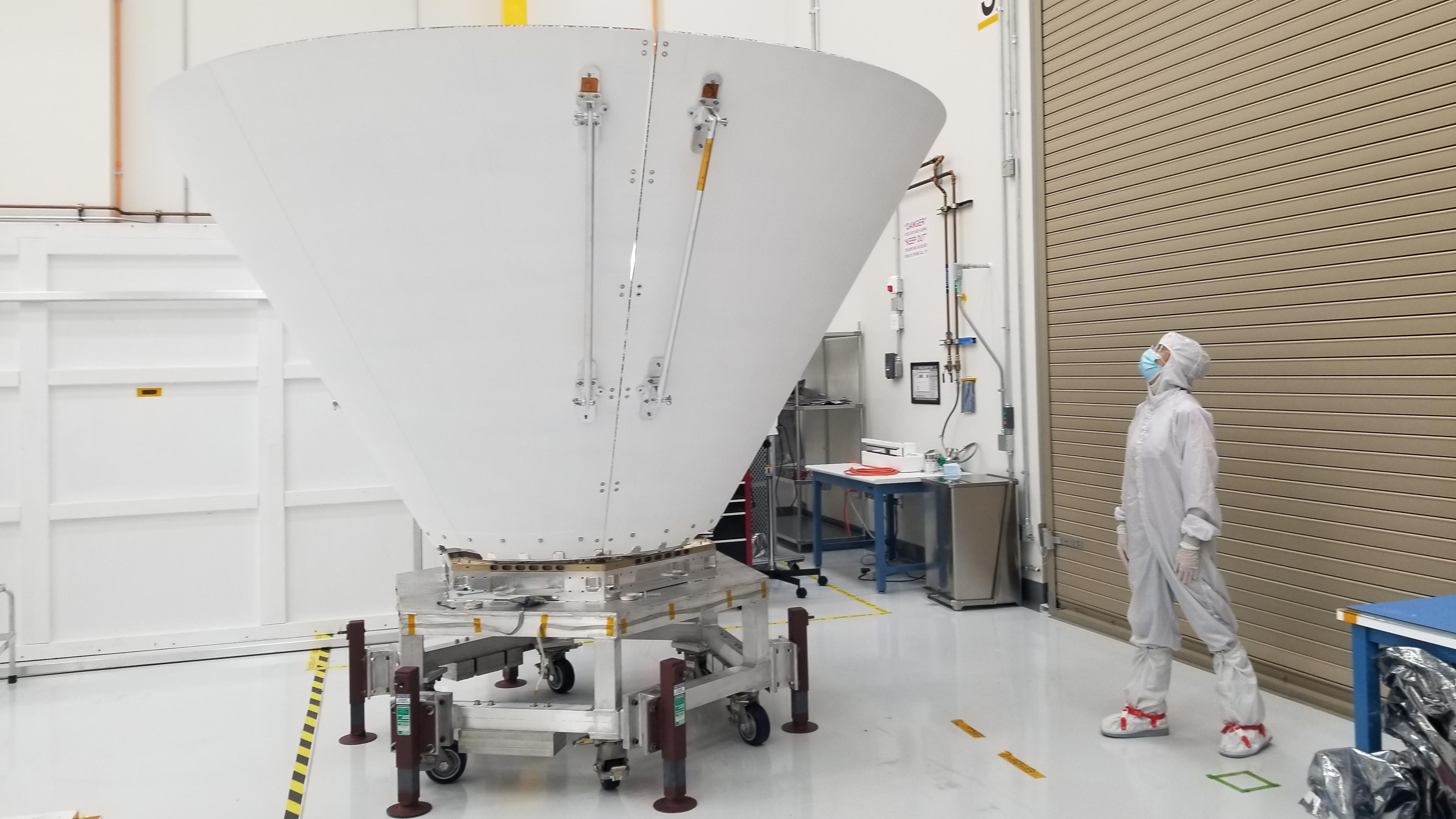
SPHEREx outer photon shield

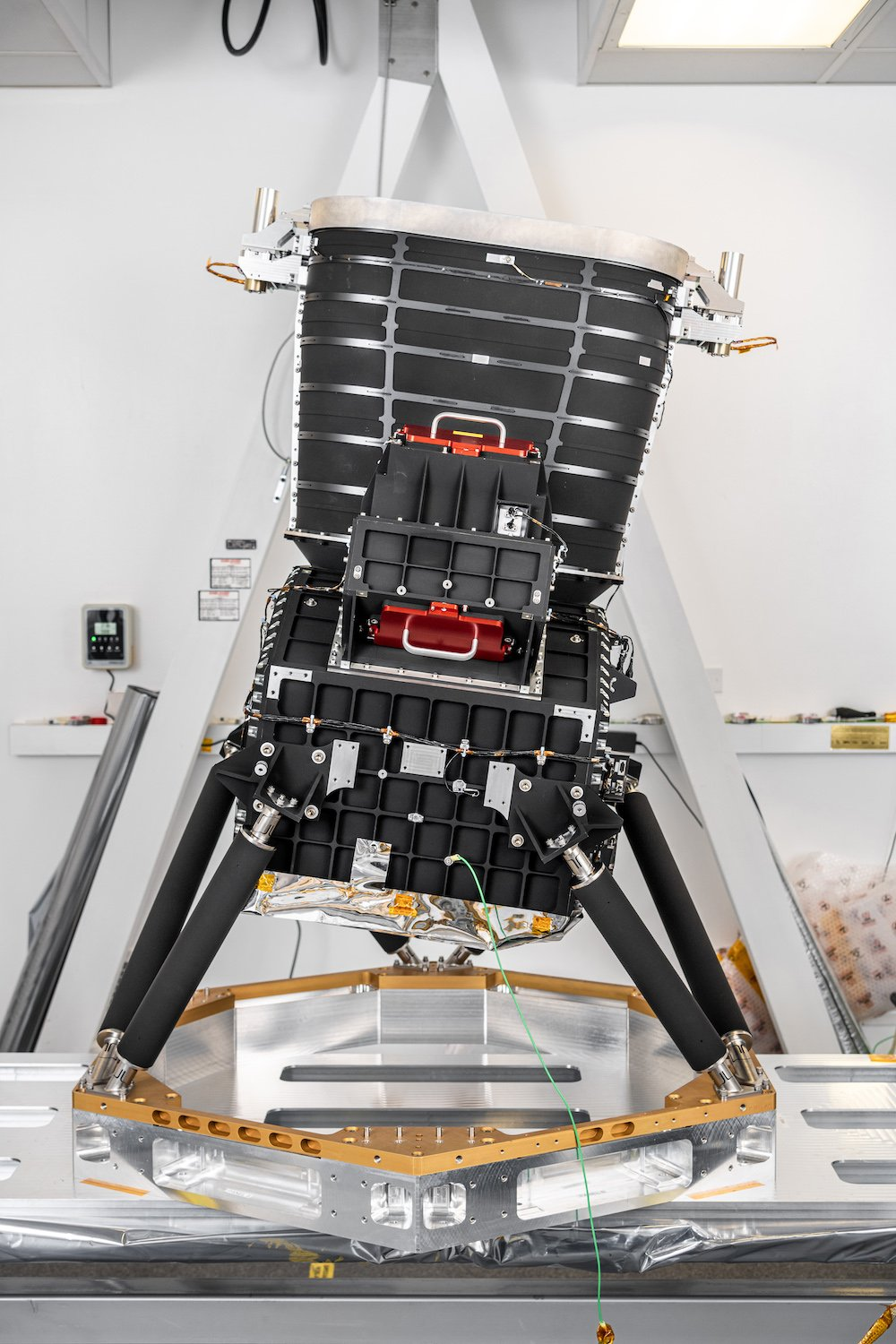
SPHEREx telescope and detectors

The triple mirror telescope has an aperture diameter of 20 centimeters with a 3.5° × 11° field of view and six 2K × 2K mercury cadmium telluride (HgCdTe) photodetector arrays. Each 2K × 2K focal-plane array is covered with a linear variable filter, providing narrow-band response with a band center that varies along one axis of the array. SPHEREx obtains spectra through multiple exposures, placing a given source at multiple positions in the field of view, where it is measured at multiple wavelengths by repointing the spacecraft.

The SPHEREx spacecraft and telescope were provided by BAE Systems Inc. Space & Mission Systems division (previously Ball Aerospace & Technologies) while the payload was developed by Caltech and NASA's Jet Propulsion Laboratory. The Korea Astronomy and Space Science Institute supplied a non-flight cryogenic test chamber.

== History ==
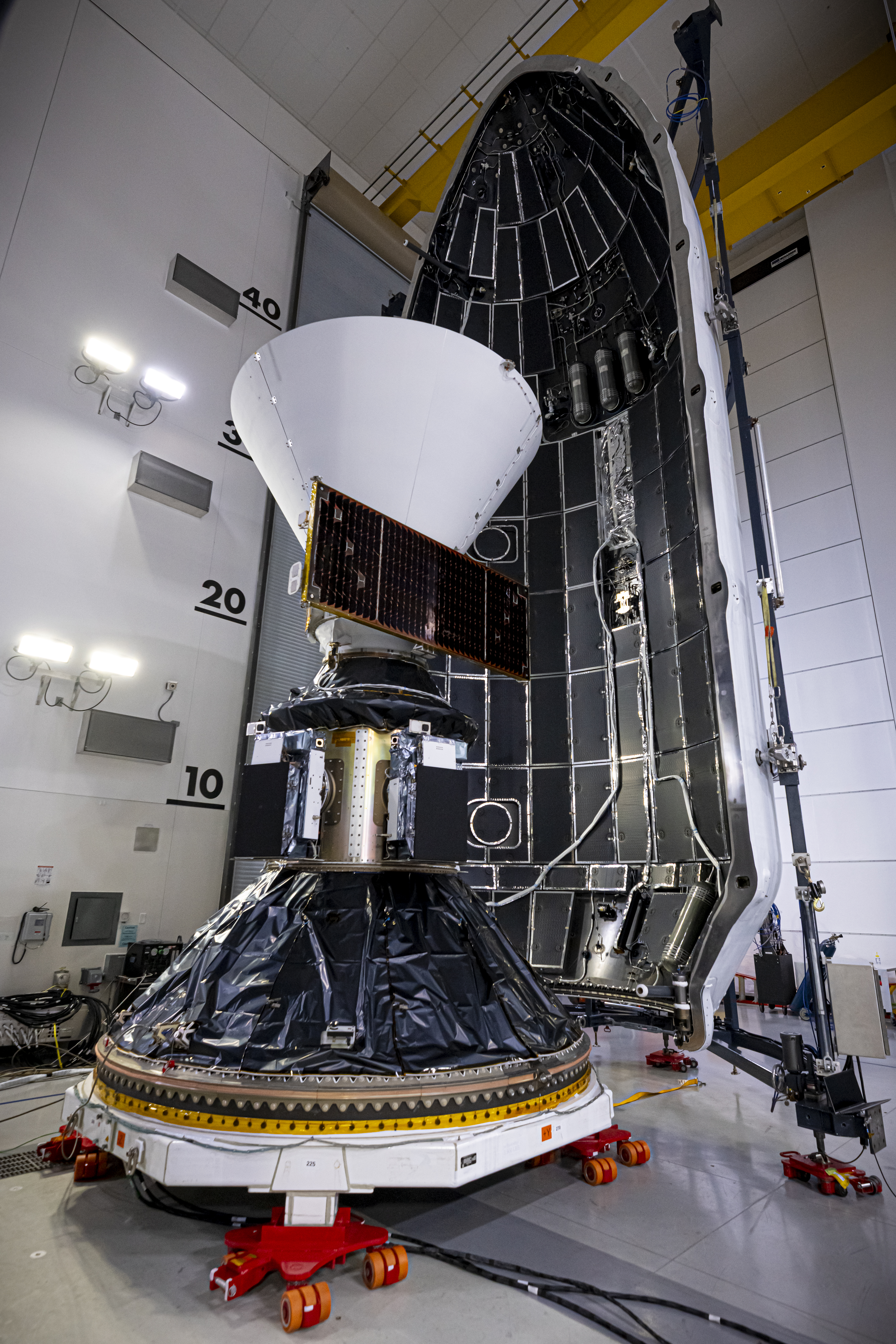
SPHEREx–PUNCH Encapsulation

The SPHEREx proposal was submitted to NASA on 19 December 2014, and it was selected for further conceptual development (Phase A) on 30 July 2015 for the Small Explorer program (SMEX). The detailed concept study report was submitted to NASA on 19 July 2016, but it was not selected for SMEX. An enhanced version of SPHEREx was submitted on 15 December 2016 as a Medium-Class Explorer (MIDEX), and it was selected as a finalist in August 2017, along two other competing missions: Arcus, and Fast Infrared Exoplanet Spectroscopy Survey Explorer (FINESSE). Each team received US$2 million to refine their mission concepts over nine-months.

SPHEREx was selected as the winner in February 2019, and the mission was approved to proceed with detailed planning. On 4 February 2021, NASA announced they had selected the SpaceX Falcon 9 to launch the spacecraft, and total cost of the launch would be US$98.8 million. In August 2022 NASA announced that the 4 microsatellites of the PUNCH constellation would be launched as rideshare payloads together with SPHEREx. The mission launched on 11 March 2025. First light was in April 2025. Regular science operation started on 1 May 2025.

The total cost of the mission (design, build, launch, and prime operations) was $488 million.
