= Janus (spacecraft) =

Cancelled NASA mission for asteroid fly-bys

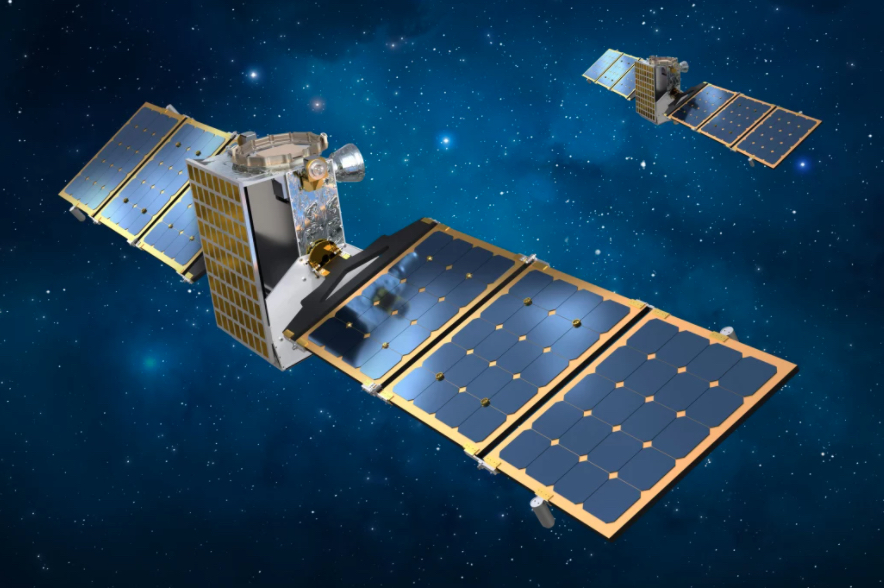
- Mission type: Asteroids flyby
- Operator: University of Colorado Boulder, NASA

Spacecraft properties
- Spacecraft: Janus Serenity and Mayhem
- Manufacturer: Lockheed Martin
- Launch mass: 36 kg (×2)
- Power: 2 solar arrays and batteries
Instruments
- ECAM-M50: Visible camera
- ECAM-IR3a: Infrared camera

Janus was a planned NASA mission that would have sent dual space probes to visit asteroids chosen prior to launch. The mission was part of NASA's SIMPLEx program and was expected to be launched in 2022 as a secondary payload on Falcon Heavy together with the Psyche spacecraft, but it was removed due to delays with Psyche. The mission budget was limited to US$55 million.

The mission was cancelled in July 2023 and both spacecraft were placed into long-term storage.

== Spacecraft ==
The two small 36 kg spacecraft —which fall under the 180 kg mass limit for SIMPLEx missions — will conduct stand-alone planetary science missions. The spacecraft is jointly developed by two teams, based at the University of Colorado Boulder (led by Daniel Scheeres) and at Lockheed Martin (led by Josh Wood).

== Instruments ==
The Janus team planned to image the two asteroids in visible and infrared light, using the ECAM-M50 (visible) and ECAM-IR3a (infrared) cameras. These cameras were developed by Malin Space Science Systems and successfully used on the OSIRIS-REx asteroid sample return mission.

== Mission ==
=== Initial plan ===
In 2020, NASA gave approval for the Janus mission to proceed to the next phase of development. The mission is managed by the Planetary Missions Program Office at NASA's Marshall Space Flight Center in Huntsville, Alabama, as part of the Solar System Exploration Program at NASA Headquarters in Washington, D.C. The program conducts space science investigations in the Planetary Science Division of NASA's Science Mission Directorate at NASA Headquarters, guided by NASA's agency priorities and the Decadal Survey process of the National Academy of Sciences. Janus is led by the University of Colorado Boulder, where the principal investigator (PI) is based, which will also undertake the scientific analysis for the mission. Lockheed Martin will manage, build and operate the spacecraft.

After riding along with the launch of NASA's Psyche mission, the Janus twins would have separated and completed an orbit around the Sun, before heading back toward Earth for a gravity assisted sling-shot, each going their separate ways to the two asteroids, (175706) 1996 FG3 and (35107) 1991 VH.

=== Delay ===
Because Psyche's launch date was moved from August 2022 to late September, new targets had to be chosen as Janus would have been unable to visit the initially chosen asteroids (175706) 1996 FG3 and (35107) 1991 VH. Psyche's launch was again delayed on June 24, 2022, to an unspecified date after the end of 2022. Janus was removed from the Psyche mission on 18 November 2022, after an assessment determined that it would not be on the required trajectory to meet its science requirements as a result of Psyche’s new launch period.

=== Cancellation ===
In July 2023, the Janus mission was cancelled "after considering the opportunities and requirements for alternative missions using the twin spacecraft, and the expected resources available to planetary science in the next few years." The spacecraft will be stored in the event that future funding enables an opportunity to use them. It has been proposed to re-purpose the Janus spacecraft to visit the asteroid Apophis ahead of its close flyby of the Earth in April 2029.
