= (65679) 1989 UQ =

Near-Earth asteroid

Discovery
- Discovered by: C. Pollas
- Discovery site: CERGA Observatory, France
- Discovery date: 26 October 1989

Designations
- Alternative designations: 1954 WZ
- Minor planet category: Aten; NEO; PHA

Orbital characteristics
- Epoch 6 June 2026 (JD 2461200.5)
- Uncertainty parameter 0
- Observation arc: 70.94 years
- Aphelion: 1.1568 AU (173.05 Gm)
- Perihelion: 0.6728 AU (100.65 Gm)
- Semi-major axis: 0.9148 AU (136.85 Gm)
- Eccentricity: 0.2645
- Orbital period (sidereal): 0.8749 yr (319.57 d)
- Mean anomaly: 151.81°
- Inclination: 1.3032°
- Longitude of ascending node: 178.05°
- Argument of perihelion: 15.005°
- Earth MOID: 0.01403 AU (2,099 Mm)
- T_{Jupiter}: 6.497

Physical characteristics
- Mean diameter: 0.918±0.01 km
- Geometric albedo: 0.033±0.007
- Spectral type: B (SMASSII)
- Absolute magnitude (H): 19.45 (JPL)

(65679) 1989 UQ is a kilometer-sized near-Earth asteroid. Classified as an Aten asteroid, it is an Earth-crosser with a relatively long dynamical lifetime. It was discovered on 26 October 1999 by astronomer Christian Pollas. It has a primitive surface composition, which has made it a candidate target of missions and mission concepts such as JAXA's Hayabusa2 and the ESA's Marco Polo.

== Observation and designation ==
1989 UQ was first spotted by Palomar Observatory in the United States on 20 November 1954 and given the provisional designation 1954 WZ by the Minor Planet Center (MPC). It was observed again on 26 October 1989 by Christian Pollas from CERGA Observatory in France. Believing it to be a new asteroid, the MPC assigned it the designation 1989 UQ. It was given the number (65679) by the MPC in 2003.

== Orbit ==
1989 UQ's orbit around the Sun has a semi-major axis of 0.92 astronomical units (AU), taking 319.6 days to complete. With an orbital eccentricity of 0.26, its distance from the Sun ranges from 0.67 AU at perihelion to 1.17 AU at aphelion. Its orbit is inclined by 1.3° with respect to the ecliptic plane. 1989 UQ is categorized as an Aten-type near-Earth object, as it is an Earth-crosser with a semi-major axis smaller than Earth's.

1989 UQ was likely transported into the inner Solar System by the ν_{6} secular resonance. Before reaching its present orbit, it likely had a much lower perihelion distance for millions of years. In the future, 1989 UQ may become an Apollo asteroid as its orbit is modified by planetary close encounters and orbital resonances. Numerical integrations show that its median lifetime in the inner Solar System is about 45.5 million years, longer than the 9 million year median lifetime of NEOs. 1989 UQ's long lifetime is consistent with an object that has evolved deeply in the Earth-crossing region.

== Physical characteristics ==
1989 UQ has an estimated diameter of 0.918 km. Its surface is dark, with a geometric albedo of 0.033. Under the SMASSII classification scheme for asteroid spectral types, 1989 UQ is categorized as a B-type asteroid. From its low albedo and spectral type, 1989 UQ appears to have a primitive composition. However, its surface has likely been heated to about 560 K, enough to break down organic macromolecules.

== Exploration ==
1989 UQ was considered as one of several candidate targets for the Marco Polo mission concept, an asteroid sample-return mission studied by the European Space Agency (ESA) under its Cosmic Vision program as a collaboration with JAXA. In early 2010, the advisory body of ESA's Science and Robotic Exploration Directorate rejected the Marco Polo concept. It was also considered as a target for the Hayabusa2 mission, but it was dropped in favor of 162173 Ryugu.
