= (612267) 2001 SG286 =

Near-Earth asteroid

(612267) 2001 SG_{286}
Discovery
- Discovered by: LINEAR
- Discovery site: Socorro, United States
- Discovery date: 27 September 2001

Designations
- Minor planet category: Apollo; NEO

Orbital characteristics
- Epoch 5 May 2005 (JD 2460800.5)
- Uncertainty parameter 0
- Observation arc: 6988 days (19.13 yr)
- Aphelion: 1.8302 AU (273.79 Gm)
- Perihelion: 0.8864 AU (132.60 Gm)
- Semi-major axis: 1.3583 AU (203.20 Gm)
- Eccentricity: 0.3474
- Orbital period (sidereal): 1.583 yr (578.231 d)
- Mean anomaly: 1.0953°
- Mean motion: 0.6226° / day
- Inclination: 7.773°
- Longitude of ascending node: 241.110°
- Argument of perihelion: 56.273°
- Earth MOID: 0.00515 AU

Physical characteristics
- Mean diameter: 160±30 m
- Sidereal rotation period: 12.3±0.01 h
- Spectral type: D-type or S-type
- Absolute magnitude (H): 20.91 (JPL); 21.4±0.3 (Gherase et al.)

(612267) 2001 SG_{286} is a small, unnamed near-Earth asteroid orbiting in the inner Solar System. Classified as an Apollo asteroid, its orbit crosses Earth's. Like many near-Earth asteroids, it is thought to originate from the main asteroid belt, ejected into the inner Solar System through dynamical interactions with Jupiter and Saturn. Initially classified as a relatively rare D-type asteroid, more recent spectroscopic observations indicate it is instead a stony S-type asteroid. It was discovered on 27 September 2001 by the LINEAR survey at the Lincoln Laboratory's Experimental Test Site near Socorro, New Mexico, United States. It was considered as a sample-return target for the Marco Polo and the MarcoPolo-2D mission concepts, but the proposals were rejected in 2010 and 2015, respectively.

== Orbit ==
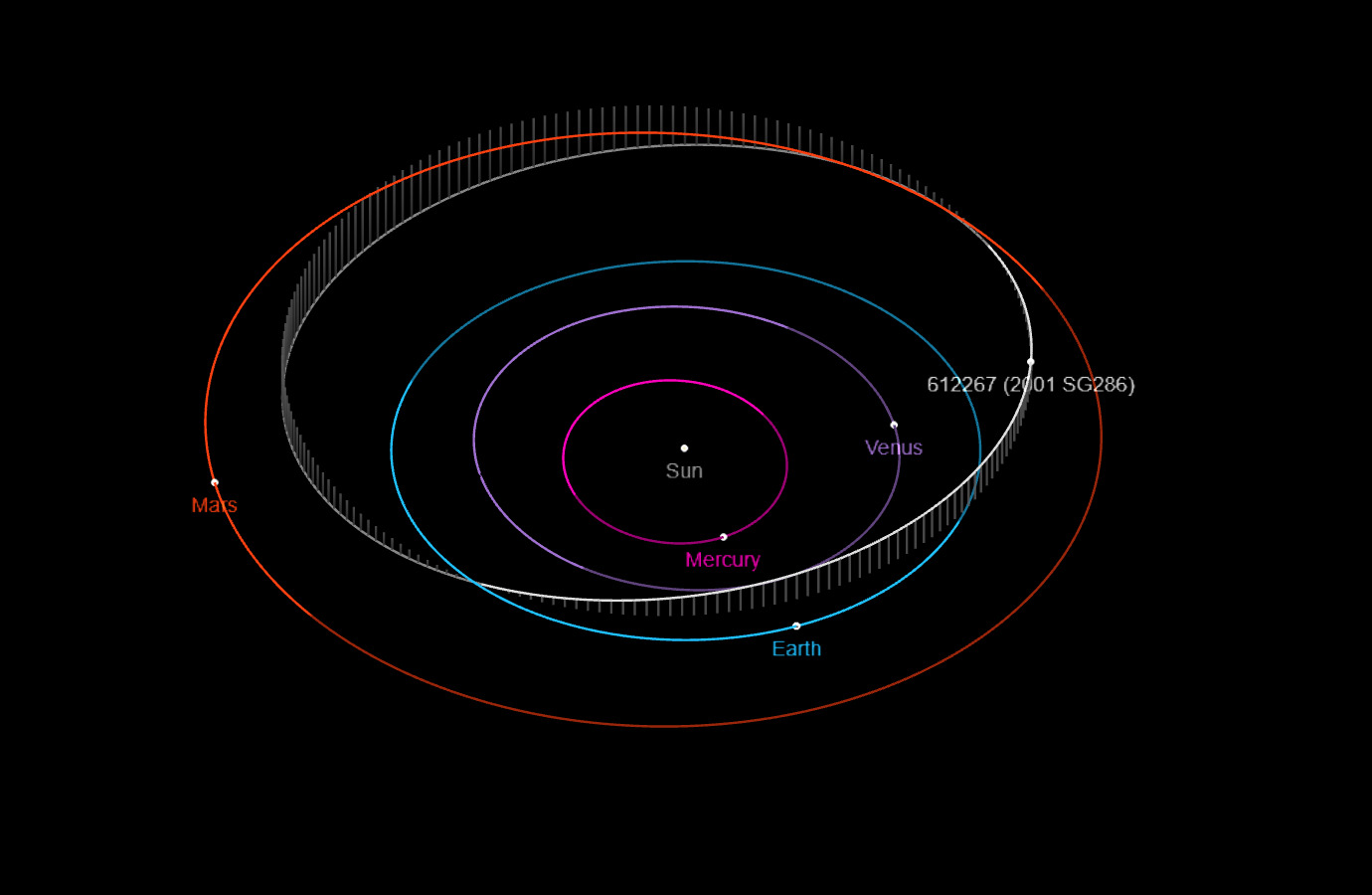
A diagram of 2001 SG_{286}'s orbit, with the orbits of the inner planets shown for comparison.

Orbiting at an average distance of 1.3583 astronomical units (AU) from the Sun, 2001 SG_{286} is classified as both an Apollo asteroid and a near-Earth asteroid (NEA). Over the course of its 1.58 years (580 days) long orbit, its distance from the Sun varies from 0.8864 AU at perihelion to 1.8302 AU at aphelion. Its orbit is moderately elliptical, with an orbital eccentricity of 0.3474, and has an orbital inclination of 7.773° with respect to the ecliptic plane.

NEAs are chaotic objects that have mean dynamical lifetimes shorter than the age of the Solar System. Over 10–100 million years (Myr), NEAs are removed through ejection into interstellar space or collisions with the inner planets. NEAs are then likely repopulated by fragments originating from the asteroid belt. Investigations of 2001 SG_{286}'s dynamical history, conducted through numerical integration models, indicate that it most likely originated through the destabilizing $\nu_{\rm 6}$ secular resonance with Saturn in the inner main belt. Another less probable source is through the 3:1 mean-motion resonance with Jupiter, located at about 2.5 AU. 2001 SG_{286}'s spectral type indicates an origin in the outer main belt, but dynamical models fail to reproduce its current position for an outer main belt origin. If 2001 SG_{286} originates from the outer main belt, then its orbit may have been influenced by the Yarkovsky effect until it reached either the $\nu_{\rm 6}$ secular resonance or 3:1 Jovian resonance. In the future, 2001 SG_{286} is likely to eventually collide with the Sun after encounters with the inner planets and interactions with the 3:1 Jovian resonance or both the 4:1 Jovian resonance and the $\nu_{\rm 6}$ secular resonance.

== Physical characteristics ==
2001 SG_{286} was initially classified under the spectral type D within the Bus–DeMeo classification scheme in a 2004 spectroscopic survey in the visible-wavelength range led by astronomer Richard P. Binzel. Using an assumed albedo of 0.09—typical for D-type asteroids—Binzel et al. calculated an estimated diameter of about 350 metres (1,150 ft) for the asteroid. A followup study led by Marcel Popescu reaffirmed 2001 SG_{286}'s D-type classification using observations in both visible and near-infrared wavelengths. However, more accurate observations in 2024 revealed that 2001 SG_{286}'s spectrum is instead consistent with the more common S-type classification, with data from the 1-μm band indicative of an olivine–pyroxene composition. In previous studies, the 1-μm band was hidden by noise, leading to the earlier D-type classification. Using the average S-type albedo of 0.20, 2001 SG_{286}'s estimated diameter was recalculated as 160 metres (520 ft), with an uncertainty of 30 metres (98 ft).

Analysis of 2001 SG_{286}'s lightcurve—variations in its observed brightness as it rotates—shows that it rotates once every 12.3 hours, with an uncertainty of 0.01 hours. This makes 2001 SG_{286} a slow rotator. Its lightcurve has an amplitude of 0.62 mag.

== Exploration ==
2001 SG_{286} serves as an attractive target for a spacecraft mission due to its accessibility—the delta-v budget required to reach it is roughly 5.6 km/s. 2001 SG_{286} was considered as one of several candidate targets for the Marco Polo mission concept, an asteroid sample-return mission studied by the European Space Agency (ESA) under its Cosmic Vision program as a collaboration with JAXA. In early 2010, the advisory body of ESA's Science and Robotic Exploration Directorate rejected the Marco Polo concept. A resubmitted proposal for the Cosmic Vision M4 opportunity, under the name MarcoPolo-2D, selected 2001 SG_{286} as the mission's baseline target. MarcoPolo-2D was proposed as a collaboration between the ESA and the China National Space Administration (CNSA), and would have involved an orbiter and sample-return lander. MarcoPolo-2D was rejected in the first round of competition in 2015, likely due to budgetary concerns.

== See also ==
- 162173 Ryugu – baseline target for the original Marco Polo study; visited by the Hayabusa2 sample-return mission in 2018.
