= EChO =

Proposed space telescope

- Mission type: Astronomy
- Operator: ESA
- Website: sci.esa.int/echo
- Mission duration: 4–5 years

Spacecraft properties
- Launch mass: 2,100 kg (4,600 lb)

Start of mission
- Launch date: 2024
- Rocket: Soyuz STA/Fregat
- Launch site: Kourou ELS
- Contractor: Arianespace

Orbital parameters
- Reference system: Sun–Earth L_{2}
- Regime: Halo or Lissajous
- Epoch: planned

Main telescope
- Type: Cassegrain
- Diameter: 1.4 m (4.6 ft)
- Focal length: 2 m (6.6 ft)
- Collecting area: 14 m^{2} (150 sq ft)
- Wavelengths: from 0.55 μm (orange) to 11μm (long-infrared) (goal: 0.4 to 16 μm)

The Exoplanet Characterisation Observatory (EChO) was a proposed space telescope as part of the Cosmic Vision roadmap of the European Space Agency, and competed with four other missions for the M3 slot in the programme. On 19 February 2014 the PLATO mission was selected in place of the other candidates in the programme, including EChO.

EChO would have been the first dedicated mission to investigate exoplanetary atmospheres, addressing the suitability of those planets for life and placing the Solar System in context. EChO was intended to provide high resolution, multi-wavelength spectroscopic observations. It would have measured the atmospheric composition, temperature and albedo of a representative sample of known exoplanets, constrain models of their internal structure and improve understanding of how planets form and evolve. It would have orbited around the L2 Lagrange point, 1.5 million km from Earth in the anti-sunward direction.

== SPEChO ==
Following PLATO's M3 selection, a proposal to add EChO on the joint Japanese-European SPICA far-infrared telescope emerged. The proposed EChO instrument on SPICA (SPEChO) is a spectrometer covering light wavelengths from 5 to 20 micrometres, and will observe exoplanet atmospheres utilizing transit spectroscopy. As long with a potential to recover the original scientific goals from EChO, SPEChO will enable SPICA to conduct specialized exoplanetary science studies. SPEChO may also be useful for the science case of galaxies.

However SPEChO's capabilities overlap with the James Webb Space Telescope's MIRI (Mid-Infrared Instrument), therefore SPEChO's advantages over other instruments has become a focus of whether or not to include it on SPICA.

== Other M3 mission candidates ==
- MarcoPolo-R
- LOFT
- STE-QUEST
