= Marco Polo (spacecraft) =

Proposed spacecraft

Marco Polo was a proposed space mission concept studied between 2005 and 2015 that would return a sample of material to Earth from the surface of a near-Earth asteroid (NEA) for detailed study in laboratories. It was first proposed to the European Space Agency in collaboration with the Japan aerospace exploration agency JAXA. The concept was rejected four times between 2007 and 2015 for the Cosmic Vision programme "M" medium-class missions.

== Overview ==
Marco Polo was a mission concept aimed at visiting a small asteroid and returning a sample to Earth for analysis in laboratory. The concept was initially studied by the European Space Agency (ESA) in collaboration with the Japan Aerospace eXploration Agency JAXA, that referred to it as Hayabusa Mk2. Marco Polo was first rejected in June 2007 for the Cosmic Vision program, but was selected for further assessment studies in November 2007.

The in-situ investigation and sample analysis would allow to improve knowledge of the physical and chemical properties of a small near-Earth object (NEO) which is believed to have kept the original composition of the solar nebula in which planets formed. Thus, it would provide some constraints to the models of planet formation and some information on how life ingredients may have been brought to Earth. Information on the physical structure would help defining efficient mitigation strategies against a potential threatening object.

Small bodies, as primitive leftover building blocks of the Solar System formation process, offer clues to the chemical mixture from which the planets formed some 4.6 billion years ago. Current exobiological scenarios for the origin of life invoke an exogenous delivery of organic compounds to the early Earth. It has been proposed that carbonaceous chondrite matter (in the form of planetesimals or dust) could have brought these complex organic molecules capable of triggering the pre-biotic synthesis of biochemical compounds on the early Earth. Moreover, collisions of NEOs with Earth pose a finite hazard to life. For all these reasons, the exploration of such objects is particularly interesting and urgent.

The Marco Polo proposals were supported by more than 400 scientists worldwide. This concept was in competition for the M1, M2, M3 and M4 missions. It was rejected all four times.

== Primary objective ==
The principal scientific objective of the Marco Polo mission is to return unaltered materials from a Near-Earth object (NEO) for analyses in terrestrial laboratories, and to obtain measurements that cannot yet be performed from a robotic spacecraft:

1. Morphological surface properties
2. Environment conditions (e.g. dust, gravity field)
3. Mass, volume and bulk density
4. Mineralogical composition
5. Surface (and possibly subsurface) mineralogy and thermophysical properties (thermal inertia, conductivity, diffusivity, cohesion of the materials)
6. Surface elemental composition and distribution
7. Overall internal structure properties
8. Global topography
9. Volatile abundance
10. Search for organic compounds

=== Additional objectives ===
The mission would allow to:

- Determine the physical and chemical properties of the target body, which are representative of the building blocks of the terrestrial planets.
- Identify the major events (e.g. agglomeration, heating, aqueous alteration, solar wind interactions ...) which influenced the history of the target.
- Determine the elemental and mineralogical properties of the target body and their variations with geological context on the surface.
- Search for pre-solar material yet unknown in meteoritic samples.
- Investigate the nature and origin of organic compounds on the target body.
- Understand the role of minor body impacts in the origin and evolution of life on Earth.

== MarcoPolo-R and MarcoPolo-2D ==
Marco Polo's first two rejections came in the competitions for the European Space Agency's Cosmic Vision program M1 and M2 missions, which were supposed to be launched in 2018 and 2020, respectively. MarcoPolo-R, as it was then renamed and re-submitted, then lost out in the M3 competition in 2014. The mission was then renamed and re-submitted as MarcoPolo-2D to compete for the M4 opportunity, but it was rejected in March 2015 at the first stage of the competition.

A baseline mission scenario to asteroid 162173 Ryugu included a launch with a Soyuz-type launcher of a Mother Spacecraft (MSC) possibly carrying a lander, a sampling device, a re-entry capsule and scientific payloads. The lander would perform a soft landing, anchor to the asteroid surface, and make various in situ measurements of surface/subsurface materials near the sampling site. Samples would be collected with either one or complementary techniques. Once the sampling and in-situ measurements are completed, the MSC would start the return journey towards Earth and would release the capsule for the high-speed re-entry into Earth's atmosphere. After appropriate space quarantine and sterilization processes, samples would be taken out of the capsule in a dedicated sample curation facility to conduct initial sample characterization, prior to their distribution to designated scientists for detailed analyses.

== Proposed targets ==
Some proposed targets of the Marco Polo concept were:

- C-type asteroids 162173 Ryugu and (65679) 1989 UQ
- primitive asteroids type D (612267) 2001 SG_{286} and type T 2001 SK_{162}
- (341843) 2008 EV_{5}
- dormant comet 4015 Wilson–Harrington (1979 VA), which can provide insights on the unknown link between asteroids and comets
- The primitive C-type binary asteroid 1996 FG3, which can provide insight into binary formation processes

== Proposed payload ==
The scientific payloads would include a high resolution imaging system, visible and infrared and mid spectrometers, a LIDAR, and a dust monitor. These instruments would be operated during the approach, hovering and descent phases for science purpose, for landing site selection and for spacecraft safety during near-surface manoeuvres. The Lander would have its own payload for the characterization of the in situ measurements (e.g., close-up camera, panoramic camera, electron microscope, X-ray diffractometer, volatile detector, microbalance, mass spectrometer). Instruments on the lander would be operated in-situ through automatic or Earth commanded sequences. These instruments would also allow to characterize location and surface environment on site of the sampling.

== See also ==
- EChO
- LOFT
- Near-Earth object
- 4015 Wilson–Harrington
