= Arcus (satellite) =

Proposed X-ray space observatory by NASA

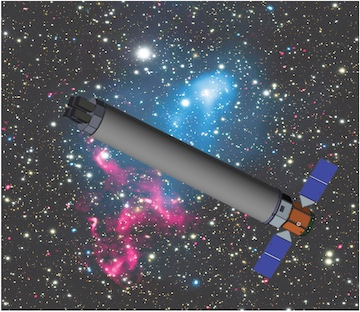
- Artist concept of the Arcus satellite on orbit.
- Mission type: X-ray space observatory
- Operator: NASA
- Website: www.arcusxray.org
- Mission duration: 2–5 years (proposed)

Spacecraft properties
- Bus: LEOStar-2 S/C
- Manufacturer: Orbital ATK
- BOL mass: ≈1,142 kg (2,518 lb)
- Power: 405 W

Start of mission
- Launch date: 2023 (proposed)

Main telescope
- Focal length: 12 m (39 ft)
- Collecting area: 500 cm^{2} (78 sq in)
- Wavelengths: X-ray

Arcus is a proposed X-ray space observatory proposed to NASA's Explorer program, Medium Explorer (MIDEX) class.

The Arcus mission would study galaxies and galaxy clusters using high-resolution X-ray spectroscopy to characterize the interactions between these objects and the diffuse hot gas that permeates them. The Principal investigator is Randall Smith at the Smithsonian Astrophysical Observatory in Cambridge, Massachusetts; the project has significant contributions from the Massachusetts Institute of Technology, cosine Measurement Systems (Sassenheim, Netherlands), Penn State, and the Max Planck Institute for Extraterrestrial Physics.

== Overview ==
Arcus's spectrograph was originally intended to fly on the cancelled International X-ray Observatory (IXO). After the 2011 cancellation, Arcus was proposed as a mission in 2014 to the Small Explorer program (SMEX) but it was not selected for development. After numerous technological advances, Arcus was again proposed to NASA in 2016 to the Medium Explorer program (MIDEX) and was awarded $2 million to refine their mission concept (Phase A study) over nine months. If selected, it would have been funded $250 million for development.

Arcus is an X-ray grating spectrometer space observatory that combines X-ray optics and gratings to disperse the X-rays, much like how a prism separates sunlight into the colors of the rainbow. It would observe astrophysical phenomena in X-ray band over a broad target size range. Its mission includes investigations on the composition of cosmic dust grains, stellar evolution, identify the launching mechanisms of supermassive black hole winds, and structure formation of galaxy clusters. Using new technologies, it offers a resolution improvement of ten times better than existing X-ray observatories.

The space observatory would orbit Earth in a 4:1 lunar resonance, which would allow significant stability for minimal propellant consumption, which could extend the mission life to about 10 years.

Arcus competed as a selection for the next Medium-Class Explorers mission, which took place between Arcus and SPHEREx. If selected, it would have launched in 2023. In February 2019, SPHEREx defeated Arcus to be selected as the next Medium-Class Explorers mission.
