= STE-QUEST =

Proposed ESA mission

Space-Time Explorer and Quantum Equivalence Principle Space Test (STE-QUEST) was a proposed satellite mission to test the Einstein Equivalence Principle to high precision and search for new fundamental constituents and interactions in the Universe. It was supposed to contain an atom interferometer.

It was selected in 2011 for an initial assessment phase as one of the five candidates of the European Space Agency's Cosmic Vision program.

On February 19, 2014, the PLATO mission was selected in favour of the other candidates in the programme, including STE-QUEST.
