= PLATO (spacecraft) =

European space telescope to detect exoplanets

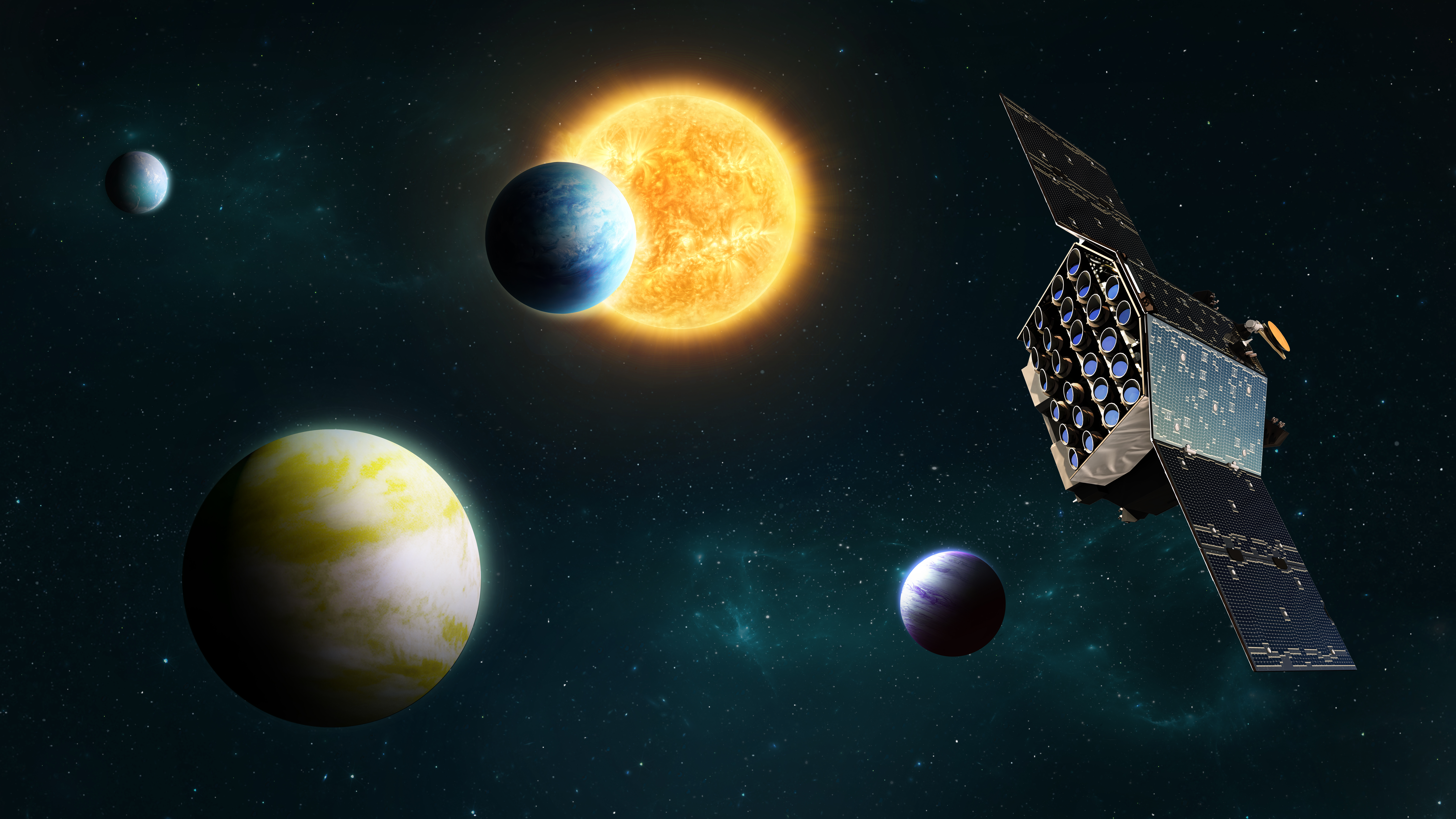
- Artist's impression of the PLATO mission
- Mission type: Space observatory
- Operator: ESA
- Website: platomission.com
- Mission duration: 4 years (plus 4 years of possible mission extensions)

Spacecraft properties
- Manufacturer: OHB System AG
- Launch mass: 2,134 kg (4,705 lb) including 103 kg of propellant
- Payload mass: 533 kg (1,175 lb)
- Power: 1,950 W

Start of mission
- Launch date: Aprìl 2027
- Rocket: Ariane 62
- Launch site: Kourou ELA-4
- Contractor: Arianespace

Orbital parameters
- Reference system: Sun–Earth L_{2}

Main telescope
- Type: Multiple refractors
- Diameter: 26 telescopes, 120 mm each
- Collecting area: 2,250 deg^{2}
- Wavelengths: Visible spectrum: 500 to 1,000 nm
- ESA insignia Cosmic Vision (Science Programme)

PLAnetary Transits and Oscillations of stars (PLATO) is a space telescope under development by the European Space Agency for launch in April 2027. It is the third medium-class mission in ESA's Cosmic Vision programme and is named after the influential Greek philosopher Plato.

The mission goals are to search for planetary transits across up to one million stars, and to discover and characterize rocky extrasolar planets around yellow dwarf stars (like the Sun), subgiant stars, and red dwarf stars. The emphasis of the mission is on Earth-like planets in the habitable zone around Sun-like stars where water can exist in a liquid state. A secondary objective of the mission is to study stellar oscillations or seismic activity in stars to measure stellar masses and evolution and enable the precise characterisation of the planet host star, including its age.

== Name ==
PLATO is an acronym, but also the name of a philosopher in Classical Greece; Plato (428–348 BC) was looking for a physical law accounting for the orbit of planets (errant stars) and able to satisfy the philosopher's needs for "uniformity" and "regularity".

== Background ==
The PLATO Mission Consortium (PMC), led by Prof. Heike Rauer at the German Aerospace Center (DLR) Institute of Planetary Research, is responsible for part of the payload and major contributions to the science operations. The cameras are built by an international team from Italy, Switzerland and Sweden and coordinated by Isabella Pagano at INAF (Istituto Nazionale di Astrofisica) and the payload main electronics was contributed by a Spanish team. The Telescope Optical Unit development is funded by the Italian Space Agency, the Swiss Space Office and the Swedish National Space Board. The PMC Science Management (PSM), composed of more than 500 experts, is coordinated by Prof. Don Pollacco of the University of Warwick and provides expertise for:

- The preparation of the PLATO Input Catalogue (PIC)
- Identifying the optimal fields for PLATO to observe
- Coordinating follow-up observations
- Scientifically validating PLATO's data products

== Objective ==
The objective is the detection of terrestrial exoplanets up to the habitable zone of solar-type stars and the characterization of their bulk properties needed to determine their habitability. To achieve this objective, the mission has these goals:

- Discover and characterize many nearby exoplanetary systems, with precision in the determination of the planets' radii of up to 3%, stellar age of up to 10%, and planet mass of up to 10% (the latter in combination with on-ground radial velocity measurements)
- Detect and characterize Earth-sized planets and super-Earths in the habitable zone around solar-type stars
- Discover and characterize many exoplanetary systems to study their typical architectures, and dependencies on the properties of their host stars and the environment
- Measure stellar oscillations to study the internal structure of stars and how it evolves with age
- Identify good targets for spectroscopic measurements to investigate exoplanet atmospheres

PLATO will differ from the CoRoT, TESS, CHEOPS, and Kepler space telescopes in that it will study relatively bright stars (between magnitudes 4 and 11), enabling a more accurate determination of planetary parameters, and making it easier to confirm planets and measure their masses using follow-up radial velocity measurements on ground-based telescopes. Its dwell time will be longer than that of the TESS NASA mission, making it sensitive to longer-period planets.

== Design ==
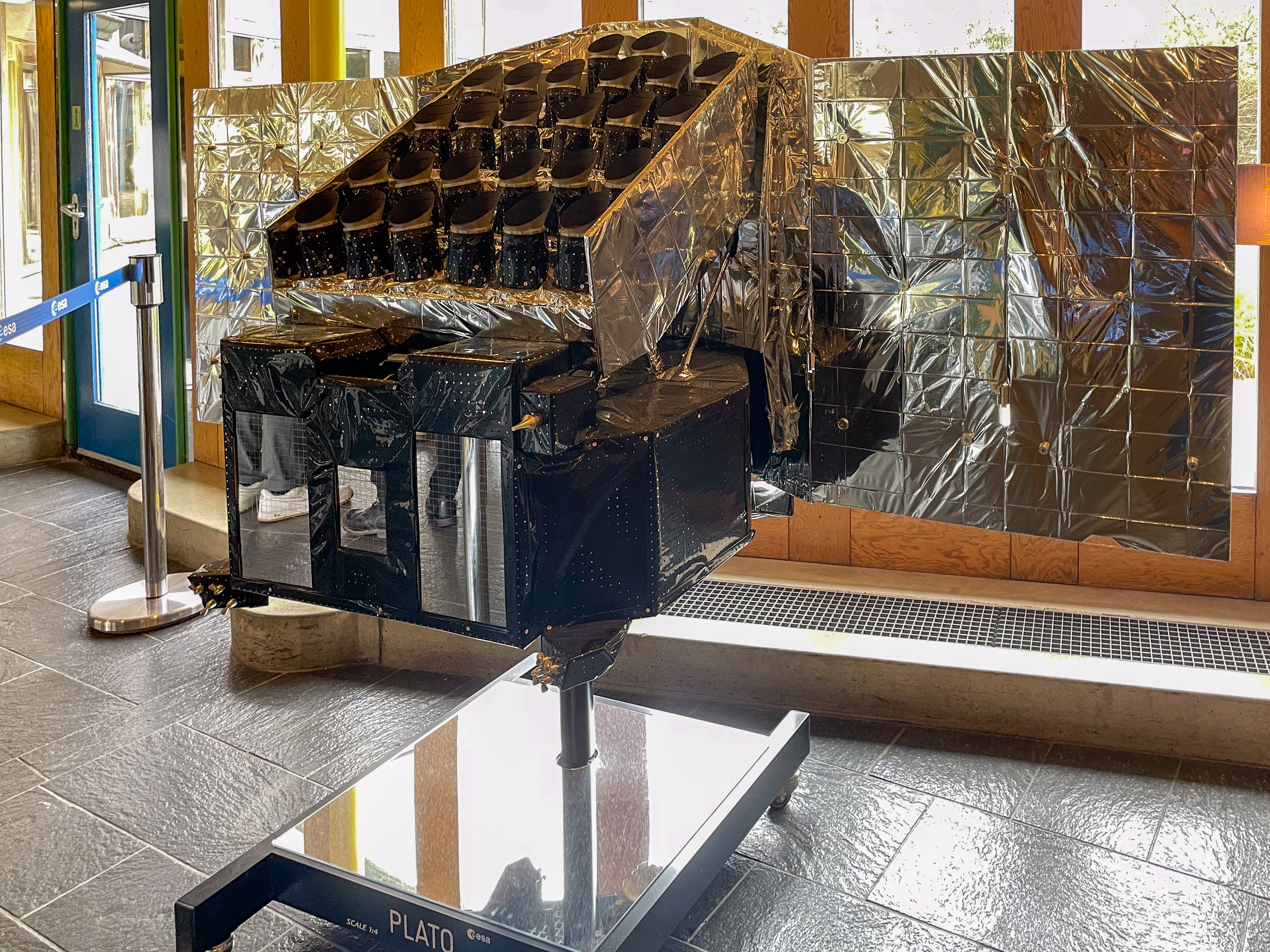
Model of PLATO

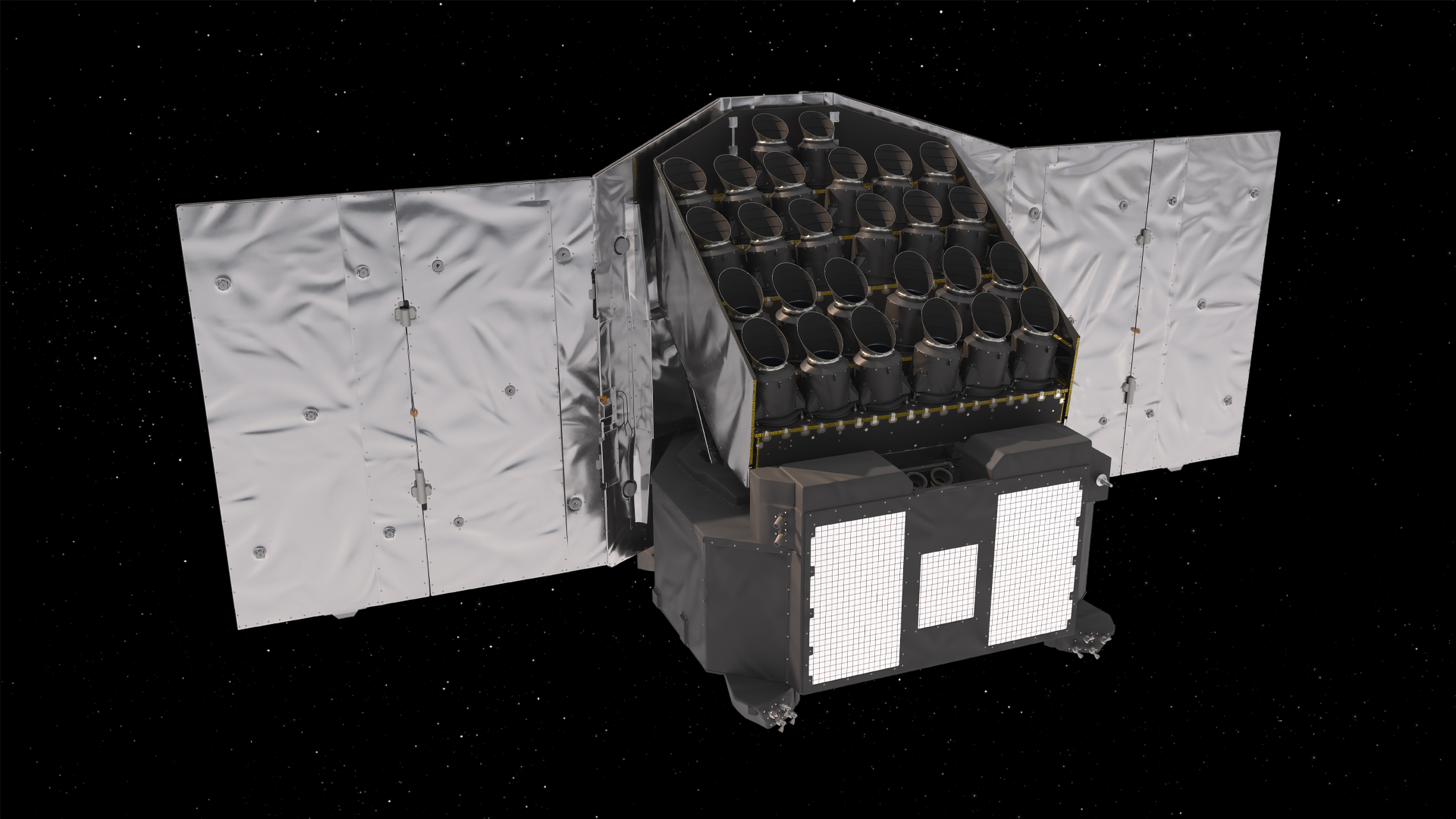
Artist's impression of PLATO

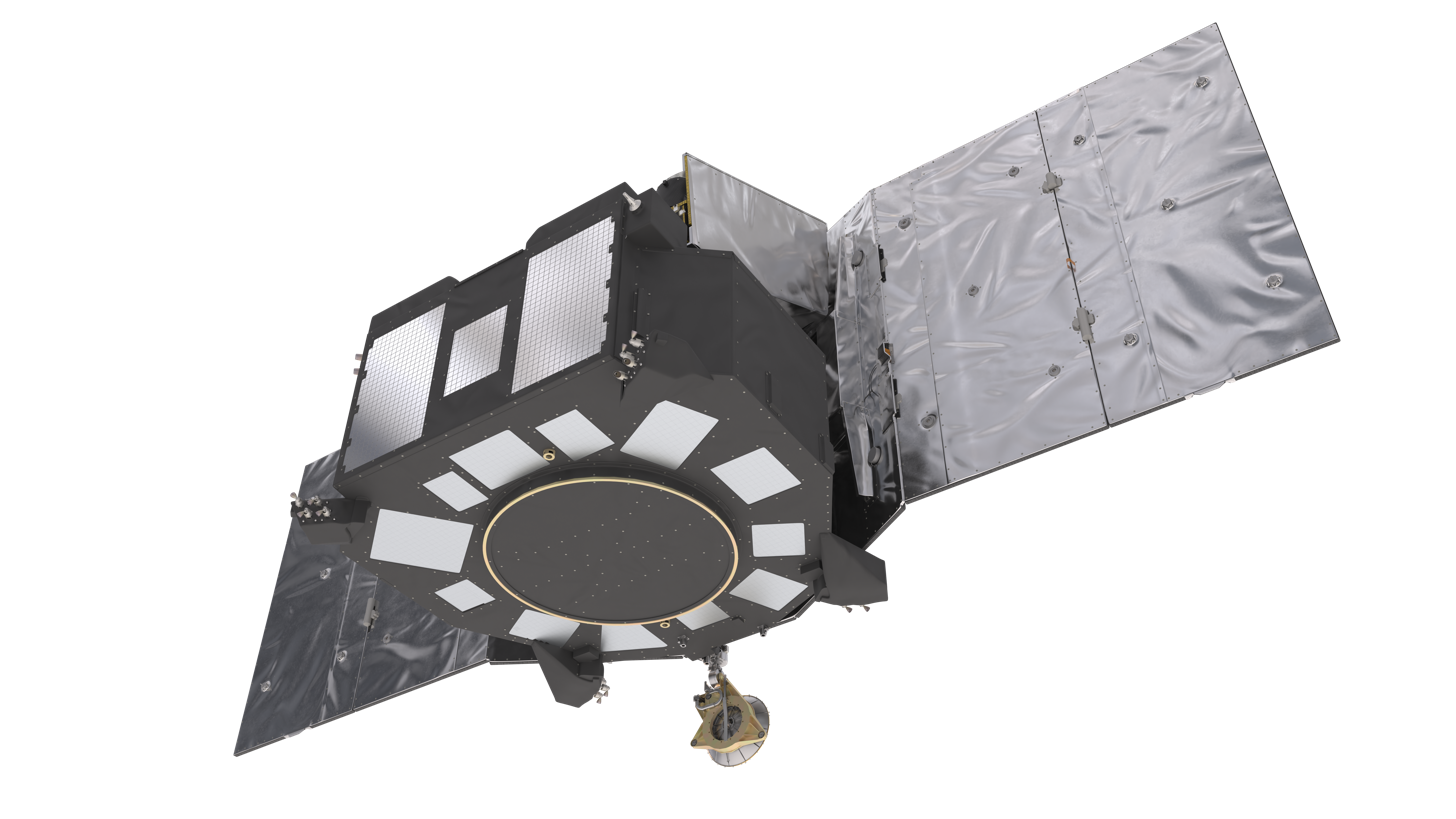
Artist's impression of PLATO, view from below

=== Optics ===
The PLATO payload is based on a multi-telescope approach, involving 26 cameras in total: 24 "normal" cameras organized in 4 groups, and 2 "fast" cameras for bright stars. The 24 "normal" cameras work at a readout cadence of 25 seconds and monitor stars fainter than apparent magnitude 8. The two "fast" cameras work at a cadence of 2.5 seconds to observe stars between magnitude 4 to 8. The cameras are refracting telescopes using six lenses; each camera has a 1,100 deg^{2} field and a 120 mm lens diameter. Each camera is equipped with its own CCD staring array, consisting of four CCDs of 4510 x 4510 pixels.

The 24 "normal cameras" will be arranged in four groups of six cameras with their lines of sight offset by a 9.2° angle from the +ZPLM axis. This particular configuration allows surveying an instantaneous field of view of about 2,250 deg^{2} per pointing. The space observatory will rotate around the mean line of sight once per year, delivering a continuous survey of the same region of the sky.

== Data release schedule ==
The public release of photometric data (including light curves) and high-level science products for each quarter will be made after six months and by one year after the end of their validation period. The data are processed by quarters because this is the duration between each 90-degree rotation of the spacecraft. For the first quarter of observations, six months are required for data validation and pipeline updates. For the next quarters, three months will be needed.

A small number of stars (no more than 2,000 stars out of 250,000) will have proprietary status, meaning the data will only be accessible to the Plato Mission Consortium members for a given time period. They will be selected using the first three months of Plato observations for each field. The proprietary period is limited to 6 months after the completion of the ground-based observations or the end of the mission archival phase (Launch date + 7.5 years), whichever comes first.

== Project timeline ==
=== Development ===
- PLATO was first proposed in 2007 to the European Space Agency (ESA) by a team of scientists in response to the call for ESA's Cosmic Vision 2015–2025 programme.
- The assessment phase was completed during 2009, and in May 2010 it entered the Definition Phase.
- Following a call for missions in July 2010, ESA selected in February 2011 four candidates for a medium-class mission (M3 mission) for a launch opportunity in 2024.
- PLATO was announced on 19 February 2014 as the selected M3 class science mission for implementation as part of its Cosmic Vision Programme. Other competing concepts that were studied included the four candidate missions EChO, LOFT, MarcoPolo-R and STE-QUEST.
- In January 2015, ESA selected Thales Alenia Space, Airbus DS, and OHB System AG to conduct three parallel phase B1 studies to define the system and subsystem aspects of Plato, which were completed in 2016.
- On 20 June 2017, ESA adopted PLATO in the Science Programme, which means that the mission can move from a blueprint into construction. Over the coming months, industry was asked to make bids to supply the spacecraft platform.
- In October 2018, ESA signed a contract with OHB System AG to lead the construction of PLATO.
- In January 2022, PLATO passed a critical milestone review and has been given the green light to continue with its development.

=== Construction ===
- From May to August 2023, a structural model of PLATO underwent a test campaign at ESTEC Test Centre in Noordwijk to check if it can withstand the loads of the launch.
- In June 2024, the integration of PLATO's cameras started at OHB facility in Oberpfaffenhofen.
- In September 2024, UCL's Mullard Space Science Laboratory delivered the read-out electronics for PLATO's cameras to the Liege space centre in Belgium.
- In January 2025, ESA and Arianespace signed the launch agreement to fly PLATO on Ariane 6.
- In April 2025, ESOC's Ground Segment Reference Facility (GSRF) performed a series of radio tests to make sure that PLATO's communication system is capable of interacting with the ESA’s ESTRACK deep space antennas.
- In May 2025, ESA announced that 24 of the 26 cameras have been installed at OHB. The remaining two are the "fast" cameras that will monitor the brightest stars and contribute to controlling the spacecraft's pointing.
- On 11 June 2025, PLATO's payload module, now including all 26 cameras, was connected to the service module.
- On 1 September 2025, PLATO arrived at ESTEC in the Netherlands. It was transported from Oberpfaffenhofen via the Rhine River by the VAARWEL cargo vessel.
- On 9 September 2025, PLATO has been completed at ESTEC by installation of the combined sunshield and solar array module. Later in September, engineers tested the deployment and energy generation of the solar array wings.

=== Testing ===
- In January 2026, PLATO successfully passed vibration and acoustic tests at ESTEC.
- On 18 February 2026, PLATO was placed in the Large Space Simulator (LSS) for environmental testing, which started in early March 2026.
- In April 2026, PLATO successfully completed its tests in LSS.
- In July 2026, PLATO successfully completed its electronics-focused tests inside the Maxwell Test Chamber at ESTEC.

=== Launch ===
PLATO is scheduled to be launched on April 20, 2027 from Europe's Spaceport in French Guiana on an Ariane 62 to the Sun–Earth L_{2} Lagrange point.

== See also ==
- List of European Space Agency programmes and missions
- Cosmic Vision, ESA program (2015–2025)
- List of projects of the European Space Agency
- List of space telescopes
- CHEOPS, a European space telescope to determine the size of known extrasolar planets, launched in 2019
- Transiting Exoplanet Survey Satellite (TESS), NASA, launched in 2018, with a similar multi-camera design
- PLATOSpec – Astronomical instrument
