= List of minor planets: 451001–452000 =

The following is a partial list of minor planets, running from minor-planet number 451001 through 452000, inclusive. The primary data for this and other partial lists is based on JPL's "Small-Body Orbital Elements" and data available from the Minor Planet Center. Critical list information is also provided by the MPC, unless otherwise specified from Lowell Observatory. A detailed description of the table's columns and additional sources are given on the main page including a complete list of every page in this series, and a statistical break-up on the dynamical classification of minor planets.

Also see the summary list of all named bodies in numerical and alphabetical order, and the corresponding naming citations for the number range of this particular list. New namings may only be added to this list after official publication, as the preannouncement of names is condemned by the Working Group for Small Bodies Nomenclature of the International Astronomical Union.

Near-Earth obj.	MBA (inner)	MBA (outer)	Centaur
Mars-crosser	MBA (middle)	Jupiter trojan	Trans-Neptunian obj.
Unclassified

== 451001–451100 ==
Designation			Discovery			Properties		Ref
Permanent	Provisional	Named after	Date	Site	Discoverer(s)	Category	Diam.	Ref
451001	2008 TK_{134}	—	October 8, 2008	Kitt Peak	Spacewatch	·	590 m	MPC · JPL
451002	2008 TU_{188}	—	October 10, 2008	Mount Lemmon	Mount Lemmon Survey	·	770 m	MPC · JPL
451003	2008 UD_{1}	—	October 21, 2008	Mount Lemmon	Mount Lemmon Survey	APO	450 m	MPC · JPL
451004	2008 US_{25}	—	September 9, 2008	Mount Lemmon	Mount Lemmon Survey	V	510 m	MPC · JPL
451005	2008 UN_{27}	—	October 20, 2008	Kitt Peak	Spacewatch	MAS	680 m	MPC · JPL
451006	2008 UX_{46}	—	October 20, 2008	Kitt Peak	Spacewatch	·	980 m	MPC · JPL
451007	2008 UE_{53}	—	October 20, 2008	Kitt Peak	Spacewatch	·	590 m	MPC · JPL
451008	2008 UX_{55}	—	October 21, 2008	Kitt Peak	Spacewatch	·	610 m	MPC · JPL
451009	2008 UA_{61}	—	September 28, 2008	Mount Lemmon	Mount Lemmon Survey	·	1 km	MPC · JPL
451010	2008 UR_{76}	—	October 21, 2008	Kitt Peak	Spacewatch	·	560 m	MPC · JPL
451011	2008 UO_{83}	—	October 22, 2008	Kitt Peak	Spacewatch	·	900 m	MPC · JPL
451012	2008 UK_{98}	—	October 26, 2008	Socorro	LINEAR	PHO	1.2 km	MPC · JPL
451013	2008 UK_{131}	—	October 23, 2008	Kitt Peak	Spacewatch	·	800 m	MPC · JPL
451014	2008 UG_{136}	—	October 23, 2008	Kitt Peak	Spacewatch	(2076)	810 m	MPC · JPL
451015	2008 UK_{179}	—	October 24, 2008	Kitt Peak	Spacewatch	·	670 m	MPC · JPL
451016	2008 UN_{184}	—	October 24, 2008	Kitt Peak	Spacewatch	·	840 m	MPC · JPL
451017	2008 UR_{228}	—	October 25, 2008	Kitt Peak	Spacewatch	·	1.3 km	MPC · JPL
451018	2008 UP_{240}	—	October 26, 2008	Kitt Peak	Spacewatch	V	520 m	MPC · JPL
451019	2008 UX_{268}	—	October 28, 2008	Kitt Peak	Spacewatch	·	690 m	MPC · JPL
451020	2008 UY_{275}	—	October 20, 2008	Kitt Peak	Spacewatch	·	520 m	MPC · JPL
451021	2008 UH_{365}	—	October 24, 2008	Catalina	CSS	PHO	810 m	MPC · JPL
451022	2008 VS_{33}	—	November 2, 2008	Mount Lemmon	Mount Lemmon Survey	·	610 m	MPC · JPL
451023	2008 VN_{39}	—	October 26, 2008	Kitt Peak	Spacewatch	V	680 m	MPC · JPL
451024	2008 VF_{54}	—	November 6, 2008	Kitt Peak	Spacewatch	PHO	870 m	MPC · JPL
451025	2008 WK_{20}	—	November 17, 2008	Kitt Peak	Spacewatch	·	670 m	MPC · JPL
451026	2008 WE_{33}	—	November 6, 2008	Catalina	CSS	·	870 m	MPC · JPL
451027	2008 WF_{50}	—	November 7, 2008	Mount Lemmon	Mount Lemmon Survey	PHO	870 m	MPC · JPL
451028	2008 WY_{70}	—	November 18, 2008	Kitt Peak	Spacewatch	·	840 m	MPC · JPL
451029	2008 WL_{76}	—	November 20, 2008	Kitt Peak	Spacewatch	·	850 m	MPC · JPL
451030	2008 WQ_{80}	—	November 20, 2008	Kitt Peak	Spacewatch	NYS	710 m	MPC · JPL
451031	2008 WH_{100}	—	November 1, 2008	Mount Lemmon	Mount Lemmon Survey	V	720 m	MPC · JPL
451032	2008 WX_{104}	—	September 25, 2008	Mount Lemmon	Mount Lemmon Survey	MAS	840 m	MPC · JPL
451033	2008 WF_{111}	—	November 30, 2008	Kitt Peak	Spacewatch	NYS	1.0 km	MPC · JPL
451034	2008 WO_{114}	—	October 23, 2008	Kitt Peak	Spacewatch	·	1.1 km	MPC · JPL
451035	2008 WT_{116}	—	November 30, 2008	Kitt Peak	Spacewatch	·	740 m	MPC · JPL
451036	2008 WT_{133}	—	November 18, 2008	Catalina	CSS	(2076)	940 m	MPC · JPL
451037	2008 XN_{3}	—	December 2, 2008	Socorro	LINEAR	·	760 m	MPC · JPL
451038	2008 XV_{29}	—	December 1, 2008	Kitt Peak	Spacewatch	·	840 m	MPC · JPL
451039	2008 XO_{46}	—	November 19, 2008	Kitt Peak	Spacewatch	·	870 m	MPC · JPL
451040	2008 XM_{47}	—	December 2, 2008	Kitt Peak	Spacewatch	NYS	700 m	MPC · JPL
451041	2008 XT_{54}	—	December 4, 2008	Socorro	LINEAR	PHO	1.4 km	MPC · JPL
451042	2008 YE	—	November 21, 2008	Mount Lemmon	Mount Lemmon Survey	·	660 m	MPC · JPL
451043	2008 YB_{2}	—	December 19, 2008	Socorro	LINEAR	·	1.3 km	MPC · JPL
451044	2008 YQ_{3}	—	September 29, 2008	Mount Lemmon	Mount Lemmon Survey	·	960 m	MPC · JPL
451045	2008 YV_{9}	—	November 24, 2008	Mount Lemmon	Mount Lemmon Survey	·	1.6 km	MPC · JPL
451046	2008 YR_{12}	—	November 21, 2008	Kitt Peak	Spacewatch	·	900 m	MPC · JPL
451047	2008 YR_{83}	—	December 31, 2008	Kitt Peak	Spacewatch	MAS	700 m	MPC · JPL
451048	2008 YE_{88}	—	December 21, 2008	Kitt Peak	Spacewatch	·	900 m	MPC · JPL
451049	2008 YO_{90}	—	December 29, 2008	Kitt Peak	Spacewatch	·	820 m	MPC · JPL
451050	2008 YL_{93}	—	December 21, 2008	Kitt Peak	Spacewatch	·	1.2 km	MPC · JPL
451051	2008 YP_{102}	—	December 29, 2008	Kitt Peak	Spacewatch	·	900 m	MPC · JPL
451052	2008 YU_{104}	—	November 24, 2008	Mount Lemmon	Mount Lemmon Survey	·	870 m	MPC · JPL
451053	2008 YZ_{107}	—	November 21, 2008	Mount Lemmon	Mount Lemmon Survey	·	930 m	MPC · JPL
451054	2008 YO_{108}	—	December 29, 2008	Kitt Peak	Spacewatch	·	1.1 km	MPC · JPL
451055	2008 YB_{112}	—	December 31, 2008	Kitt Peak	Spacewatch	·	890 m	MPC · JPL
451056	2008 YW_{112}	—	December 31, 2008	Kitt Peak	Spacewatch	3:2	5.3 km	MPC · JPL
451057	2008 YY_{116}	—	November 21, 2008	Mount Lemmon	Mount Lemmon Survey	V	680 m	MPC · JPL
451058	2008 YS_{123}	—	December 30, 2008	Kitt Peak	Spacewatch	·	1.1 km	MPC · JPL
451059	2008 YS_{133}	—	December 30, 2008	La Sagra	OAM	·	1.2 km	MPC · JPL
451060	2008 YK_{151}	—	December 22, 2008	Kitt Peak	Spacewatch	MAS	660 m	MPC · JPL
451061	2008 YM_{155}	—	December 22, 2008	Kitt Peak	Spacewatch	V	680 m	MPC · JPL
451062	2008 YU_{157}	—	December 30, 2008	Mount Lemmon	Mount Lemmon Survey	·	1.3 km	MPC · JPL
451063	2008 YY_{162}	—	December 22, 2008	Mount Lemmon	Mount Lemmon Survey	NYS	1.1 km	MPC · JPL
451064	2008 YC_{166}	—	December 22, 2008	Mount Lemmon	Mount Lemmon Survey	MAS	680 m	MPC · JPL
451065	2009 AJ_{3}	—	October 9, 2004	Kitt Peak	Spacewatch	·	880 m	MPC · JPL
451066	2009 AU_{24}	—	January 3, 2009	Kitt Peak	Spacewatch	·	1.0 km	MPC · JPL
451067	2009 AW_{24}	—	December 22, 2008	Kitt Peak	Spacewatch	ADE	2.0 km	MPC · JPL
451068	2009 AR_{25}	—	January 2, 2009	Kitt Peak	Spacewatch	CLA	1.5 km	MPC · JPL
451069	2009 AL_{33}	—	January 15, 2009	Kitt Peak	Spacewatch	·	1.2 km	MPC · JPL
451070	2009 BZ_{17}	—	January 16, 2009	Kitt Peak	Spacewatch	MAS	520 m	MPC · JPL
451071	2009 BN_{20}	—	December 22, 2008	Kitt Peak	Spacewatch	·	1.1 km	MPC · JPL
451072	2009 BO_{26}	—	December 31, 2008	Mount Lemmon	Mount Lemmon Survey	·	1.3 km	MPC · JPL
451073	2009 BG_{30}	—	December 29, 2008	Kitt Peak	Spacewatch	NYS	1.1 km	MPC · JPL
451074	2009 BV_{31}	—	January 16, 2009	Kitt Peak	Spacewatch	MAS	570 m	MPC · JPL
451075	2009 BE_{35}	—	January 16, 2009	Kitt Peak	Spacewatch	NYS	910 m	MPC · JPL
451076	2009 BG_{39}	—	January 16, 2009	Kitt Peak	Spacewatch	NYS	1.1 km	MPC · JPL
451077	2009 BC_{63}	—	January 20, 2009	Kitt Peak	Spacewatch	·	1.3 km	MPC · JPL
451078	2009 BT_{63}	—	January 20, 2009	Kitt Peak	Spacewatch	H	450 m	MPC · JPL
451079	2009 BF_{70}	—	January 25, 2009	Catalina	CSS	·	870 m	MPC · JPL
451080	2009 BV_{84}	—	January 25, 2009	Kitt Peak	Spacewatch	MAS	630 m	MPC · JPL
451081	2009 BO_{85}	—	January 25, 2009	Kitt Peak	Spacewatch	·	1.1 km	MPC · JPL
451082	2009 BZ_{91}	—	December 29, 2008	Mount Lemmon	Mount Lemmon Survey	·	970 m	MPC · JPL
451083	2009 BR_{100}	—	December 22, 2008	Kitt Peak	Spacewatch	·	1.0 km	MPC · JPL
451084	2009 BU_{106}	—	January 28, 2009	Catalina	CSS	·	1.3 km	MPC · JPL
451085	2009 BW_{115}	—	December 31, 2008	Kitt Peak	Spacewatch	·	950 m	MPC · JPL
451086	2009 BP_{123}	—	January 20, 2009	Kitt Peak	Spacewatch	NYS	970 m	MPC · JPL
451087	2009 BL_{126}	—	December 19, 2004	Mount Lemmon	Mount Lemmon Survey	·	1.0 km	MPC · JPL
451088	2009 BQ_{142}	—	January 30, 2009	Kitt Peak	Spacewatch	·	1.3 km	MPC · JPL
451089	2009 BV_{142}	—	January 30, 2009	Kitt Peak	Spacewatch	·	1.2 km	MPC · JPL
451090	2009 BX_{176}	—	December 9, 2004	Kitt Peak	Spacewatch	·	1 km	MPC · JPL
451091	2009 BH_{177}	—	January 29, 2009	Mount Lemmon	Mount Lemmon Survey	MAR	970 m	MPC · JPL
451092	2009 BC_{186}	—	January 30, 2009	Catalina	CSS	·	1.1 km	MPC · JPL
451093	2009 CA_{5}	—	December 29, 2008	Kitt Peak	Spacewatch	·	1.1 km	MPC · JPL
451094	2009 CL_{21}	—	January 18, 2009	Kitt Peak	Spacewatch	·	1.1 km	MPC · JPL
451095	2009 CS_{22}	—	February 1, 2009	Kitt Peak	Spacewatch	·	1.1 km	MPC · JPL
451096	2009 CR_{27}	—	February 1, 2009	Kitt Peak	Spacewatch	NYS	1.1 km	MPC · JPL
451097	2009 CH_{35}	—	October 2, 2000	Socorro	LINEAR	·	1.4 km	MPC · JPL
451098	2009 CJ_{36}	—	January 20, 2009	Kitt Peak	Spacewatch	·	1.1 km	MPC · JPL
451099	2009 CR_{47}	—	February 14, 2009	Kitt Peak	Spacewatch	·	1.6 km	MPC · JPL
451100	2009 CU_{62}	—	February 13, 2009	Kitt Peak	Spacewatch	MAS	640 m	MPC · JPL

== 451101–451200 ==
back to top

Designation			Discovery			Properties		Ref
Permanent	Provisional	Named after	Date	Site	Discoverer(s)	Category	Diam.	Ref
451101	2009 DR_{16}	—	January 17, 2009	Kitt Peak	Spacewatch	EUN	980 m	MPC · JPL
451102	2009 DX_{51}	—	January 15, 2009	Kitt Peak	Spacewatch	·	1.1 km	MPC · JPL
451103	2009 DN_{63}	—	January 31, 2009	Kitt Peak	Spacewatch	·	970 m	MPC · JPL
451104	2009 DJ_{132}	—	February 27, 2009	Kitt Peak	Spacewatch	WIT	1.1 km	MPC · JPL
451105	2009 EH_{14}	—	March 15, 2009	Kitt Peak	Spacewatch	·	840 m	MPC · JPL
451106	2009 EM_{15}	—	January 17, 2005	Kitt Peak	Spacewatch	·	1.1 km	MPC · JPL
451107	2009 EW_{22}	—	March 3, 2009	Kitt Peak	Spacewatch	·	2.6 km	MPC · JPL
451108	2009 EV_{23}	—	March 15, 2009	Kitt Peak	Spacewatch	·	1.2 km	MPC · JPL
451109	2009 FU_{9}	—	March 17, 2009	Kitt Peak	Spacewatch	·	1.1 km	MPC · JPL
451110	2009 FG_{24}	—	March 20, 2009	La Sagra	OAM	·	2.7 km	MPC · JPL
451111	2009 FG_{41}	—	March 21, 2009	La Sagra	OAM	·	1.0 km	MPC · JPL
451112	2009 FT_{41}	—	March 26, 2009	Mount Lemmon	Mount Lemmon Survey	·	980 m	MPC · JPL
451113	2009 FA_{65}	—	March 17, 2009	Kitt Peak	Spacewatch	·	1.9 km	MPC · JPL
451114	2009 FO_{69}	—	March 17, 2009	Kitt Peak	Spacewatch	MAR	1.2 km	MPC · JPL
451115	2009 FL_{78}	—	March 1, 2009	Catalina	CSS	·	1.8 km	MPC · JPL
451116	2009 GW_{5}	—	April 2, 2009	Kitt Peak	Spacewatch	·	1.6 km	MPC · JPL
451117	2009 HS_{25}	—	March 17, 2009	Kitt Peak	Spacewatch	·	1.5 km	MPC · JPL
451118	2009 HA_{45}	—	April 20, 2009	Kitt Peak	Spacewatch	·	1.4 km	MPC · JPL
451119	2009 HP_{82}	—	April 22, 2009	La Sagra	OAM	H	540 m	MPC · JPL
451120	2009 HU_{93}	—	April 30, 2009	Kitt Peak	Spacewatch	·	1.3 km	MPC · JPL
451121	2009 HW_{102}	—	April 17, 2009	Kitt Peak	Spacewatch	·	1.7 km	MPC · JPL
451122	2009 JE_{6}	—	April 29, 2009	Kitt Peak	Spacewatch	·	1.3 km	MPC · JPL
451123	2009 JZ_{10}	—	May 14, 2009	Kitt Peak	Spacewatch	·	1.8 km	MPC · JPL
451124	2009 KC_{3}	—	May 23, 2009	Siding Spring	SSS	T_{j} (2.73) · APO +1km · PHA · critical	2.2 km	MPC · JPL
451125	2009 KB_{7}	—	May 25, 2009	Tiki	Teamo, N.	·	2.7 km	MPC · JPL
451126	2009 KU_{13}	—	May 25, 2009	Kitt Peak	Spacewatch	H	520 m	MPC · JPL
451127	2009 KK_{28}	—	May 1, 2009	Mount Lemmon	Mount Lemmon Survey	·	1.1 km	MPC · JPL
451128	2009 LN_{5}	—	September 19, 2001	Socorro	LINEAR	·	2.0 km	MPC · JPL
451129	2009 MU_{9}	—	June 23, 2009	Mount Lemmon	Mount Lemmon Survey	·	2.2 km	MPC · JPL
451130	2009 NB	—	July 2, 2009	La Sagra	OAM	·	3.2 km	MPC · JPL
451131	2009 OR_{18}	—	July 28, 2009	Kitt Peak	Spacewatch	·	2.0 km	MPC · JPL
451132	2009 PR_{2}	—	July 27, 2009	Catalina	CSS	·	4.6 km	MPC · JPL
451133	2009 PW_{11}	—	August 15, 2009	Catalina	CSS	·	3.4 km	MPC · JPL
451134	2009 QV_{2}	—	August 16, 2009	Kitt Peak	Spacewatch	·	2.2 km	MPC · JPL
451135	2009 QS_{28}	—	August 23, 2009	Bisei SG Center	BATTeRS	·	4.0 km	MPC · JPL
451136	2009 QH_{30}	—	August 21, 2009	Socorro	LINEAR	·	2.9 km	MPC · JPL
451137	2009 QJ_{31}	—	August 20, 2009	La Sagra	OAM	·	2.3 km	MPC · JPL
451138 Rizvanov	2009 QC_{37}	Rizvanov	August 29, 2009	Zelenchukskaya Stn112435	T. V. Krjačko	EOS	2.0 km	MPC · JPL
451139	2009 QN_{37}	—	August 15, 2009	Kitt Peak	Spacewatch	·	2.8 km	MPC · JPL
451140	2009 QP_{54}	—	August 27, 2009	Kitt Peak	Spacewatch	·	2.0 km	MPC · JPL
451141	2009 QZ_{55}	—	August 29, 2009	Kitt Peak	Spacewatch	·	2.3 km	MPC · JPL
451142	2009 QY_{58}	—	August 31, 2009	Siding Spring	SSS	·	3.9 km	MPC · JPL
451143	2009 QB_{60}	—	August 16, 2009	Catalina	CSS	·	3.7 km	MPC · JPL
451144	2009 QN_{61}	—	September 21, 2009	Catalina	CSS	·	4.1 km	MPC · JPL
451145	2009 QA_{63}	—	August 28, 2009	Kitt Peak	Spacewatch	·	2.0 km	MPC · JPL
451146	2009 QZ_{63}	—	August 17, 2009	Catalina	CSS	·	2.4 km	MPC · JPL
451147	2009 RR_{12}	—	September 12, 2009	Kitt Peak	Spacewatch	·	3.3 km	MPC · JPL
451148	2009 RJ_{16}	—	September 12, 2009	Kitt Peak	Spacewatch	·	3.4 km	MPC · JPL
451149	2009 RL_{17}	—	September 12, 2009	Kitt Peak	Spacewatch	·	3.0 km	MPC · JPL
451150	2009 RK_{40}	—	September 15, 2009	Kitt Peak	Spacewatch	EOS	1.8 km	MPC · JPL
451151	2009 SR_{10}	—	September 16, 2009	Kitt Peak	Spacewatch	THM	3.2 km	MPC · JPL
451152	2009 SC_{23}	—	August 23, 2004	Kitt Peak	Spacewatch	·	1.7 km	MPC · JPL
451153	2009 SC_{27}	—	September 16, 2009	Kitt Peak	Spacewatch	·	2.3 km	MPC · JPL
451154	2009 SZ_{30}	—	September 16, 2009	Kitt Peak	Spacewatch	EOS	2.0 km	MPC · JPL
451155	2009 SS_{76}	—	September 17, 2009	Kitt Peak	Spacewatch	·	2.6 km	MPC · JPL
451156	2009 SL_{85}	—	August 27, 2009	Kitt Peak	Spacewatch	·	1.5 km	MPC · JPL
451157	2009 SQ_{104}	—	September 26, 2009	Mount Lemmon	Mount Lemmon Survey	APO · PHA	210 m	MPC · JPL
451158	2009 SD_{111}	—	September 18, 2009	Kitt Peak	Spacewatch	·	3.2 km	MPC · JPL
451159	2009 SM_{114}	—	September 18, 2009	Kitt Peak	Spacewatch	·	2.5 km	MPC · JPL
451160	2009 SU_{119}	—	January 6, 2006	Catalina	CSS	·	4.0 km	MPC · JPL
451161	2009 SM_{135}	—	September 18, 2009	Kitt Peak	Spacewatch	·	4.1 km	MPC · JPL
451162	2009 SN_{138}	—	September 18, 2009	Kitt Peak	Spacewatch	·	2.3 km	MPC · JPL
451163	2009 SX_{146}	—	September 19, 2009	Kitt Peak	Spacewatch	·	4.7 km	MPC · JPL
451164	2009 SE_{154}	—	September 20, 2009	Kitt Peak	Spacewatch	·	2.5 km	MPC · JPL
451165	2009 SX_{162}	—	November 20, 2004	Kitt Peak	Spacewatch	·	3.6 km	MPC · JPL
451166	2009 SJ_{163}	—	September 21, 2009	Mount Lemmon	Mount Lemmon Survey	·	2.6 km	MPC · JPL
451167	2009 SY_{182}	—	September 21, 2009	Mount Lemmon	Mount Lemmon Survey	EOS	1.6 km	MPC · JPL
451168	2009 SP_{213}	—	September 15, 2009	Kitt Peak	Spacewatch	·	2.7 km	MPC · JPL
451169	2009 SO_{215}	—	September 24, 2009	Kitt Peak	Spacewatch	·	2.5 km	MPC · JPL
451170	2009 SD_{218}	—	September 24, 2009	Kitt Peak	Spacewatch	·	2.2 km	MPC · JPL
451171	2009 SR_{235}	—	September 17, 2009	Kitt Peak	Spacewatch	·	2.1 km	MPC · JPL
451172	2009 SY_{252}	—	September 22, 2009	Kitt Peak	Spacewatch	·	2.8 km	MPC · JPL
451173	2009 SB_{258}	—	September 21, 2009	Mount Lemmon	Mount Lemmon Survey	·	2.1 km	MPC · JPL
451174	2009 SL_{268}	—	September 24, 2009	Kitt Peak	Spacewatch	·	2.4 km	MPC · JPL
451175	2009 SK_{269}	—	September 12, 2009	Kitt Peak	Spacewatch	THM	1.9 km	MPC · JPL
451176	2009 SK_{270}	—	September 24, 2009	Mount Lemmon	Mount Lemmon Survey	·	2.6 km	MPC · JPL
451177	2009 SX_{277}	—	September 25, 2009	Kitt Peak	Spacewatch	·	2.2 km	MPC · JPL
451178	2009 SD_{286}	—	August 27, 2009	Kitt Peak	Spacewatch	THM	1.6 km	MPC · JPL
451179	2009 SZ_{288}	—	September 18, 2009	Kitt Peak	Spacewatch	·	2.7 km	MPC · JPL
451180	2009 ST_{290}	—	September 25, 2009	Kitt Peak	Spacewatch	·	3.4 km	MPC · JPL
451181	2009 ST_{304}	—	August 28, 2009	Kitt Peak	Spacewatch	·	2.6 km	MPC · JPL
451182	2009 SV_{307}	—	August 16, 2009	Kitt Peak	Spacewatch	·	2.5 km	MPC · JPL
451183	2009 SB_{318}	—	September 12, 2009	Kitt Peak	Spacewatch	·	2.8 km	MPC · JPL
451184	2009 SF_{322}	—	August 18, 2009	Kitt Peak	Spacewatch	·	2.9 km	MPC · JPL
451185	2009 SG_{324}	—	March 14, 2007	Mount Lemmon	Mount Lemmon Survey	·	2.4 km	MPC · JPL
451186	2009 SS_{327}	—	September 26, 2009	Kitt Peak	Spacewatch	·	2.8 km	MPC · JPL
451187	2009 SV_{331}	—	August 17, 2009	Catalina	CSS	TIR	2.9 km	MPC · JPL
451188	2009 SG_{332}	—	September 21, 2009	Catalina	CSS	THB	3.6 km	MPC · JPL
451189	2009 SU_{336}	—	December 19, 2004	Mount Lemmon	Mount Lemmon Survey	·	3.1 km	MPC · JPL
451190	2009 SC_{345}	—	September 18, 2009	Kitt Peak	Spacewatch	·	2.5 km	MPC · JPL
451191	2009 SB_{347}	—	March 14, 2007	Mount Lemmon	Mount Lemmon Survey	·	2.9 km	MPC · JPL
451192	2009 SY_{350}	—	September 28, 2009	Mount Lemmon	Mount Lemmon Survey	·	2.9 km	MPC · JPL
451193	2009 ST_{357}	—	September 27, 2009	Kitt Peak	Spacewatch	VER	2.3 km	MPC · JPL
451194	2009 TQ_{4}	—	September 16, 2003	Kitt Peak	Spacewatch	·	3.6 km	MPC · JPL
451195	2009 TU_{17}	—	October 15, 2009	Catalina	CSS	·	4.2 km	MPC · JPL
451196	2009 TS_{23}	—	August 17, 2009	Kitt Peak	Spacewatch	·	2.6 km	MPC · JPL
451197	2009 TS_{32}	—	September 15, 2009	Kitt Peak	Spacewatch	·	2.2 km	MPC · JPL
451198	2009 UA_{7}	—	September 17, 2009	Kitt Peak	Spacewatch	THM	1.9 km	MPC · JPL
451199	2009 UC_{8}	—	October 16, 2009	Mount Lemmon	Mount Lemmon Survey	EOS	1.5 km	MPC · JPL
451200	2009 UB_{17}	—	October 20, 2009	Tzec Maun	Sachs, J.	T_{j} (2.99)	5.4 km	MPC · JPL

== 451201–451300 ==
back to top

Designation			Discovery			Properties		Ref
Permanent	Provisional	Named after	Date	Site	Discoverer(s)	Category	Diam.	Ref
451201	2009 UJ_{24}	—	October 18, 2009	Mount Lemmon	Mount Lemmon Survey	·	3.2 km	MPC · JPL
451202	2009 UU_{108}	—	October 23, 2009	Kitt Peak	Spacewatch	·	2.9 km	MPC · JPL
451203	2009 UL_{131}	—	October 18, 2009	Catalina	CSS	·	4.5 km	MPC · JPL
451204	2009 VR_{10}	—	September 21, 2009	Mount Lemmon	Mount Lemmon Survey	·	5.2 km	MPC · JPL
451205	2009 VZ_{10}	—	October 23, 2009	Kitt Peak	Spacewatch	·	3.7 km	MPC · JPL
451206	2009 VX_{11}	—	November 8, 2009	Mount Lemmon	Mount Lemmon Survey	·	3.0 km	MPC · JPL
451207	2009 VV_{37}	—	November 8, 2009	Catalina	CSS	·	1.2 km	MPC · JPL
451208	2009 VR_{66}	—	November 9, 2009	Kitt Peak	Spacewatch	·	3.4 km	MPC · JPL
451209	2009 VZ_{77}	—	November 9, 2009	Catalina	CSS	T_{j} (2.99)	4.9 km	MPC · JPL
451210	2009 VZ_{78}	—	September 18, 2009	Catalina	CSS	·	860 m	MPC · JPL
451211	2009 VU_{79}	—	November 10, 2009	Catalina	CSS	T_{j} (2.98)	3.7 km	MPC · JPL
451212	2009 WB_{8}	—	September 30, 2009	Mount Lemmon	Mount Lemmon Survey	·	3.2 km	MPC · JPL
451213	2009 WB_{110}	—	November 17, 2009	Catalina	CSS	T_{j} (2.99)	4.4 km	MPC · JPL
451214	2009 WJ_{145}	—	September 20, 2009	Mount Lemmon	Mount Lemmon Survey	·	2.5 km	MPC · JPL
451215	2009 WS_{197}	—	November 25, 2009	Mount Lemmon	Mount Lemmon Survey	CYB	4.4 km	MPC · JPL
451216	2009 WU_{259}	—	November 19, 2009	Mount Lemmon	Mount Lemmon Survey	·	3.4 km	MPC · JPL
451217	2009 XE_{11}	—	December 10, 2009	Mount Lemmon	Mount Lemmon Survey	T_{j} (2.8) · AMO · CYB · +1km	2.7 km	MPC · JPL
451218	2009 XL_{23}	—	November 27, 2009	Mount Lemmon	Mount Lemmon Survey	·	3.6 km	MPC · JPL
451219	2010 AB_{34}	—	January 7, 2010	Kitt Peak	Spacewatch	·	3.4 km	MPC · JPL
451220	2010 AP_{88}	—	September 29, 2009	Mount Lemmon	Mount Lemmon Survey	LIX	2.8 km	MPC · JPL
451221	2010 BT_{27}	—	January 18, 2010	WISE	WISE	·	3.0 km	MPC · JPL
451222	2010 BE_{67}	—	May 13, 2010	Mount Lemmon	Mount Lemmon Survey	PHO	1.7 km	MPC · JPL
451223	2010 CT_{3}	—	November 1, 2008	Kitt Peak	Spacewatch	NYS	1.2 km	MPC · JPL
451224	2010 CC_{42}	—	September 23, 2008	Mount Lemmon	Mount Lemmon Survey	(2076)	770 m	MPC · JPL
451225	2010 CF_{80}	—	February 13, 2010	Mount Lemmon	Mount Lemmon Survey	·	650 m	MPC · JPL
451226	2010 CS_{96}	—	September 4, 2008	Kitt Peak	Spacewatch	·	750 m	MPC · JPL
451227	2010 CG_{115}	—	March 13, 2007	Mount Lemmon	Mount Lemmon Survey	·	560 m	MPC · JPL
451228	2010 CQ_{125}	—	February 15, 2010	Kitt Peak	Spacewatch	·	690 m	MPC · JPL
451229	2010 CA_{179}	—	February 15, 2010	Mount Lemmon	Mount Lemmon Survey	·	870 m	MPC · JPL
451230	2010 CT_{214}	—	February 6, 2010	WISE	WISE	PHO	3.0 km	MPC · JPL
451231	2010 CD_{249}	—	March 12, 2007	Mount Lemmon	Mount Lemmon Survey	·	780 m	MPC · JPL
451232	2010 DL_{8}	—	February 16, 2010	Kitt Peak	Spacewatch	·	1.4 km	MPC · JPL
451233	2010 EL_{33}	—	March 4, 2010	Kitt Peak	Spacewatch	·	720 m	MPC · JPL
451234	2010 EW_{41}	—	November 1, 2005	Mount Lemmon	Mount Lemmon Survey	·	690 m	MPC · JPL
451235	2010 EX_{75}	—	February 19, 2010	Mount Lemmon	Mount Lemmon Survey	PHO	3.1 km	MPC · JPL
451236	2010 EM_{76}	—	October 27, 2008	Mount Lemmon	Mount Lemmon Survey	·	890 m	MPC · JPL
451237	2010 EO_{79}	—	January 5, 2003	Kitt Peak	Spacewatch	·	750 m	MPC · JPL
451238	2010 EV_{108}	—	March 14, 2010	Kitt Peak	Spacewatch	·	700 m	MPC · JPL
451239	2010 FA_{13}	—	January 12, 2010	Catalina	CSS	PHO	990 m	MPC · JPL
451240	2010 FZ_{29}	—	March 17, 2010	Kitt Peak	Spacewatch	·	670 m	MPC · JPL
451241	2010 GL_{101}	—	April 5, 2010	Kitt Peak	Spacewatch	·	1.4 km	MPC · JPL
451242	2010 GO_{102}	—	April 6, 2010	Mount Lemmon	Mount Lemmon Survey	ERI	1.4 km	MPC · JPL
451243	2010 GO_{107}	—	March 16, 2010	Kitt Peak	Spacewatch	·	860 m	MPC · JPL
451244	2010 GP_{108}	—	April 8, 2010	Kitt Peak	Spacewatch	·	1.2 km	MPC · JPL
451245	2010 GU_{111}	—	April 9, 2010	Mount Lemmon	Mount Lemmon Survey	·	1.2 km	MPC · JPL
451246	2010 GK_{158}	—	April 9, 2010	Catalina	CSS	·	1.2 km	MPC · JPL
451247	2010 HZ_{106}	—	March 3, 2006	Mount Lemmon	Mount Lemmon Survey	·	1.1 km	MPC · JPL
451248	2010 JK_{30}	—	May 3, 2010	Kitt Peak	Spacewatch	·	1.2 km	MPC · JPL
451249	2010 JP_{36}	—	February 10, 2002	Socorro	LINEAR	·	1.2 km	MPC · JPL
451250	2010 JB_{79}	—	May 11, 2010	Mount Lemmon	Mount Lemmon Survey	·	1.1 km	MPC · JPL
451251	2010 JN_{121}	—	May 12, 2010	Mount Lemmon	Mount Lemmon Survey	·	2.5 km	MPC · JPL
451252	2010 JP_{154}	—	May 5, 2010	Mount Lemmon	Mount Lemmon Survey	PHO	1.2 km	MPC · JPL
451253	2010 KD_{31}	—	May 19, 2010	WISE	WISE	DOR	2.0 km	MPC · JPL
451254	2010 KM_{74}	—	May 25, 2010	WISE	WISE	·	1.9 km	MPC · JPL
451255	2010 KW_{82}	—	May 26, 2010	WISE	WISE	·	2.6 km	MPC · JPL
451256	2010 LE_{47}	—	June 8, 2010	WISE	WISE	·	2.5 km	MPC · JPL
451257	2010 LR_{55}	—	June 9, 2010	WISE	WISE	·	1.9 km	MPC · JPL
451258	2010 LA_{84}	—	June 11, 2010	WISE	WISE	·	2.6 km	MPC · JPL
451259	2010 LX_{91}	—	June 12, 2010	WISE	WISE	·	3.0 km	MPC · JPL
451260	2010 LS_{112}	—	June 13, 2010	Mount Lemmon	Mount Lemmon Survey	·	1.6 km	MPC · JPL
451261	2010 MR_{22}	—	June 18, 2010	WISE	WISE	·	1.8 km	MPC · JPL
451262	2010 NA_{14}	—	July 5, 2010	WISE	WISE	DOR	2.7 km	MPC · JPL
451263	2010 NZ_{16}	—	July 6, 2010	WISE	WISE	·	2.9 km	MPC · JPL
451264	2010 NK_{34}	—	July 8, 2010	WISE	WISE	·	1.6 km	MPC · JPL
451265	2010 NS_{86}	—	September 15, 1996	Kitt Peak	Spacewatch	·	2.6 km	MPC · JPL
451266	2010 NF_{118}	—	August 29, 2006	Anderson Mesa	LONEOS	EUN	1.5 km	MPC · JPL
451267	2010 OP_{37}	—	July 21, 2010	WISE	WISE	·	3.3 km	MPC · JPL
451268	2010 OW_{102}	—	July 28, 2010	WISE	WISE	·	2.2 km	MPC · JPL
451269	2010 PS_{23}	—	August 2, 2010	La Sagra	OAM	·	1.5 km	MPC · JPL
451270	2010 PL_{65}	—	August 10, 2010	Kitt Peak	Spacewatch	AGN	1.0 km	MPC · JPL
451271	2010 RL_{3}	—	September 1, 2010	Socorro	LINEAR	·	2.4 km	MPC · JPL
451272	2010 RB_{9}	—	May 5, 2002	Socorro	LINEAR	H	640 m	MPC · JPL
451273	2010 RV_{43}	—	August 28, 2005	Kitt Peak	Spacewatch	·	1.7 km	MPC · JPL
451274	2010 RB_{47}	—	February 9, 2008	Mount Lemmon	Mount Lemmon Survey	·	1.9 km	MPC · JPL
451275	2010 RK_{61}	—	September 6, 2010	Kitt Peak	Spacewatch	EOS	1.7 km	MPC · JPL
451276	2010 RM_{69}	—	August 27, 2001	Kitt Peak	Spacewatch	WIT	920 m	MPC · JPL
451277	2010 RR_{70}	—	September 9, 2010	Kitt Peak	Spacewatch	HOF	2.4 km	MPC · JPL
451278	2010 RQ_{98}	—	September 10, 2010	Kitt Peak	Spacewatch	·	1.7 km	MPC · JPL
451279	2010 RA_{101}	—	September 10, 2010	Kitt Peak	Spacewatch	GEF	1.2 km	MPC · JPL
451280	2010 RQ_{102}	—	September 10, 2010	Kitt Peak	Spacewatch	·	1.6 km	MPC · JPL
451281	2010 RN_{105}	—	October 17, 2001	Kitt Peak	Spacewatch	·	1.9 km	MPC · JPL
451282	2010 RU_{117}	—	April 6, 2008	Kitt Peak	Spacewatch	GEF	1.3 km	MPC · JPL
451283	2010 RO_{128}	—	September 14, 2010	Kitt Peak	Spacewatch	·	2.3 km	MPC · JPL
451284	2010 RS_{137}	—	January 10, 2008	Mount Lemmon	Mount Lemmon Survey	EUN	1.3 km	MPC · JPL
451285	2010 RZ_{141}	—	September 2, 2010	Mount Lemmon	Mount Lemmon Survey	·	2.3 km	MPC · JPL
451286	2010 RL_{175}	—	September 9, 2010	Kitt Peak	Spacewatch	·	2.4 km	MPC · JPL
451287	2010 SM_{8}	—	August 23, 2001	Kitt Peak	Spacewatch	AGN	820 m	MPC · JPL
451288	2010 SN_{34}	—	September 30, 2010	Mount Lemmon	Mount Lemmon Survey	·	1.6 km	MPC · JPL
451289	2010 SS_{37}	—	September 20, 2001	Socorro	LINEAR	·	1.7 km	MPC · JPL
451290	2010 TG_{8}	—	October 1, 2010	Kitt Peak	Spacewatch	·	2.0 km	MPC · JPL
451291	2010 TB_{11}	—	July 11, 2010	WISE	WISE	·	1.8 km	MPC · JPL
451292	2010 TC_{13}	—	September 19, 2010	Kitt Peak	Spacewatch	·	1.9 km	MPC · JPL
451293	2010 TF_{18}	—	September 15, 2010	Mount Lemmon	Mount Lemmon Survey	WIT	940 m	MPC · JPL
451294	2010 TT_{29}	—	August 30, 2005	Kitt Peak	Spacewatch	·	1.6 km	MPC · JPL
451295	2010 TM_{33}	—	October 2, 2010	Kitt Peak	Spacewatch	HOF	2.1 km	MPC · JPL
451296	2010 TO_{40}	—	September 10, 2010	Kitt Peak	Spacewatch	·	1.5 km	MPC · JPL
451297	2010 TK_{54}	—	October 8, 2010	Haleakala	Pan-STARRS 1	APO · PHA	510 m	MPC · JPL
451298	2010 TD_{113}	—	August 29, 2005	Kitt Peak	Spacewatch	·	1.7 km	MPC · JPL
451299	2010 TT_{113}	—	August 30, 2005	Kitt Peak	Spacewatch	KOR	1.1 km	MPC · JPL
451300	2010 TG_{117}	—	April 3, 2008	Mount Lemmon	Mount Lemmon Survey	KOR	1.1 km	MPC · JPL

== 451301–451400 ==
back to top

Designation			Discovery			Properties		Ref
Permanent	Provisional	Named after	Date	Site	Discoverer(s)	Category	Diam.	Ref
451301	2010 TD_{120}	—	July 3, 2005	Mount Lemmon	Mount Lemmon Survey	·	2.0 km	MPC · JPL
451302	2010 TT_{138}	—	September 17, 2010	Mount Lemmon	Mount Lemmon Survey	·	1.6 km	MPC · JPL
451303	2010 TW_{141}	—	November 5, 2005	Kitt Peak	Spacewatch	·	1.8 km	MPC · JPL
451304	2010 TL_{150}	—	October 4, 2006	Mount Lemmon	Mount Lemmon Survey	·	1.9 km	MPC · JPL
451305	2010 TG_{154}	—	September 18, 2010	Mount Lemmon	Mount Lemmon Survey	·	1.7 km	MPC · JPL
451306	2010 TS_{160}	—	September 18, 2010	Mount Lemmon	Mount Lemmon Survey	·	2.1 km	MPC · JPL
451307	2010 TN_{173}	—	August 29, 2005	Kitt Peak	Spacewatch	·	1.9 km	MPC · JPL
451308	2010 TD_{178}	—	September 16, 2010	Kitt Peak	Spacewatch	MRX	840 m	MPC · JPL
451309	2010 TW_{184}	—	September 17, 2010	Kitt Peak	Spacewatch	·	1.8 km	MPC · JPL
451310	2010 UU_{2}	—	October 17, 2010	Mount Lemmon	Mount Lemmon Survey	(1118)	2.9 km	MPC · JPL
451311	2010 UE_{11}	—	October 28, 2010	Kitt Peak	Spacewatch	·	3.5 km	MPC · JPL
451312	2010 UF_{25}	—	October 28, 2010	Kitt Peak	Spacewatch	·	2.6 km	MPC · JPL
451313	2010 UE_{50}	—	October 31, 2010	Mount Lemmon	Mount Lemmon Survey	·	1.7 km	MPC · JPL
451314	2010 UW_{53}	—	October 17, 2010	Mount Lemmon	Mount Lemmon Survey	EOS	1.5 km	MPC · JPL
451315	2010 UY_{53}	—	October 17, 2010	Mount Lemmon	Mount Lemmon Survey	VER	2.6 km	MPC · JPL
451316	2010 UZ_{67}	—	October 10, 2010	Kitt Peak	Spacewatch	EOS	1.4 km	MPC · JPL
451317	2010 UD_{68}	—	October 10, 2005	Kitt Peak	Spacewatch	·	1.9 km	MPC · JPL
451318	2010 UM_{93}	—	October 13, 2010	Mount Lemmon	Mount Lemmon Survey	·	2.9 km	MPC · JPL
451319	2010 UN_{98}	—	October 29, 2010	Mount Lemmon	Mount Lemmon Survey	·	3.3 km	MPC · JPL
451320	2010 VS_{48}	—	July 21, 2004	Siding Spring	SSS	·	1.5 km	MPC · JPL
451321	2010 VW_{48}	—	April 30, 2009	Kitt Peak	Spacewatch	·	2.4 km	MPC · JPL
451322	2010 VO_{51}	—	October 29, 2010	Mount Lemmon	Mount Lemmon Survey	EOS	2.2 km	MPC · JPL
451323	2010 VC_{58}	—	September 18, 2010	Mount Lemmon	Mount Lemmon Survey	·	2.2 km	MPC · JPL
451324	2010 VL_{58}	—	October 13, 2010	Mount Lemmon	Mount Lemmon Survey	·	3.6 km	MPC · JPL
451325	2010 VY_{59}	—	November 4, 2010	Mount Lemmon	Mount Lemmon Survey	·	2.6 km	MPC · JPL
451326	2010 VP_{60}	—	August 6, 2010	WISE	WISE	·	3.8 km	MPC · JPL
451327	2010 VE_{62}	—	November 22, 2005	Kitt Peak	Spacewatch	·	3.1 km	MPC · JPL
451328	2010 VV_{81}	—	November 3, 2010	Kitt Peak	Spacewatch	·	2.5 km	MPC · JPL
451329	2010 VK_{88}	—	October 29, 2010	Kitt Peak	Spacewatch	·	2.1 km	MPC · JPL
451330	2010 VP_{92}	—	March 10, 2008	Mount Lemmon	Mount Lemmon Survey	·	2.1 km	MPC · JPL
451331	2010 VH_{101}	—	November 5, 2010	Kitt Peak	Spacewatch	·	3.4 km	MPC · JPL
451332	2010 VT_{101}	—	November 5, 2010	Kitt Peak	Spacewatch	·	3.0 km	MPC · JPL
451333	2010 VY_{113}	—	October 30, 2010	Kitt Peak	Spacewatch	EOS	2.1 km	MPC · JPL
451334	2010 VM_{114}	—	March 13, 2007	Mount Lemmon	Mount Lemmon Survey	·	3.2 km	MPC · JPL
451335	2010 VQ_{116}	—	October 9, 2010	Mount Lemmon	Mount Lemmon Survey	·	2.2 km	MPC · JPL
451336	2010 VN_{119}	—	November 8, 2010	Kitt Peak	Spacewatch	·	2.8 km	MPC · JPL
451337	2010 VD_{132}	—	October 28, 2005	Mount Lemmon	Mount Lemmon Survey	·	1.5 km	MPC · JPL
451338	2010 VY_{167}	—	November 10, 2010	Mount Lemmon	Mount Lemmon Survey	·	2.2 km	MPC · JPL
451339	2010 VB_{173}	—	November 10, 2010	Mount Lemmon	Mount Lemmon Survey	·	2.6 km	MPC · JPL
451340	2010 VK_{180}	—	November 5, 2010	Kitt Peak	Spacewatch	·	2.2 km	MPC · JPL
451341	2010 VR_{184}	—	November 21, 2005	Kitt Peak	Spacewatch	·	1.6 km	MPC · JPL
451342	2010 VT_{196}	—	January 10, 2006	Mount Lemmon	Mount Lemmon Survey	·	3.6 km	MPC · JPL
451343	2010 VE_{207}	—	October 13, 2010	Mount Lemmon	Mount Lemmon Survey	·	2.3 km	MPC · JPL
451344	2010 VS_{209}	—	October 13, 2010	Mount Lemmon	Mount Lemmon Survey	·	2.0 km	MPC · JPL
451345	2010 VY_{210}	—	September 26, 2005	Kitt Peak	Spacewatch	·	1.7 km	MPC · JPL
451346	2010 VM_{213}	—	November 12, 2005	Kitt Peak	Spacewatch	·	1.3 km	MPC · JPL
451347	2010 VR_{218}	—	October 29, 2005	Catalina	CSS	·	1.6 km	MPC · JPL
451348	2010 WQ_{4}	—	November 22, 2005	Kitt Peak	Spacewatch	·	1.8 km	MPC · JPL
451349	2010 WF_{11}	—	October 30, 2010	Mount Lemmon	Mount Lemmon Survey	·	1.6 km	MPC · JPL
451350	2010 WW_{20}	—	November 11, 2010	Mount Lemmon	Mount Lemmon Survey	EOS	2.0 km	MPC · JPL
451351	2010 WL_{23}	—	November 1, 2010	Kitt Peak	Spacewatch	EOS	2.0 km	MPC · JPL
451352	2010 WN_{43}	—	November 11, 2010	Kitt Peak	Spacewatch	·	1.4 km	MPC · JPL
451353	2010 WF_{47}	—	November 27, 2010	Mount Lemmon	Mount Lemmon Survey	TEL	1.5 km	MPC · JPL
451354	2010 WD_{48}	—	November 2, 2010	Kitt Peak	Spacewatch	·	3.1 km	MPC · JPL
451355	2010 WF_{51}	—	October 13, 2010	Mount Lemmon	Mount Lemmon Survey	EOS	2.1 km	MPC · JPL
451356	2010 WR_{53}	—	December 1, 2005	Kitt Peak	Spacewatch	·	3.0 km	MPC · JPL
451357	2010 WY_{53}	—	November 14, 2010	Kitt Peak	Spacewatch	·	2.0 km	MPC · JPL
451358	2010 WX_{66}	—	October 29, 2010	Kitt Peak	Spacewatch	·	2.5 km	MPC · JPL
451359	2010 XJ_{7}	—	October 10, 2004	Kitt Peak	Spacewatch	·	1.9 km	MPC · JPL
451360	2010 XP_{10}	—	December 4, 2010	Catalina	CSS	H	790 m	MPC · JPL
451361	2010 XK_{12}	—	October 9, 2004	Kitt Peak	Spacewatch	·	2.1 km	MPC · JPL
451362	2010 XL_{12}	—	January 23, 2006	Catalina	CSS	·	3.1 km	MPC · JPL
451363	2010 XN_{22}	—	November 29, 2005	Kitt Peak	Spacewatch	·	2.0 km	MPC · JPL
451364	2010 XX_{25}	—	January 4, 2006	Kitt Peak	Spacewatch	·	1.6 km	MPC · JPL
451365	2010 XU_{35}	—	November 30, 2005	Kitt Peak	Spacewatch	EOS	1.8 km	MPC · JPL
451366	2010 XP_{39}	—	September 4, 2010	Kitt Peak	Spacewatch	·	3.7 km	MPC · JPL
451367	2010 XP_{76}	—	December 3, 2010	Mount Lemmon	Mount Lemmon Survey	·	3.2 km	MPC · JPL
451368	2010 XA_{79}	—	November 2, 2010	Kitt Peak	Spacewatch	·	1.8 km	MPC · JPL
451369	2010 XG_{83}	—	August 16, 2004	Siding Spring	SSS	·	2.3 km	MPC · JPL
451370	2011 AK_{5}	—	January 8, 2011	Mount Lemmon	Mount Lemmon Survey	APO · PHA	180 m	MPC · JPL
451371	2011 AX_{19}	—	October 14, 2010	Mount Lemmon	Mount Lemmon Survey	·	2.4 km	MPC · JPL
451372	2011 AQ_{21}	—	September 15, 2009	Kitt Peak	Spacewatch	LIX	3.4 km	MPC · JPL
451373	2011 AS_{34}	—	December 15, 2004	Socorro	LINEAR	·	4.4 km	MPC · JPL
451374	2011 AJ_{35}	—	December 9, 2010	Mount Lemmon	Mount Lemmon Survey	LIX	3.9 km	MPC · JPL
451375	2011 AH_{60}	—	September 16, 2009	Mount Lemmon	Mount Lemmon Survey	·	2.4 km	MPC · JPL
451376	2011 AS_{63}	—	September 27, 2009	Kitt Peak	Spacewatch	·	2.0 km	MPC · JPL
451377	2011 AL_{74}	—	December 2, 2004	Kitt Peak	Spacewatch	THB	2.8 km	MPC · JPL
451378	2011 AM_{79}	—	December 12, 2004	Kitt Peak	Spacewatch	·	4.0 km	MPC · JPL
451379	2011 BG	—	December 3, 2010	Mount Lemmon	Mount Lemmon Survey	LIX	2.9 km	MPC · JPL
451380	2011 BR_{2}	—	November 15, 2010	Mount Lemmon	Mount Lemmon Survey	VER	2.6 km	MPC · JPL
451381	2011 BE_{15}	—	September 16, 2003	Kitt Peak	Spacewatch	·	3.7 km	MPC · JPL
451382	2011 BJ_{15}	—	January 25, 2011	Catalina	CSS	T_{j} (2.98)	3.8 km	MPC · JPL
451383	2011 BA_{25}	—	December 5, 2010	Mount Lemmon	Mount Lemmon Survey	·	4.1 km	MPC · JPL
451384	2011 BA_{53}	—	September 7, 2008	Mount Lemmon	Mount Lemmon Survey	·	3.0 km	MPC · JPL
451385	2011 BY_{57}	—	February 11, 2010	WISE	WISE	CYB	3.7 km	MPC · JPL
451386	2011 BY_{63}	—	January 10, 2011	Mount Lemmon	Mount Lemmon Survey	H	630 m	MPC · JPL
451387	2011 CQ_{8}	—	July 29, 2009	Kitt Peak	Spacewatch	·	3.0 km	MPC · JPL
451388	2011 CG_{10}	—	March 23, 2006	Mount Lemmon	Mount Lemmon Survey	·	2.3 km	MPC · JPL
451389	2011 CT_{40}	—	January 14, 2010	WISE	WISE	·	2.5 km	MPC · JPL
451390	2011 CQ_{60}	—	September 16, 2009	Kitt Peak	Spacewatch	·	1.9 km	MPC · JPL
451391	2011 CR_{66}	—	January 13, 2011	Kitt Peak	Spacewatch	·	2.8 km	MPC · JPL
451392	2011 CJ_{75}	—	October 26, 2009	Mount Lemmon	Mount Lemmon Survey	T_{j} (2.99)	3.1 km	MPC · JPL
451393	2011 DQ_{10}	—	January 13, 2010	WISE	WISE	T_{j} (2.96)	2.9 km	MPC · JPL
451394	2011 DD_{11}	—	February 10, 2011	Mount Lemmon	Mount Lemmon Survey	·	2.1 km	MPC · JPL
451395	2011 DF_{31}	—	January 2, 2011	Mount Lemmon	Mount Lemmon Survey	·	2.7 km	MPC · JPL
451396	2011 ED_{18}	—	February 22, 2011	Kitt Peak	Spacewatch	H	610 m	MPC · JPL
451397	2011 EZ_{78}	—	March 15, 2011	Mount Lemmon	Mount Lemmon Survey	AMO +1km	1.3 km	MPC · JPL
451398	2011 FV_{8}	—	March 4, 2011	Mount Lemmon	Mount Lemmon Survey	H	790 m	MPC · JPL
451399	2011 FA_{12}	—	March 2, 2005	Socorro	LINEAR	T_{j} (2.92)	1.5 km	MPC · JPL
451400	2011 HD_{73}	—	October 31, 1999	Kitt Peak	Spacewatch	·	610 m	MPC · JPL

== 451401–451500 ==
back to top

Designation			Discovery			Properties		Ref
Permanent	Provisional	Named after	Date	Site	Discoverer(s)	Category	Diam.	Ref
451401	2011 KT_{12}	—	April 27, 2011	Catalina	CSS	·	850 m	MPC · JPL
451402	2011 KL_{18}	—	January 7, 2010	Mount Lemmon	Mount Lemmon Survey	·	630 m	MPC · JPL
451403	2011 MG_{3}	—	June 26, 2011	Mount Lemmon	Mount Lemmon Survey	·	1.1 km	MPC · JPL
451404	2011 NJ_{1}	—	October 10, 2008	Mount Lemmon	Mount Lemmon Survey	·	930 m	MPC · JPL
451405	2011 OA_{9}	—	October 29, 2008	Kitt Peak	Spacewatch	·	1.0 km	MPC · JPL
451406	2011 OG_{13}	—	November 4, 2004	Kitt Peak	Spacewatch	·	840 m	MPC · JPL
451407	2011 OZ_{16}	—	January 20, 2006	Kitt Peak	Spacewatch	·	1.3 km	MPC · JPL
451408	2011 OF_{20}	—	May 28, 2011	Mount Lemmon	Mount Lemmon Survey	·	700 m	MPC · JPL
451409	2011 OF_{24}	—	July 28, 2011	Siding Spring	SSS	·	840 m	MPC · JPL
451410	2011 PP_{11}	—	June 12, 2011	Mount Lemmon	Mount Lemmon Survey	·	1.0 km	MPC · JPL
451411	2011 QK_{27}	—	September 24, 2000	Socorro	LINEAR	·	1.1 km	MPC · JPL
451412	2011 QS_{28}	—	March 11, 2007	Catalina	CSS	·	940 m	MPC · JPL
451413	2011 QZ_{31}	—	September 24, 2000	Socorro	LINEAR	·	960 m	MPC · JPL
451414	2011 QR_{46}	—	May 28, 2011	Mount Lemmon	Mount Lemmon Survey	·	1.5 km	MPC · JPL
451415	2011 QY_{46}	—	June 17, 2007	Kitt Peak	Spacewatch	·	1.2 km	MPC · JPL
451416	2011 QR_{53}	—	October 8, 2008	Mount Lemmon	Mount Lemmon Survey	·	580 m	MPC · JPL
451417	2011 QY_{53}	—	November 29, 2005	Kitt Peak	Spacewatch	·	820 m	MPC · JPL
451418	2011 QN_{56}	—	October 8, 2004	Kitt Peak	Spacewatch	NYS	860 m	MPC · JPL
451419	2011 QU_{68}	—	December 13, 2004	Kitt Peak	Spacewatch	NYS	1.2 km	MPC · JPL
451420	2011 QM_{73}	—	October 8, 2004	Kitt Peak	Spacewatch	·	850 m	MPC · JPL
451421	2011 QK_{74}	—	August 23, 2007	Kitt Peak	Spacewatch	·	1.1 km	MPC · JPL
451422	2011 QV_{77}	—	September 28, 2000	Kitt Peak	Spacewatch	·	1.1 km	MPC · JPL
451423	2011 QL_{85}	—	December 29, 2008	Mount Lemmon	Mount Lemmon Survey	·	990 m	MPC · JPL
451424	2011 RH_{4}	—	September 7, 2011	Kitt Peak	Spacewatch	MAS	680 m	MPC · JPL
451425	2011 RS_{4}	—	August 22, 2007	Anderson Mesa	LONEOS	·	1.1 km	MPC · JPL
451426	2011 RM_{5}	—	October 23, 2008	Kitt Peak	Spacewatch	·	700 m	MPC · JPL
451427	2011 RN_{6}	—	March 13, 2010	Mount Lemmon	Mount Lemmon Survey	·	700 m	MPC · JPL
451428	2011 RH_{9}	—	October 9, 1993	Kitt Peak	Spacewatch	·	1.0 km	MPC · JPL
451429	2011 RL_{16}	—	January 25, 2009	Kitt Peak	Spacewatch	·	1.3 km	MPC · JPL
451430	2011 SK_{2}	—	February 5, 2009	Kitt Peak	Spacewatch	·	850 m	MPC · JPL
451431	2011 SA_{3}	—	January 26, 2006	Kitt Peak	Spacewatch	·	800 m	MPC · JPL
451432	2011 SV_{3}	—	September 27, 2000	Socorro	LINEAR	·	1.3 km	MPC · JPL
451433	2011 SK_{11}	—	October 17, 2007	Mount Lemmon	Mount Lemmon Survey	·	1.3 km	MPC · JPL
451434	2011 SL_{30}	—	January 31, 2006	Kitt Peak	Spacewatch	·	1.4 km	MPC · JPL
451435	2011 SW_{33}	—	February 2, 2009	Mount Lemmon	Mount Lemmon Survey	V	630 m	MPC · JPL
451436	2011 SU_{39}	—	September 21, 2011	Kitt Peak	Spacewatch	·	2.0 km	MPC · JPL
451437	2011 SD_{52}	—	September 9, 2011	Kitt Peak	Spacewatch	·	1.0 km	MPC · JPL
451438	2011 SA_{80}	—	February 12, 2002	Kitt Peak	Spacewatch	V	640 m	MPC · JPL
451439	2011 SZ_{90}	—	September 22, 2011	Kitt Peak	Spacewatch	·	1.3 km	MPC · JPL
451440	2011 SY_{102}	—	September 20, 2011	Catalina	CSS	·	1.3 km	MPC · JPL
451441	2011 SL_{103}	—	September 8, 2011	Kitt Peak	Spacewatch	·	1.2 km	MPC · JPL
451442	2011 SM_{105}	—	September 23, 2011	Kitt Peak	Spacewatch	·	1.2 km	MPC · JPL
451443	2011 SL_{128}	—	September 8, 2007	Mount Lemmon	Mount Lemmon Survey	·	700 m	MPC · JPL
451444	2011 SO_{129}	—	February 25, 2006	Kitt Peak	Spacewatch	·	1.3 km	MPC · JPL
451445	2011 SV_{134}	—	September 18, 2011	Mount Lemmon	Mount Lemmon Survey	V	720 m	MPC · JPL
451446	2011 SO_{139}	—	October 4, 2007	Mount Lemmon	Mount Lemmon Survey	·	1.1 km	MPC · JPL
451447	2011 SD_{169}	—	October 19, 2003	Kitt Peak	Spacewatch	·	500 m	MPC · JPL
451448	2011 SL_{175}	—	December 20, 2004	Mount Lemmon	Mount Lemmon Survey	·	1.3 km	MPC · JPL
451449	2011 SP_{175}	—	February 4, 2005	Kitt Peak	Spacewatch	MAS	730 m	MPC · JPL
451450	2011 SF_{204}	—	March 3, 2009	Kitt Peak	Spacewatch	·	1.3 km	MPC · JPL
451451	2011 SH_{205}	—	January 15, 2005	Kitt Peak	Spacewatch	NYS	1.1 km	MPC · JPL
451452	2011 SN_{208}	—	March 2, 2009	Mount Lemmon	Mount Lemmon Survey	·	1.4 km	MPC · JPL
451453	2011 SN_{218}	—	November 7, 2007	Catalina	CSS	·	1.3 km	MPC · JPL
451454	2011 SO_{232}	—	January 19, 2009	Mount Lemmon	Mount Lemmon Survey	·	1.4 km	MPC · JPL
451455	2011 SV_{242}	—	August 11, 2007	Anderson Mesa	LONEOS	·	1.1 km	MPC · JPL
451456	2011 SS_{247}	—	March 24, 2006	Kitt Peak	Spacewatch	·	1.4 km	MPC · JPL
451457	2011 SC_{255}	—	December 9, 2004	Kitt Peak	Spacewatch	·	1.2 km	MPC · JPL
451458	2011 SD_{263}	—	December 4, 2008	Mount Lemmon	Mount Lemmon Survey	·	1.0 km	MPC · JPL
451459	2011 TW_{7}	—	September 13, 2007	Catalina	CSS	·	1.6 km	MPC · JPL
451460	2011 TS_{10}	—	December 11, 2004	Kitt Peak	Spacewatch	·	1.2 km	MPC · JPL
451461	2011 UU_{7}	—	October 18, 2011	Mount Lemmon	Mount Lemmon Survey	·	960 m	MPC · JPL
451462	2011 UE_{8}	—	November 14, 2007	Kitt Peak	Spacewatch	(5)	1.0 km	MPC · JPL
451463	2011 UF_{8}	—	October 15, 2007	Kitt Peak	Spacewatch	·	790 m	MPC · JPL
451464	2011 UA_{16}	—	October 14, 1999	Kitt Peak	Spacewatch	(5)	760 m	MPC · JPL
451465	2011 UK_{16}	—	February 20, 2009	Kitt Peak	Spacewatch	NYS	900 m	MPC · JPL
451466	2011 UM_{22}	—	September 2, 2007	Mount Lemmon	Mount Lemmon Survey	·	1.4 km	MPC · JPL
451467	2011 UR_{24}	—	August 24, 2007	Kitt Peak	Spacewatch	NYS	960 m	MPC · JPL
451468	2011 UA_{25}	—	October 11, 2007	Mount Lemmon	Mount Lemmon Survey	·	1.2 km	MPC · JPL
451469	2011 UV_{27}	—	November 1, 2000	Socorro	LINEAR	MAS	800 m	MPC · JPL
451470	2011 UB_{32}	—	February 18, 2004	Kitt Peak	Spacewatch	·	1.9 km	MPC · JPL
451471	2011 UP_{38}	—	November 17, 2007	Kitt Peak	Spacewatch	·	1.2 km	MPC · JPL
451472	2011 UB_{46}	—	September 13, 2007	Mount Lemmon	Mount Lemmon Survey	·	880 m	MPC · JPL
451473	2011 UA_{49}	—	October 18, 2011	Kitt Peak	Spacewatch	·	1.1 km	MPC · JPL
451474	2011 UO_{50}	—	September 14, 2007	Mount Lemmon	Mount Lemmon Survey	·	770 m	MPC · JPL
451475	2011 UL_{51}	—	April 20, 2009	Kitt Peak	Spacewatch	ADE	1.8 km	MPC · JPL
451476	2011 UU_{52}	—	November 5, 2007	Kitt Peak	Spacewatch	BRG	1.0 km	MPC · JPL
451477	2011 UC_{56}	—	October 16, 2007	Mount Lemmon	Mount Lemmon Survey	·	1.2 km	MPC · JPL
451478	2011 UF_{56}	—	October 16, 2007	Mount Lemmon	Mount Lemmon Survey	MAR	860 m	MPC · JPL
451479	2011 UK_{65}	—	February 2, 2009	Catalina	CSS	·	1.7 km	MPC · JPL
451480	2011 UX_{66}	—	January 19, 2005	Kitt Peak	Spacewatch	·	1.1 km	MPC · JPL
451481	2011 UP_{77}	—	October 19, 2011	Kitt Peak	Spacewatch	·	1.2 km	MPC · JPL
451482	2011 UN_{88}	—	October 21, 2011	Mount Lemmon	Mount Lemmon Survey	·	1.3 km	MPC · JPL
451483	2011 UM_{89}	—	April 10, 2005	Kitt Peak	Spacewatch	·	2.4 km	MPC · JPL
451484	2011 UP_{103}	—	October 20, 2011	Kitt Peak	Spacewatch	·	2.0 km	MPC · JPL
451485	2011 UQ_{103}	—	February 11, 2004	Kitt Peak	Spacewatch	·	1.7 km	MPC · JPL
451486	2011 UK_{142}	—	November 3, 2007	Kitt Peak	Spacewatch	(5)	990 m	MPC · JPL
451487	2011 UA_{155}	—	August 14, 2007	Siding Spring	SSS	·	1.0 km	MPC · JPL
451488	2011 UB_{176}	—	October 20, 2011	Mount Lemmon	Mount Lemmon Survey	·	1.9 km	MPC · JPL
451489	2011 UJ_{178}	—	April 16, 2010	WISE	WISE	·	3.9 km	MPC · JPL
451490	2011 UW_{182}	—	April 10, 2005	Mount Lemmon	Mount Lemmon Survey	·	2.3 km	MPC · JPL
451491	2011 US_{186}	—	November 8, 2007	Kitt Peak	Spacewatch	·	1.1 km	MPC · JPL
451492	2011 UP_{187}	—	December 18, 2003	Kitt Peak	Spacewatch	·	860 m	MPC · JPL
451493	2011 UC_{198}	—	December 30, 2000	Socorro	LINEAR	·	1.2 km	MPC · JPL
451494	2011 UQ_{198}	—	September 24, 2011	Mount Lemmon	Mount Lemmon Survey	·	2.1 km	MPC · JPL
451495	2011 UY_{198}	—	November 13, 2007	Kitt Peak	Spacewatch	·	1 km	MPC · JPL
451496	2011 UL_{209}	—	September 11, 2007	Kitt Peak	Spacewatch	·	950 m	MPC · JPL
451497	2011 UN_{234}	—	September 10, 2007	Kitt Peak	Spacewatch	·	800 m	MPC · JPL
451498	2011 UL_{239}	—	October 8, 2007	Catalina	CSS	·	1.1 km	MPC · JPL
451499	2011 UP_{242}	—	September 24, 2011	Mount Lemmon	Mount Lemmon Survey	·	1.8 km	MPC · JPL
451500	2011 UA_{248}	—	November 13, 2007	Kitt Peak	Spacewatch	·	1.2 km	MPC · JPL

== 451501–451600 ==
back to top

Designation			Discovery			Properties		Ref
Permanent	Provisional	Named after	Date	Site	Discoverer(s)	Category	Diam.	Ref
451501	2011 UP_{252}	—	November 4, 2007	Kitt Peak	Spacewatch	·	1.0 km	MPC · JPL
451502	2011 UM_{258}	—	October 17, 2007	Mount Lemmon	Mount Lemmon Survey	·	830 m	MPC · JPL
451503	2011 UH_{262}	—	November 9, 2007	Kitt Peak	Spacewatch	·	1.4 km	MPC · JPL
451504	2011 UZ_{262}	—	May 23, 2010	WISE	WISE	KON	2.5 km	MPC · JPL
451505	2011 UX_{273}	—	September 14, 2007	Mount Lemmon	Mount Lemmon Survey	·	940 m	MPC · JPL
451506	2011 UW_{305}	—	October 4, 2007	Mount Lemmon	Mount Lemmon Survey	MAS	720 m	MPC · JPL
451507	2011 UM_{312}	—	September 22, 2011	Mount Lemmon	Mount Lemmon Survey	·	1.9 km	MPC · JPL
451508	2011 UD_{316}	—	November 5, 2007	Mount Lemmon	Mount Lemmon Survey	·	1.3 km	MPC · JPL
451509	2011 UQ_{317}	—	December 16, 2007	Catalina	CSS	·	1.6 km	MPC · JPL
451510	2011 UE_{331}	—	December 11, 1998	Kitt Peak	Spacewatch	·	1.8 km	MPC · JPL
451511	2011 UC_{339}	—	September 14, 2007	Kitt Peak	Spacewatch	·	1.0 km	MPC · JPL
451512	2011 UD_{340}	—	September 10, 2004	Kitt Peak	Spacewatch	V	530 m	MPC · JPL
451513	2011 UA_{345}	—	October 5, 2007	Kitt Peak	Spacewatch	·	1.2 km	MPC · JPL
451514	2011 UZ_{349}	—	June 13, 2010	WISE	WISE	·	2.4 km	MPC · JPL
451515	2011 UY_{361}	—	November 18, 2007	Mount Lemmon	Mount Lemmon Survey	·	1.2 km	MPC · JPL
451516	2011 UA_{367}	—	September 14, 2007	Kitt Peak	Spacewatch	MAS	680 m	MPC · JPL
451517	2011 UP_{385}	—	September 27, 2011	Mount Lemmon	Mount Lemmon Survey	·	1.0 km	MPC · JPL
451518	2011 UE_{386}	—	October 29, 1998	Kitt Peak	Spacewatch	EUN	900 m	MPC · JPL
451519	2011 UK_{392}	—	November 20, 2007	Mount Lemmon	Mount Lemmon Survey	·	1.3 km	MPC · JPL
451520	2011 UW_{396}	—	November 24, 2003	Socorro	LINEAR	·	2.6 km	MPC · JPL
451521	2011 UZ_{398}	—	October 16, 2007	Catalina	CSS	·	1.4 km	MPC · JPL
451522	2011 VC_{6}	—	October 17, 2007	Mount Lemmon	Mount Lemmon Survey	EUN	810 m	MPC · JPL
451523	2011 VG_{7}	—	November 14, 2007	Kitt Peak	Spacewatch	·	1.3 km	MPC · JPL
451524	2011 VA_{16}	—	November 3, 2011	Kitt Peak	Spacewatch	·	1.9 km	MPC · JPL
451525	2011 WV_{3}	—	June 12, 2010	WISE	WISE	·	3.2 km	MPC · JPL
451526	2011 WH_{6}	—	January 20, 2009	Kitt Peak	Spacewatch	·	800 m	MPC · JPL
451527	2011 WM_{11}	—	November 16, 2011	Mount Lemmon	Mount Lemmon Survey	·	1.4 km	MPC · JPL
451528	2011 WN_{11}	—	March 2, 2009	Mount Lemmon	Mount Lemmon Survey	KON	2.6 km	MPC · JPL
451529	2011 WJ_{20}	—	October 13, 2006	Kitt Peak	Spacewatch	GEF	1.3 km	MPC · JPL
451530	2011 WZ_{30}	—	November 2, 2011	Kitt Peak	Spacewatch	EUN	1.1 km	MPC · JPL
451531	2011 WM_{34}	—	October 27, 2011	Mount Lemmon	Mount Lemmon Survey	(5)	900 m	MPC · JPL
451532	2011 WU_{34}	—	October 22, 2011	Kitt Peak	Spacewatch	·	1.0 km	MPC · JPL
451533	2011 WY_{34}	—	April 30, 2009	Catalina	CSS	EUN	1.5 km	MPC · JPL
451534	2011 WO_{35}	—	November 22, 2011	XuYi	PMO NEO Survey Program	·	1.9 km	MPC · JPL
451535	2011 WW_{40}	—	November 17, 2007	Mount Lemmon	Mount Lemmon Survey	·	1.3 km	MPC · JPL
451536	2011 WX_{49}	—	October 9, 2007	Mount Lemmon	Mount Lemmon Survey	·	1.0 km	MPC · JPL
451537	2011 WJ_{52}	—	November 23, 2011	Mount Lemmon	Mount Lemmon Survey	·	1.3 km	MPC · JPL
451538	2011 WJ_{63}	—	November 16, 2011	Mount Lemmon	Mount Lemmon Survey	·	1.2 km	MPC · JPL
451539	2011 WE_{70}	—	November 8, 2007	Mount Lemmon	Mount Lemmon Survey	·	1.8 km	MPC · JPL
451540	2011 WP_{73}	—	December 5, 2007	Kitt Peak	Spacewatch	·	1.6 km	MPC · JPL
451541	2011 WF_{84}	—	December 21, 2003	Kitt Peak	Spacewatch	·	930 m	MPC · JPL
451542	2011 WU_{90}	—	August 28, 2006	Siding Spring	SSS	JUN	1.2 km	MPC · JPL
451543	2011 WY_{96}	—	August 19, 2006	Anderson Mesa	LONEOS	·	1.5 km	MPC · JPL
451544	2011 WV_{107}	—	November 30, 2011	Kitt Peak	Spacewatch	(5)	1.1 km	MPC · JPL
451545	2011 WG_{112}	—	October 28, 2011	Kitt Peak	Spacewatch	·	1.0 km	MPC · JPL
451546	2011 WJ_{112}	—	October 24, 2011	Kitt Peak	Spacewatch	·	1.1 km	MPC · JPL
451547	2011 WQ_{114}	—	December 27, 2003	Socorro	LINEAR	·	1.1 km	MPC · JPL
451548	2011 WE_{116}	—	November 11, 2007	Mount Lemmon	Mount Lemmon Survey	·	1.1 km	MPC · JPL
451549	2011 WH_{118}	—	December 17, 2007	Mount Lemmon	Mount Lemmon Survey	·	1.1 km	MPC · JPL
451550	2011 WV_{122}	—	November 5, 2007	Kitt Peak	Spacewatch	·	1.0 km	MPC · JPL
451551	2011 WF_{124}	—	October 28, 2011	Mount Lemmon	Mount Lemmon Survey	·	1.9 km	MPC · JPL
451552	2011 WU_{125}	—	November 24, 2003	Kitt Peak	Spacewatch	·	780 m	MPC · JPL
451553	2011 WV_{130}	—	November 16, 2011	Kitt Peak	Spacewatch	·	1.2 km	MPC · JPL
451554	2011 WJ_{135}	—	May 30, 2009	Mount Lemmon	Mount Lemmon Survey	·	2.0 km	MPC · JPL
451555	2011 WK_{135}	—	December 30, 2007	Kitt Peak	Spacewatch	(5)	1.1 km	MPC · JPL
451556	2011 WR_{135}	—	January 21, 1996	Kitt Peak	Spacewatch	·	1.3 km	MPC · JPL
451557	2011 WW_{140}	—	November 18, 2011	Mount Lemmon	Mount Lemmon Survey	·	1.2 km	MPC · JPL
451558	2011 YK_{1}	—	November 6, 2007	Mount Lemmon	Mount Lemmon Survey	EUN	1.2 km	MPC · JPL
451559	2011 YW_{7}	—	January 12, 2008	Mount Lemmon	Mount Lemmon Survey	·	1.7 km	MPC · JPL
451560	2011 YJ_{17}	—	November 26, 1998	Kitt Peak	Spacewatch	·	1.4 km	MPC · JPL
451561	2011 YT_{27}	—	September 17, 2010	Mount Lemmon	Mount Lemmon Survey	·	1.7 km	MPC · JPL
451562	2011 YM_{32}	—	February 8, 2008	Mount Lemmon	Mount Lemmon Survey	·	960 m	MPC · JPL
451563	2011 YB_{45}	—	September 27, 2006	Catalina	CSS	·	1.3 km	MPC · JPL
451564	2011 YT_{50}	—	November 2, 2007	Kitt Peak	Spacewatch	·	1.7 km	MPC · JPL
451565	2011 YD_{53}	—	November 27, 2011	Mount Lemmon	Mount Lemmon Survey	EOS	2.3 km	MPC · JPL
451566	2011 YJ_{68}	—	December 31, 2011	Kitt Peak	Spacewatch	·	1.9 km	MPC · JPL
451567	2011 YR_{68}	—	September 3, 2010	Socorro	LINEAR	·	2.7 km	MPC · JPL
451568	2011 YM_{69}	—	January 20, 2008	Mount Lemmon	Mount Lemmon Survey	·	1.7 km	MPC · JPL
451569	2011 YJ_{74}	—	January 24, 2004	Socorro	LINEAR	·	1.6 km	MPC · JPL
451570	2011 YZ_{76}	—	November 28, 2005	Kitt Peak	Spacewatch	·	3.7 km	MPC · JPL
451571	2011 YG_{77}	—	November 18, 2011	Mount Lemmon	Mount Lemmon Survey	·	1.7 km	MPC · JPL
451572	2011 YC_{78}	—	December 21, 2003	Kitt Peak	Spacewatch	·	1.5 km	MPC · JPL
451573	2011 YS_{78}	—	November 16, 2006	Catalina	CSS	·	1.8 km	MPC · JPL
451574	2012 AU	—	December 3, 2003	Anderson Mesa	LONEOS	·	1.3 km	MPC · JPL
451575	2012 AC_{2}	—	June 28, 2010	WISE	WISE	HOF	3.8 km	MPC · JPL
451576	2012 AU_{5}	—	December 27, 2011	Kitt Peak	Spacewatch	·	1.6 km	MPC · JPL
451577	2012 AR_{13}	—	September 25, 2006	Mount Lemmon	Mount Lemmon Survey	MIS	2.2 km	MPC · JPL
451578	2012 AE_{14}	—	March 23, 2007	Siding Spring	SSS	·	4.3 km	MPC · JPL
451579	2012 AV_{20}	—	February 10, 2008	Catalina	CSS	·	1.7 km	MPC · JPL
451580	2012 AC_{21}	—	November 27, 1998	Kitt Peak	Spacewatch	RAF	870 m	MPC · JPL
451581	2012 BH_{2}	—	October 22, 2006	Kitt Peak	Spacewatch	·	1.5 km	MPC · JPL
451582	2012 BQ_{4}	—	January 18, 2012	Kitt Peak	Spacewatch	·	1.4 km	MPC · JPL
451583	2012 BE_{9}	—	January 7, 2003	Socorro	LINEAR	·	1.7 km	MPC · JPL
451584	2012 BW_{10}	—	December 28, 2011	Mount Lemmon	Mount Lemmon Survey	·	4.0 km	MPC · JPL
451585	2012 BD_{29}	—	November 18, 2006	Kitt Peak	Spacewatch	HOF	2.6 km	MPC · JPL
451586	2012 BM_{30}	—	March 27, 2008	Mount Lemmon	Mount Lemmon Survey	AGN	1.1 km	MPC · JPL
451587	2012 BF_{43}	—	October 21, 2006	Mount Lemmon	Mount Lemmon Survey	·	1.2 km	MPC · JPL
451588	2012 BO_{58}	—	June 8, 2005	Kitt Peak	Spacewatch	·	2.3 km	MPC · JPL
451589	2012 BM_{59}	—	September 30, 2006	Catalina	CSS	·	1.7 km	MPC · JPL
451590	2012 BC_{67}	—	January 2, 2012	Mount Lemmon	Mount Lemmon Survey	·	2.2 km	MPC · JPL
451591	2012 BY_{71}	—	February 17, 2007	Mount Lemmon	Mount Lemmon Survey	EOS	2.1 km	MPC · JPL
451592	2012 BJ_{78}	—	September 3, 2010	Mount Lemmon	Mount Lemmon Survey	·	1.2 km	MPC · JPL
451593	2012 BQ_{98}	—	August 23, 2001	Kitt Peak	Spacewatch	DOR	1.9 km	MPC · JPL
451594	2012 BV_{119}	—	January 18, 2012	Kitt Peak	Spacewatch	·	1.2 km	MPC · JPL
451595	2012 BQ_{132}	—	November 11, 2006	Kitt Peak	Spacewatch	·	2.9 km	MPC · JPL
451596	2012 BF_{140}	—	January 31, 2012	Mount Lemmon	Mount Lemmon Survey	·	3.4 km	MPC · JPL
451597	2012 CP_{9}	—	February 1, 2012	Kitt Peak	Spacewatch	VER	2.2 km	MPC · JPL
451598	2012 CF_{21}	—	September 15, 2006	Kitt Peak	Spacewatch	·	1.1 km	MPC · JPL
451599	2012 CS_{36}	—	January 19, 2012	Kitt Peak	Spacewatch	·	1.8 km	MPC · JPL
451600	2012 CC_{37}	—	March 10, 2007	Kitt Peak	Spacewatch	·	1.9 km	MPC · JPL

== 451601–451700 ==
back to top

Designation			Discovery			Properties		Ref
Permanent	Provisional	Named after	Date	Site	Discoverer(s)	Category	Diam.	Ref
451601	2012 CD_{47}	—	September 19, 2009	Kitt Peak	Spacewatch	EOS	2.1 km	MPC · JPL
451602	2012 CC_{57}	—	October 11, 2010	Mount Lemmon	Mount Lemmon Survey	·	1.9 km	MPC · JPL
451603	2012 DQ_{2}	—	October 10, 2004	Kitt Peak	Spacewatch	·	2.6 km	MPC · JPL
451604	2012 DM_{10}	—	January 30, 2012	Kitt Peak	Spacewatch	·	1.8 km	MPC · JPL
451605	2012 DN_{12}	—	January 30, 2012	Kitt Peak	Spacewatch	·	1.9 km	MPC · JPL
451606	2012 DR_{13}	—	February 21, 2012	Mount Lemmon	Mount Lemmon Survey	·	3.0 km	MPC · JPL
451607	2012 DY_{14}	—	April 22, 2007	Catalina	CSS	·	3.7 km	MPC · JPL
451608	2012 DH_{17}	—	April 26, 2008	Kitt Peak	Spacewatch	·	2.1 km	MPC · JPL
451609	2012 DG_{18}	—	January 18, 2012	Kitt Peak	Spacewatch	·	2.5 km	MPC · JPL
451610	2012 DW_{24}	—	September 15, 2009	Kitt Peak	Spacewatch	·	3.5 km	MPC · JPL
451611	2012 DV_{39}	—	March 16, 2007	Kitt Peak	Spacewatch	·	2.2 km	MPC · JPL
451612	2012 DJ_{51}	—	December 28, 2005	Kitt Peak	Spacewatch	THM	1.8 km	MPC · JPL
451613	2012 DM_{57}	—	February 25, 2012	Mount Lemmon	Mount Lemmon Survey	EOS	1.7 km	MPC · JPL
451614	2012 DH_{77}	—	February 21, 2012	Kitt Peak	Spacewatch	·	2.0 km	MPC · JPL
451615	2012 DX_{84}	—	September 15, 2004	Kitt Peak	Spacewatch	·	1.7 km	MPC · JPL
451616	2012 DR_{88}	—	February 23, 2012	Mount Lemmon	Mount Lemmon Survey	·	3.1 km	MPC · JPL
451617	2012 DK_{96}	—	March 11, 2007	Mount Lemmon	Mount Lemmon Survey	·	1.6 km	MPC · JPL
451618	2012 EQ_{5}	—	January 27, 2012	Mount Lemmon	Mount Lemmon Survey	·	2.7 km	MPC · JPL
451619	2012 FQ_{14}	—	November 17, 2009	Mount Lemmon	Mount Lemmon Survey	·	3.5 km	MPC · JPL
451620	2012 FR_{21}	—	February 22, 2012	Kitt Peak	Spacewatch	·	2.4 km	MPC · JPL
451621	2012 FA_{33}	—	October 16, 2009	Mount Lemmon	Mount Lemmon Survey	THB	3.2 km	MPC · JPL
451622	2012 FJ_{45}	—	September 27, 2009	Kitt Peak	Spacewatch	·	2.4 km	MPC · JPL
451623	2012 FW_{58}	—	January 18, 2010	WISE	WISE	·	3.5 km	MPC · JPL
451624	2012 FY_{67}	—	September 18, 2009	Kitt Peak	Spacewatch	·	3.0 km	MPC · JPL
451625	2012 FR_{68}	—	October 10, 2004	Kitt Peak	Spacewatch	·	3.8 km	MPC · JPL
451626	2012 FN_{69}	—	March 26, 2007	Kitt Peak	Spacewatch	·	1.8 km	MPC · JPL
451627	2012 FV_{78}	—	June 8, 2007	Kitt Peak	Spacewatch	·	2.3 km	MPC · JPL
451628	2012 FX_{79}	—	October 7, 2004	Kitt Peak	Spacewatch	·	2.1 km	MPC · JPL
451629	2012 GH_{8}	—	October 15, 2009	Mount Lemmon	Mount Lemmon Survey	·	2.3 km	MPC · JPL
451630	2012 GR_{12}	—	December 3, 2010	Catalina	CSS	·	4.2 km	MPC · JPL
451631	2012 GL_{13}	—	October 16, 2009	Mount Lemmon	Mount Lemmon Survey	·	2.8 km	MPC · JPL
451632	2012 GB_{21}	—	September 22, 2009	Kitt Peak	Spacewatch	·	3.6 km	MPC · JPL
451633	2012 GR_{26}	—	March 14, 2012	Kitt Peak	Spacewatch	LIX	3.9 km	MPC · JPL
451634	2012 GR_{27}	—	February 20, 2001	Socorro	LINEAR	·	2.1 km	MPC · JPL
451635	2012 GD_{29}	—	October 14, 2009	Mount Lemmon	Mount Lemmon Survey	·	2.4 km	MPC · JPL
451636	2012 HP_{18}	—	February 27, 2006	Kitt Peak	Spacewatch	LIX	3.3 km	MPC · JPL
451637	2012 HW_{34}	—	September 25, 2009	Kitt Peak	Spacewatch	·	3.0 km	MPC · JPL
451638	2012 HF_{56}	—	January 26, 2006	Kitt Peak	Spacewatch	·	2.5 km	MPC · JPL
451639	2012 HR_{63}	—	December 8, 2004	Socorro	LINEAR	·	3.8 km	MPC · JPL
451640	2012 HT_{64}	—	November 11, 2004	Kitt Peak	Spacewatch	·	2.8 km	MPC · JPL
451641	2012 HX_{71}	—	January 27, 2006	Mount Lemmon	Mount Lemmon Survey	·	2.5 km	MPC · JPL
451642	2012 HO_{82}	—	April 25, 2003	Kitt Peak	Spacewatch	·	2.5 km	MPC · JPL
451643	2012 HA_{83}	—	March 9, 2006	Catalina	CSS	·	4.0 km	MPC · JPL
451644	2012 JJ_{16}	—	January 20, 2010	WISE	WISE	T_{j} (2.99)	3.8 km	MPC · JPL
451645	2012 JE_{25}	—	March 24, 2001	Anderson Mesa	LONEOS	·	2.8 km	MPC · JPL
451646	2012 JX_{60}	—	November 17, 2010	Mount Lemmon	Mount Lemmon Survey	LIX	3.2 km	MPC · JPL
451647	2012 JA_{66}	—	November 26, 2009	Mount Lemmon	Mount Lemmon Survey	·	4.1 km	MPC · JPL
451648	2012 KA_{37}	—	December 24, 2005	Kitt Peak	Spacewatch	·	1.8 km	MPC · JPL
451649	2012 PW_{18}	—	January 8, 2006	Mount Lemmon	Mount Lemmon Survey	H	620 m	MPC · JPL
451650	2012 SE_{16}	—	November 9, 2009	Mount Lemmon	Mount Lemmon Survey	·	550 m	MPC · JPL
451651	2012 SU_{30}	—	September 16, 2012	Catalina	CSS	H	610 m	MPC · JPL
451652	2012 TG_{129}	—	September 15, 2012	Kitt Peak	Spacewatch	H	530 m	MPC · JPL
451653	2012 UO_{57}	—	October 8, 2012	Kitt Peak	Spacewatch	·	730 m	MPC · JPL
451654	2012 UN_{151}	—	September 23, 2012	Mount Lemmon	Mount Lemmon Survey	·	570 m	MPC · JPL
451655	2012 VY_{75}	—	November 13, 2012	Mount Lemmon	Mount Lemmon Survey	·	630 m	MPC · JPL
451656	2012 WF_{29}	—	March 29, 2011	Kitt Peak	Spacewatch	·	690 m	MPC · JPL
451657	2012 WD_{36}	—	November 19, 2012	Cerro Tololo	DECam	SDO	162 km	MPC · JPL
451658	2012 XT_{67}	—	March 12, 2010	Kitt Peak	Spacewatch	·	1.0 km	MPC · JPL
451659	2012 XG_{105}	—	January 5, 2002	Kitt Peak	Spacewatch	·	1.8 km	MPC · JPL
451660	2012 XS_{151}	—	January 25, 2006	Kitt Peak	Spacewatch	V	730 m	MPC · JPL
451661	2012 XM_{152}	—	September 21, 2008	Kitt Peak	Spacewatch	·	860 m	MPC · JPL
451662	2013 AH_{9}	—	September 24, 2011	Mount Lemmon	Mount Lemmon Survey	·	1.4 km	MPC · JPL
451663	2013 AU_{12}	—	October 21, 2008	Kitt Peak	Spacewatch	·	1.0 km	MPC · JPL
451664	2013 AV_{31}	—	January 8, 2006	Mount Lemmon	Mount Lemmon Survey	·	850 m	MPC · JPL
451665	2013 AV_{38}	—	November 10, 2005	Kitt Peak	Spacewatch	·	630 m	MPC · JPL
451666	2013 AS_{58}	—	December 26, 2005	Kitt Peak	Spacewatch	·	920 m	MPC · JPL
451667	2013 AA_{59}	—	December 2, 2008	Kitt Peak	Spacewatch	·	1.1 km	MPC · JPL
451668	2013 AW_{70}	—	September 23, 2008	Mount Lemmon	Mount Lemmon Survey	·	690 m	MPC · JPL
451669	2013 AR_{80}	—	November 13, 2012	Mount Lemmon	Mount Lemmon Survey	·	710 m	MPC · JPL
451670	2013 AE_{89}	—	September 3, 2008	Kitt Peak	Spacewatch	·	670 m	MPC · JPL
451671	2013 AT_{89}	—	October 10, 2008	Mount Lemmon	Mount Lemmon Survey	·	1.8 km	MPC · JPL
451672	2013 AG_{99}	—	January 20, 2009	Catalina	CSS	·	1.4 km	MPC · JPL
451673	2013 AE_{100}	—	August 24, 2007	Kitt Peak	Spacewatch	V	720 m	MPC · JPL
451674	2013 AQ_{104}	—	December 2, 2005	Mount Lemmon	Mount Lemmon Survey	·	970 m	MPC · JPL
451675	2013 AZ_{106}	—	October 25, 2008	Kitt Peak	Spacewatch	·	840 m	MPC · JPL
451676	2013 AC_{116}	—	March 13, 2010	Mount Lemmon	Mount Lemmon Survey	·	600 m	MPC · JPL
451677	2013 AO_{126}	—	February 6, 2010	Kitt Peak	Spacewatch	(1338) (FLO)	700 m	MPC · JPL
451678	2013 AT_{136}	—	February 7, 2006	Kitt Peak	Spacewatch	·	1.8 km	MPC · JPL
451679	2013 AZ_{166}	—	June 16, 2010	Mount Lemmon	Mount Lemmon Survey	·	1.1 km	MPC · JPL
451680	2013 BN_{9}	—	December 5, 2008	Kitt Peak	Spacewatch	·	1.4 km	MPC · JPL
451681	2013 BJ_{12}	—	December 5, 2008	Kitt Peak	Spacewatch	V	560 m	MPC · JPL
451682	2013 BK_{22}	—	July 18, 2007	Mount Lemmon	Mount Lemmon Survey	·	1.5 km	MPC · JPL
451683	2013 BA_{49}	—	December 29, 2008	Kitt Peak	Spacewatch	·	1.3 km	MPC · JPL
451684	2013 BV_{63}	—	January 31, 2006	Kitt Peak	Spacewatch	·	590 m	MPC · JPL
451685	2013 BK_{66}	—	January 9, 2013	Kitt Peak	Spacewatch	·	1.5 km	MPC · JPL
451686	2013 BR_{67}	—	November 30, 2008	Mount Lemmon	Mount Lemmon Survey	·	1.0 km	MPC · JPL
451687	2013 BF_{68}	—	December 5, 2008	Kitt Peak	Spacewatch	·	1.2 km	MPC · JPL
451688	2013 BV_{71}	—	December 6, 2005	Kitt Peak	Spacewatch	·	780 m	MPC · JPL
451689	2013 BB_{76}	—	February 22, 2010	WISE	WISE	·	2.1 km	MPC · JPL
451690	2013 CC_{6}	—	January 5, 2013	Kitt Peak	Spacewatch	·	1.1 km	MPC · JPL
451691	2013 CG_{6}	—	February 27, 2006	Mount Lemmon	Mount Lemmon Survey	NYS	760 m	MPC · JPL
451692	2013 CO_{9}	—	October 27, 2008	Kitt Peak	Spacewatch	·	850 m	MPC · JPL
451693	2013 CO_{11}	—	January 25, 2006	Kitt Peak	Spacewatch	·	530 m	MPC · JPL
451694	2013 CG_{22}	—	April 10, 2010	Mount Lemmon	Mount Lemmon Survey	·	690 m	MPC · JPL
451695	2013 CL_{29}	—	January 1, 2009	Mount Lemmon	Mount Lemmon Survey	·	1.3 km	MPC · JPL
451696	2013 CH_{34}	—	December 12, 2012	Kitt Peak	Spacewatch	·	650 m	MPC · JPL
451697	2013 CC_{39}	—	December 23, 2001	Kitt Peak	Spacewatch	V	570 m	MPC · JPL
451698	2013 CZ_{41}	—	September 12, 2004	Kitt Peak	Spacewatch	·	830 m	MPC · JPL
451699	2013 CX_{49}	—	September 25, 2008	Mount Lemmon	Mount Lemmon Survey	·	630 m	MPC · JPL
451700	2013 CY_{60}	—	March 1, 2009	Mount Lemmon	Mount Lemmon Survey	·	1.3 km	MPC · JPL

== 451701–451800 ==
back to top

Designation			Discovery			Properties		Ref
Permanent	Provisional	Named after	Date	Site	Discoverer(s)	Category	Diam.	Ref
451701	2013 CL_{65}	—	December 21, 2008	Kitt Peak	Spacewatch	·	1.1 km	MPC · JPL
451702	2013 CN_{66}	—	March 10, 2005	Mount Lemmon	Mount Lemmon Survey	·	990 m	MPC · JPL
451703	2013 CC_{67}	—	October 30, 2008	Mount Lemmon	Mount Lemmon Survey	·	560 m	MPC · JPL
451704	2013 CL_{72}	—	November 18, 2011	Mount Lemmon	Mount Lemmon Survey	·	1.7 km	MPC · JPL
451705	2013 CN_{73}	—	January 7, 2013	Kitt Peak	Spacewatch	·	1.2 km	MPC · JPL
451706	2013 CN_{89}	—	February 6, 2013	Kitt Peak	Spacewatch	MAR	970 m	MPC · JPL
451707	2013 CL_{106}	—	December 2, 2008	Kitt Peak	Spacewatch	·	910 m	MPC · JPL
451708	2013 CZ_{107}	—	October 19, 2011	Mount Lemmon	Mount Lemmon Survey	·	1.1 km	MPC · JPL
451709	2013 CN_{116}	—	December 19, 2007	Kitt Peak	Spacewatch	·	1.4 km	MPC · JPL
451710	2013 CF_{118}	—	November 3, 2011	Mount Lemmon	Mount Lemmon Survey	·	1.4 km	MPC · JPL
451711	2013 CC_{119}	—	October 8, 2008	Mount Lemmon	Mount Lemmon Survey	·	840 m	MPC · JPL
451712	2013 CB_{127}	—	October 7, 2004	Kitt Peak	Spacewatch	·	1.5 km	MPC · JPL
451713	2013 CE_{132}	—	October 25, 2008	Kitt Peak	Spacewatch	·	730 m	MPC · JPL
451714	2013 CO_{147}	—	January 11, 2002	Kitt Peak	Spacewatch	MAS	690 m	MPC · JPL
451715	2013 CV_{161}	—	December 22, 2008	Mount Lemmon	Mount Lemmon Survey	MAS	610 m	MPC · JPL
451716	2013 CE_{171}	—	November 18, 2008	Kitt Peak	Spacewatch	·	770 m	MPC · JPL
451717	2013 CZ_{175}	—	February 13, 2002	Kitt Peak	Spacewatch	V	580 m	MPC · JPL
451718	2013 CB_{179}	—	September 7, 2011	Kitt Peak	Spacewatch	·	1.2 km	MPC · JPL
451719	2013 CC_{179}	—	February 7, 2002	Kitt Peak	Spacewatch	·	1.1 km	MPC · JPL
451720	2013 CL_{184}	—	December 31, 2008	Mount Lemmon	Mount Lemmon Survey	·	840 m	MPC · JPL
451721	2013 CO_{186}	—	January 4, 2006	Mount Lemmon	Mount Lemmon Survey	·	600 m	MPC · JPL
451722	2013 CA_{209}	—	February 1, 2013	Kitt Peak	Spacewatch	·	1.2 km	MPC · JPL
451723	2013 CD_{216}	—	January 15, 2008	Mount Lemmon	Mount Lemmon Survey	·	1.8 km	MPC · JPL
451724	2013 CS_{219}	—	January 16, 2009	Mount Lemmon	Mount Lemmon Survey	·	1.1 km	MPC · JPL
451725	2013 DE_{10}	—	September 10, 2007	Kitt Peak	Spacewatch	·	1.4 km	MPC · JPL
451726	2013 DH_{14}	—	September 19, 2006	Kitt Peak	Spacewatch	·	1.9 km	MPC · JPL
451727	2013 EY_{6}	—	March 8, 2005	Mount Lemmon	Mount Lemmon Survey	·	1.4 km	MPC · JPL
451728	2013 EP_{7}	—	September 24, 2004	Kitt Peak	Spacewatch	·	970 m	MPC · JPL
451729	2013 ED_{8}	—	January 25, 2009	Kitt Peak	Spacewatch	·	1.4 km	MPC · JPL
451730	2013 EZ_{14}	—	December 29, 2008	Kitt Peak	Spacewatch	MAS	680 m	MPC · JPL
451731	2013 EZ_{19}	—	October 23, 2011	Haleakala	Pan-STARRS 1	PHO	1.1 km	MPC · JPL
451732	2013 EX_{20}	—	March 25, 2006	Kitt Peak	Spacewatch	CLA	1.6 km	MPC · JPL
451733	2013 EP_{21}	—	December 29, 2008	Mount Lemmon	Mount Lemmon Survey	·	990 m	MPC · JPL
451734	2013 EC_{23}	—	September 27, 2006	Mount Lemmon	Mount Lemmon Survey	DOR	2.6 km	MPC · JPL
451735	2013 EQ_{24}	—	December 10, 2004	Kitt Peak	Spacewatch	·	1.1 km	MPC · JPL
451736	2013 ES_{24}	—	March 5, 2013	Kitt Peak	Spacewatch	·	1.1 km	MPC · JPL
451737	2013 EH_{25}	—	October 2, 2006	Mount Lemmon	Mount Lemmon Survey	·	2.0 km	MPC · JPL
451738	2013 EP_{26}	—	April 26, 2006	Kitt Peak	Spacewatch	·	970 m	MPC · JPL
451739	2013 EH_{32}	—	April 17, 2009	Kitt Peak	Spacewatch	WIT	910 m	MPC · JPL
451740	2013 EA_{38}	—	February 16, 2013	Kitt Peak	Spacewatch	·	1.1 km	MPC · JPL
451741	2013 EO_{38}	—	March 1, 2009	Kitt Peak	Spacewatch	·	1.0 km	MPC · JPL
451742	2013 ER_{40}	—	January 26, 2006	Catalina	CSS	V	780 m	MPC · JPL
451743	2013 EO_{45}	—	January 20, 2009	Catalina	CSS	·	1.1 km	MPC · JPL
451744	2013 EG_{58}	—	October 22, 2011	Kitt Peak	Spacewatch	·	1.5 km	MPC · JPL
451745	2013 EA_{64}	—	November 17, 1998	Kitt Peak	Spacewatch	·	1.4 km	MPC · JPL
451746	2013 EH_{67}	—	January 31, 2009	Mount Lemmon	Mount Lemmon Survey	·	1.0 km	MPC · JPL
451747	2013 EE_{75}	—	May 7, 2005	Mount Lemmon	Mount Lemmon Survey	·	1.3 km	MPC · JPL
451748	2013 EC_{83}	—	March 5, 2008	Mount Lemmon	Mount Lemmon Survey	·	1.8 km	MPC · JPL
451749	2013 EQ_{85}	—	April 2, 2006	Kitt Peak	Spacewatch	ERI	1.5 km	MPC · JPL
451750	2013 EG_{88}	—	April 23, 2009	Mount Lemmon	Mount Lemmon Survey	·	1.7 km	MPC · JPL
451751	2013 EM_{92}	—	November 13, 2007	Mount Lemmon	Mount Lemmon Survey	·	1.3 km	MPC · JPL
451752	2013 EF_{93}	—	December 19, 2003	Kitt Peak	Spacewatch	·	1.9 km	MPC · JPL
451753	2013 EP_{97}	—	January 18, 2009	Kitt Peak	Spacewatch	·	1.2 km	MPC · JPL
451754	2013 EG_{101}	—	December 18, 2001	Kitt Peak	Spacewatch	·	690 m	MPC · JPL
451755	2013 ET_{104}	—	January 16, 2009	Kitt Peak	Spacewatch	·	1.1 km	MPC · JPL
451756	2013 EL_{105}	—	September 26, 2011	Mount Lemmon	Mount Lemmon Survey	·	1.3 km	MPC · JPL
451757	2013 ER_{106}	—	October 12, 2007	Mount Lemmon	Mount Lemmon Survey	·	1 km	MPC · JPL
451758	2013 EW_{113}	—	November 17, 2006	Mount Lemmon	Mount Lemmon Survey	DOR	2.4 km	MPC · JPL
451759	2013 EH_{121}	—	February 28, 2009	Mount Lemmon	Mount Lemmon Survey	·	970 m	MPC · JPL
451760	2013 ED_{122}	—	October 13, 2007	Mount Lemmon	Mount Lemmon Survey	·	1.1 km	MPC · JPL
451761	2013 FE_{1}	—	October 10, 2004	Kitt Peak	Spacewatch	·	3.1 km	MPC · JPL
451762	2013 FA_{7}	—	March 9, 2008	Mount Lemmon	Mount Lemmon Survey	·	2.0 km	MPC · JPL
451763	2013 FO_{11}	—	June 17, 2009	Kitt Peak	Spacewatch	EOS	1.7 km	MPC · JPL
451764	2013 FK_{18}	—	October 27, 2006	Mount Lemmon	Mount Lemmon Survey	·	1.5 km	MPC · JPL
451765	2013 FU_{21}	—	March 10, 2005	Mount Lemmon	Mount Lemmon Survey	MAR	1.1 km	MPC · JPL
451766	2013 FY_{24}	—	March 9, 2007	Mount Lemmon	Mount Lemmon Survey	·	3.4 km	MPC · JPL
451767	2013 FP_{26}	—	July 22, 2006	Mount Lemmon	Mount Lemmon Survey	·	1.5 km	MPC · JPL
451768	2013 FU_{26}	—	November 2, 2007	Kitt Peak	Spacewatch	·	1 km	MPC · JPL
451769	2013 GB_{4}	—	December 3, 2008	Mount Lemmon	Mount Lemmon Survey	·	1.1 km	MPC · JPL
451770	2013 GB_{13}	—	April 2, 2009	Mount Lemmon	Mount Lemmon Survey	EUN	1.2 km	MPC · JPL
451771	2013 GJ_{19}	—	April 12, 2005	Mount Lemmon	Mount Lemmon Survey	·	1.5 km	MPC · JPL
451772	2013 GP_{24}	—	May 3, 2008	Mount Lemmon	Mount Lemmon Survey	·	2.3 km	MPC · JPL
451773	2013 GU_{36}	—	January 14, 2008	Kitt Peak	Spacewatch	·	2.0 km	MPC · JPL
451774	2013 GL_{62}	—	October 23, 2006	Kitt Peak	Spacewatch	·	1.3 km	MPC · JPL
451775	2013 GA_{64}	—	April 7, 2006	Kitt Peak	Spacewatch	PHO	2.5 km	MPC · JPL
451776	2013 GN_{71}	—	March 13, 2007	Mount Lemmon	Mount Lemmon Survey	·	2.5 km	MPC · JPL
451777	2013 GW_{85}	—	April 17, 2009	Catalina	CSS	·	1.2 km	MPC · JPL
451778	2013 GM_{91}	—	December 11, 2004	Campo Imperatore	CINEOS	·	1.3 km	MPC · JPL
451779	2013 GG_{92}	—	March 17, 2007	Catalina	CSS	T_{j} (2.99)	5.1 km	MPC · JPL
451780	2013 GP_{92}	—	January 28, 2004	Socorro	LINEAR	·	1.7 km	MPC · JPL
451781	2013 GC_{97}	—	September 21, 2009	Mount Lemmon	Mount Lemmon Survey	·	2.3 km	MPC · JPL
451782	2013 GJ_{100}	—	September 11, 2010	Mount Lemmon	Mount Lemmon Survey	·	4.3 km	MPC · JPL
451783	2013 GW_{100}	—	September 25, 2009	Kitt Peak	Spacewatch	T_{j} (2.99)	3.2 km	MPC · JPL
451784	2013 GK_{109}	—	January 16, 2008	Mount Lemmon	Mount Lemmon Survey	·	1.7 km	MPC · JPL
451785	2013 GJ_{113}	—	October 30, 2010	Kitt Peak	Spacewatch	·	3.5 km	MPC · JPL
451786	2013 GR_{123}	—	December 13, 2007	Socorro	LINEAR	·	1.2 km	MPC · JPL
451787	2013 GD_{124}	—	October 14, 2010	Mount Lemmon	Mount Lemmon Survey	·	1.9 km	MPC · JPL
451788	2013 GV_{124}	—	February 13, 2008	Kitt Peak	Spacewatch	AGN	1.0 km	MPC · JPL
451789	2013 GN_{129}	—	September 18, 2003	Kitt Peak	Spacewatch	·	1.2 km	MPC · JPL
451790	2013 GY_{132}	—	November 11, 2006	Mount Lemmon	Mount Lemmon Survey	AST	1.5 km	MPC · JPL
451791	2013 GH_{136}	—	April 14, 2013	Mount Lemmon	Mount Lemmon Survey	EOS	2.4 km	MPC · JPL
451792	2013 HC_{5}	—	October 15, 2004	Kitt Peak	Spacewatch	·	4.1 km	MPC · JPL
451793	2013 HG_{9}	—	February 3, 2008	Kitt Peak	Spacewatch	·	2.7 km	MPC · JPL
451794	2013 HA_{10}	—	March 1, 2008	Mount Lemmon	Mount Lemmon Survey	·	1.7 km	MPC · JPL
451795	2013 HS_{17}	—	February 12, 2012	Mount Lemmon	Mount Lemmon Survey	·	2.7 km	MPC · JPL
451796	2013 HU_{19}	—	January 18, 2008	Mount Lemmon	Mount Lemmon Survey	·	1.6 km	MPC · JPL
451797	2013 HH_{21}	—	October 29, 2010	Mount Lemmon	Mount Lemmon Survey	·	3.3 km	MPC · JPL
451798	2013 HT_{23}	—	April 5, 2000	Socorro	LINEAR	·	1.9 km	MPC · JPL
451799	2013 HP_{27}	—	September 27, 2006	Kitt Peak	Spacewatch	·	1.5 km	MPC · JPL
451800	2013 HJ_{29}	—	November 25, 2005	Kitt Peak	Spacewatch	·	2.4 km	MPC · JPL

== 451801–451900 ==
back to top

Designation			Discovery			Properties		Ref
Permanent	Provisional	Named after	Date	Site	Discoverer(s)	Category	Diam.	Ref
451801	2013 HA_{30}	—	May 14, 2008	Mount Lemmon	Mount Lemmon Survey	·	3.6 km	MPC · JPL
451802	2013 HM_{30}	—	September 21, 2009	Mount Lemmon	Mount Lemmon Survey	·	2.5 km	MPC · JPL
451803	2013 HM_{32}	—	September 25, 2000	Kitt Peak	Spacewatch	BRA	1.6 km	MPC · JPL
451804	2013 HT_{42}	—	November 25, 2006	Kitt Peak	Spacewatch	PAD	1.5 km	MPC · JPL
451805	2013 HB_{43}	—	September 10, 2010	Mount Lemmon	Mount Lemmon Survey	·	1.5 km	MPC · JPL
451806	2013 HH_{43}	—	December 15, 2006	Kitt Peak	Spacewatch	·	1.5 km	MPC · JPL
451807	2013 HQ_{43}	—	March 6, 2008	Mount Lemmon	Mount Lemmon Survey	·	1.4 km	MPC · JPL
451808	2013 HM_{46}	—	January 19, 2004	Kitt Peak	Spacewatch	(5)	1 km	MPC · JPL
451809	2013 HX_{47}	—	September 22, 2009	Kitt Peak	Spacewatch	·	1.9 km	MPC · JPL
451810	2013 HQ_{55}	—	September 22, 2009	Kitt Peak	Spacewatch	LIX	2.6 km	MPC · JPL
451811	2013 HD_{56}	—	October 19, 2006	Kitt Peak	Spacewatch	·	1.4 km	MPC · JPL
451812	2013 HK_{56}	—	February 8, 2008	Kitt Peak	Spacewatch	·	1.8 km	MPC · JPL
451813	2013 HH_{61}	—	November 2, 2007	Kitt Peak	Spacewatch	·	1.0 km	MPC · JPL
451814	2013 HM_{61}	—	September 28, 2006	Mount Lemmon	Mount Lemmon Survey	·	1.6 km	MPC · JPL
451815	2013 HO_{61}	—	September 15, 2010	Kitt Peak	Spacewatch	HOF	2.1 km	MPC · JPL
451816	2013 HL_{67}	—	October 17, 2010	Mount Lemmon	Mount Lemmon Survey	·	2.3 km	MPC · JPL
451817	2013 HZ_{88}	—	February 12, 2008	Kitt Peak	Spacewatch	·	1.6 km	MPC · JPL
451818	2013 HW_{90}	—	September 8, 2010	Kitt Peak	Spacewatch	·	1.6 km	MPC · JPL
451819	2013 HR_{95}	—	April 15, 2008	Mount Lemmon	Mount Lemmon Survey	·	2.2 km	MPC · JPL
451820	2013 HJ_{104}	—	December 16, 2007	Mount Lemmon	Mount Lemmon Survey	·	1.1 km	MPC · JPL
451821	2013 HK_{115}	—	September 15, 2010	Kitt Peak	Spacewatch	·	1.4 km	MPC · JPL
451822	2013 HY_{116}	—	August 16, 2009	Kitt Peak	Spacewatch	THM	1.8 km	MPC · JPL
451823	2013 HL_{117}	—	November 2, 2010	Mount Lemmon	Mount Lemmon Survey	KOR	1.1 km	MPC · JPL
451824	2013 HL_{119}	—	October 22, 2006	Kitt Peak	Spacewatch	·	1.2 km	MPC · JPL
451825	2013 HA_{122}	—	November 27, 2006	Kitt Peak	Spacewatch	·	1.4 km	MPC · JPL
451826	2013 HL_{131}	—	October 31, 2006	Mount Lemmon	Mount Lemmon Survey	·	1.4 km	MPC · JPL
451827	2013 HY_{132}	—	February 18, 2008	Mount Lemmon	Mount Lemmon Survey	·	1.8 km	MPC · JPL
451828	2013 HC_{150}	—	October 3, 2010	Kitt Peak	Spacewatch	·	1.5 km	MPC · JPL
451829	2013 JG_{5}	—	May 9, 2002	Socorro	LINEAR	·	4.4 km	MPC · JPL
451830	2013 JC_{8}	—	April 11, 2013	Kitt Peak	Spacewatch	·	3.6 km	MPC · JPL
451831	2013 JB_{9}	—	November 10, 2010	Mount Lemmon	Mount Lemmon Survey	·	3.4 km	MPC · JPL
451832	2013 JU_{11}	—	May 4, 2013	Mount Lemmon	Mount Lemmon Survey	·	2.5 km	MPC · JPL
451833	2013 JF_{13}	—	December 13, 2010	Mount Lemmon	Mount Lemmon Survey	·	2.7 km	MPC · JPL
451834	2013 JO_{18}	—	November 17, 2001	Kitt Peak	Spacewatch	·	1.9 km	MPC · JPL
451835	2013 JL_{20}	—	February 6, 2000	Socorro	LINEAR	·	1.4 km	MPC · JPL
451836	2013 JW_{29}	—	October 24, 2011	Mount Lemmon	Mount Lemmon Survey	·	1.7 km	MPC · JPL
451837	2013 JV_{32}	—	January 28, 2003	Socorro	LINEAR	·	1.8 km	MPC · JPL
451838	2013 JL_{36}	—	January 28, 2007	Kitt Peak	Spacewatch	·	3.0 km	MPC · JPL
451839	2013 JT_{40}	—	April 13, 2013	Kitt Peak	Spacewatch	·	3.1 km	MPC · JPL
451840	2013 JM_{41}	—	December 2, 2010	Kitt Peak	Spacewatch	·	3.2 km	MPC · JPL
451841	2013 KR_{2}	—	August 29, 2006	Kitt Peak	Spacewatch	·	1.7 km	MPC · JPL
451842	2013 KV_{9}	—	September 16, 2009	Mount Lemmon	Mount Lemmon Survey	·	2.3 km	MPC · JPL
451843	2013 KD_{11}	—	May 15, 2004	Socorro	LINEAR	·	2.2 km	MPC · JPL
451844	2013 KL_{14}	—	November 12, 2006	Mount Lemmon	Mount Lemmon Survey	·	1.8 km	MPC · JPL
451845	2013 LW_{3}	—	November 30, 2010	Mount Lemmon	Mount Lemmon Survey	EOS	2.1 km	MPC · JPL
451846	2013 LK_{5}	—	March 25, 2007	Mount Lemmon	Mount Lemmon Survey	·	3.2 km	MPC · JPL
451847	2013 LQ_{10}	—	December 4, 2010	Mount Lemmon	Mount Lemmon Survey	EOS	2.3 km	MPC · JPL
451848	2013 LG_{18}	—	October 16, 2006	Kitt Peak	Spacewatch	·	1.6 km	MPC · JPL
451849	2013 MD_{2}	—	March 26, 2007	Kitt Peak	Spacewatch	·	2.9 km	MPC · JPL
451850	2014 AT_{32}	—	February 20, 2009	Siding Spring	SSS	H	720 m	MPC · JPL
451851	2014 BK_{38}	—	January 10, 2007	Kitt Peak	Spacewatch	·	870 m	MPC · JPL
451852	2014 CE_{9}	—	January 26, 2006	Catalina	CSS	H	690 m	MPC · JPL
451853	2014 DF_{11}	—	February 24, 2006	Kitt Peak	Spacewatch	H	600 m	MPC · JPL
451854	2014 DR_{50}	—	August 18, 2006	Kitt Peak	Spacewatch	GEF	1.5 km	MPC · JPL
451855	2014 DD_{74}	—	April 23, 2001	Prescott	P. G. Comba	·	810 m	MPC · JPL
451856	2014 DM_{110}	—	September 8, 2004	Campo Imperatore	CINEOS	·	1.1 km	MPC · JPL
451857	2014 FM	—	September 10, 2010	Kitt Peak	Spacewatch	H	380 m	MPC · JPL
451858	2014 FB_{56}	—	May 9, 2000	Kitt Peak	Spacewatch	·	650 m	MPC · JPL
451859	2014 FD_{68}	—	September 12, 2004	Socorro	LINEAR	·	1.2 km	MPC · JPL
451860	2014 GY_{11}	—	October 6, 2008	Mount Lemmon	Mount Lemmon Survey	BAP	960 m	MPC · JPL
451861	2014 GM_{17}	—	April 25, 2006	Kitt Peak	Spacewatch	H	450 m	MPC · JPL
451862	2014 GN_{38}	—	April 23, 2007	Kitt Peak	Spacewatch	·	910 m	MPC · JPL
451863	2014 HX_{1}	—	April 4, 2005	Catalina	CSS	·	1.2 km	MPC · JPL
451864	2014 HZ_{2}	—	December 4, 2007	Catalina	CSS	H	510 m	MPC · JPL
451865	2014 HB_{14}	—	December 6, 2012	Mount Lemmon	Mount Lemmon Survey	·	670 m	MPC · JPL
451866	2014 HE_{15}	—	September 3, 2007	Catalina	CSS	·	990 m	MPC · JPL
451867	2014 HP_{17}	—	September 18, 1995	Kitt Peak	Spacewatch	·	800 m	MPC · JPL
451868	2014 HU_{19}	—	June 20, 2006	Mount Lemmon	Mount Lemmon Survey	MIS	2.9 km	MPC · JPL
451869	2014 HV_{21}	—	March 10, 2007	Mount Lemmon	Mount Lemmon Survey	·	490 m	MPC · JPL
451870	2014 HK_{23}	—	July 30, 2008	Kitt Peak	Spacewatch	·	610 m	MPC · JPL
451871	2014 HP_{32}	—	May 7, 2007	Kitt Peak	Spacewatch	·	950 m	MPC · JPL
451872	2014 HS_{33}	—	October 12, 2007	Mount Lemmon	Mount Lemmon Survey	·	1.0 km	MPC · JPL
451873	2014 HS_{37}	—	March 28, 2014	Mount Lemmon	Mount Lemmon Survey	·	1.4 km	MPC · JPL
451874	2014 HH_{41}	—	March 9, 2007	Kitt Peak	Spacewatch	·	680 m	MPC · JPL
451875	2014 HS_{41}	—	February 1, 2006	Mount Lemmon	Mount Lemmon Survey	NYS	1.1 km	MPC · JPL
451876	2014 HR_{44}	—	April 15, 2010	Kitt Peak	Spacewatch	(194)	1.2 km	MPC · JPL
451877	2014 HF_{45}	—	September 21, 2011	Mount Lemmon	Mount Lemmon Survey	MAS	760 m	MPC · JPL
451878	2014 HH_{45}	—	August 30, 2005	Kitt Peak	Spacewatch	·	680 m	MPC · JPL
451879	2014 HL_{76}	—	October 13, 2010	Kitt Peak	Spacewatch	·	1.9 km	MPC · JPL
451880	2014 HD_{77}	—	September 10, 2007	Mount Lemmon	Mount Lemmon Survey	NYS	950 m	MPC · JPL
451881	2014 HO_{103}	—	February 2, 2006	Mount Lemmon	Mount Lemmon Survey	NYS	1.3 km	MPC · JPL
451882	2014 HF_{186}	—	April 20, 2007	Kitt Peak	Spacewatch	·	830 m	MPC · JPL
451883	2014 HO_{188}	—	January 2, 2009	Mount Lemmon	Mount Lemmon Survey	·	1.2 km	MPC · JPL
451884	2014 JD_{3}	—	September 14, 2005	Kitt Peak	Spacewatch	·	580 m	MPC · JPL
451885	2014 JO_{7}	—	December 21, 2012	Mount Lemmon	Mount Lemmon Survey	·	1.3 km	MPC · JPL
451886	2014 JZ_{19}	—	February 17, 2010	Mount Lemmon	Mount Lemmon Survey	·	750 m	MPC · JPL
451887	2014 JT_{22}	—	October 20, 2011	Mount Lemmon	Mount Lemmon Survey	·	1.1 km	MPC · JPL
451888	2014 JU_{30}	—	April 24, 2009	Kitt Peak	Spacewatch	H	410 m	MPC · JPL
451889	2014 JO_{36}	—	March 14, 2007	Kitt Peak	Spacewatch	·	630 m	MPC · JPL
451890	2014 JP_{36}	—	February 17, 2010	Kitt Peak	Spacewatch	NYS	1.1 km	MPC · JPL
451891	2014 JB_{37}	—	May 3, 1997	Kitt Peak	Spacewatch	·	650 m	MPC · JPL
451892	2014 JS_{39}	—	November 20, 2009	Mount Lemmon	Mount Lemmon Survey	·	680 m	MPC · JPL
451893	2014 JU_{41}	—	September 17, 2006	Kitt Peak	Spacewatch	·	1.3 km	MPC · JPL
451894	2014 JU_{43}	—	May 11, 2007	Mount Lemmon	Mount Lemmon Survey	V	550 m	MPC · JPL
451895	2014 JG_{52}	—	April 25, 2003	Kitt Peak	Spacewatch	MAS	720 m	MPC · JPL
451896	2014 JN_{54}	—	October 7, 2004	Siding Spring	SSS	·	1.4 km	MPC · JPL
451897	2014 JP_{55}	—	October 18, 1999	Kitt Peak	Spacewatch	H	590 m	MPC · JPL
451898	2014 JY_{62}	—	April 20, 2010	Mount Lemmon	Mount Lemmon Survey	·	1.3 km	MPC · JPL
451899	2014 JM_{65}	—	June 14, 2010	Mount Lemmon	Mount Lemmon Survey	·	1.4 km	MPC · JPL
451900	2014 JD_{66}	—	November 7, 2008	Mount Lemmon	Mount Lemmon Survey	·	1.3 km	MPC · JPL

== 451901–452000 ==
back to top

Designation			Discovery			Properties		Ref
Permanent	Provisional	Named after	Date	Site	Discoverer(s)	Category	Diam.	Ref
451901	2014 JG_{73}	—	April 16, 2001	Kitt Peak	Spacewatch	·	620 m	MPC · JPL
451902	2014 JZ_{75}	—	August 31, 2005	Kitt Peak	Spacewatch	·	670 m	MPC · JPL
451903	2014 JS_{77}	—	November 24, 2008	Kitt Peak	Spacewatch	·	860 m	MPC · JPL
451904	2014 KF_{6}	—	September 9, 2011	Kitt Peak	Spacewatch	MAS	720 m	MPC · JPL
451905	2014 KE_{8}	—	September 10, 2007	Mount Lemmon	Mount Lemmon Survey	MAS	660 m	MPC · JPL
451906	2014 KV_{8}	—	January 7, 2013	Mount Lemmon	Mount Lemmon Survey	·	690 m	MPC · JPL
451907	2014 KO_{18}	—	June 17, 2010	Mount Lemmon	Mount Lemmon Survey	·	1.0 km	MPC · JPL
451908	2014 KU_{21}	—	February 10, 2011	Catalina	CSS	H	560 m	MPC · JPL
451909	2014 KW_{24}	—	October 20, 2011	Mount Lemmon	Mount Lemmon Survey	·	1.7 km	MPC · JPL
451910	2014 KG_{26}	—	April 14, 2010	Kitt Peak	Spacewatch	·	1.1 km	MPC · JPL
451911	2014 KQ_{27}	—	May 31, 2010	WISE	WISE	PHO	2.2 km	MPC · JPL
451912	2014 KQ_{33}	—	June 4, 2011	Mount Lemmon	Mount Lemmon Survey	·	820 m	MPC · JPL
451913	2014 KY_{33}	—	January 11, 2008	Kitt Peak	Spacewatch	(18466)	2.3 km	MPC · JPL
451914	2014 KU_{38}	—	June 15, 2010	Siding Spring	SSS	·	1.9 km	MPC · JPL
451915	2014 KV_{53}	—	May 2, 2014	Mount Lemmon	Mount Lemmon Survey	·	2.0 km	MPC · JPL
451916	2014 KE_{55}	—	September 29, 2003	Kitt Peak	Spacewatch	·	890 m	MPC · JPL
451917	2014 KZ_{61}	—	November 3, 2005	Mount Lemmon	Mount Lemmon Survey	·	2.7 km	MPC · JPL
451918	2014 KM_{64}	—	February 17, 2010	Kitt Peak	Spacewatch	NYS	880 m	MPC · JPL
451919	2014 KY_{65}	—	March 21, 2010	Kitt Peak	Spacewatch	MAS	740 m	MPC · JPL
451920	2014 KD_{75}	—	March 20, 2010	Kitt Peak	Spacewatch	·	1.3 km	MPC · JPL
451921	2014 KF_{76}	—	January 13, 2003	Socorro	LINEAR	H	710 m	MPC · JPL
451922	2014 KJ_{80}	—	March 12, 2007	Catalina	CSS	·	740 m	MPC · JPL
451923	2014 KK_{81}	—	January 4, 2013	Mount Lemmon	Mount Lemmon Survey	·	840 m	MPC · JPL
451924	2014 KP_{85}	—	October 24, 2011	Mount Lemmon	Mount Lemmon Survey	NYS	1.1 km	MPC · JPL
451925	2014 KK_{89}	—	June 19, 2010	Mount Lemmon	Mount Lemmon Survey	·	1.6 km	MPC · JPL
451926	2014 KP_{90}	—	October 22, 2009	Catalina	CSS	·	4.1 km	MPC · JPL
451927	2014 KX_{93}	—	November 27, 2006	Kitt Peak	Spacewatch	·	1.8 km	MPC · JPL
451928	2014 LO_{4}	—	September 22, 2011	Kitt Peak	Spacewatch	·	1.3 km	MPC · JPL
451929	2014 LF_{12}	—	March 11, 2007	Catalina	CSS	·	2.2 km	MPC · JPL
451930	2014 LC_{18}	—	December 18, 2007	Mount Lemmon	Mount Lemmon Survey	·	1.1 km	MPC · JPL
451931	2014 LR_{18}	—	April 22, 1996	Kitt Peak	Spacewatch	·	1.1 km	MPC · JPL
451932	2014 LX_{18}	—	January 6, 2013	Mount Lemmon	Mount Lemmon Survey	·	1.0 km	MPC · JPL
451933	2014 LC_{23}	—	September 10, 2007	Mount Lemmon	Mount Lemmon Survey	·	1.3 km	MPC · JPL
451934	2014 LQ_{23}	—	April 11, 2007	Kitt Peak	Spacewatch	·	720 m	MPC · JPL
451935	2014 LD_{24}	—	February 20, 2009	Mount Lemmon	Mount Lemmon Survey	KON	2.6 km	MPC · JPL
451936	2014 LN_{27}	—	October 3, 2003	Kitt Peak	Spacewatch	·	1.3 km	MPC · JPL
451937	2014 LA_{28}	—	December 24, 2005	Kitt Peak	Spacewatch	·	2.2 km	MPC · JPL
451938	2014 MF	—	September 8, 2002	Haleakala	NEAT	·	1.5 km	MPC · JPL
451939	2014 MQ_{1}	—	July 28, 2011	Siding Spring	SSS	·	870 m	MPC · JPL
451940	2014 MX_{6}	—	September 5, 2010	La Sagra	OAM	·	1.6 km	MPC · JPL
451941	2014 MH_{7}	—	September 12, 2007	Catalina	CSS	·	1.2 km	MPC · JPL
451942	2014 MQ_{8}	—	October 19, 2010	Mount Lemmon	Mount Lemmon Survey	BRA	1.6 km	MPC · JPL
451943	2014 MR_{13}	—	December 22, 2008	Kitt Peak	Spacewatch	·	1.2 km	MPC · JPL
451944	2014 MY_{13}	—	May 8, 2005	Kitt Peak	Spacewatch	·	1.4 km	MPC · JPL
451945	2014 MU_{14}	—	June 17, 2010	Nogales	M. Schwartz, P. R. Holvorcem	·	2.7 km	MPC · JPL
451946	2014 MW_{19}	—	September 12, 2007	Mount Lemmon	Mount Lemmon Survey	MAS	940 m	MPC · JPL
451947	2014 MR_{24}	—	October 19, 2010	Mount Lemmon	Mount Lemmon Survey	·	2.1 km	MPC · JPL
451948	2014 MF_{26}	—	May 27, 2009	Mount Lemmon	Mount Lemmon Survey	·	1.9 km	MPC · JPL
451949	2014 MH_{26}	—	May 25, 2009	Kitt Peak	Spacewatch	·	1.9 km	MPC · JPL
451950	2014 MZ_{27}	—	January 13, 1996	Kitt Peak	Spacewatch	(5)	1.5 km	MPC · JPL
451951	2014 MH_{31}	—	October 30, 2010	Kitt Peak	Spacewatch	·	3.0 km	MPC · JPL
451952	2014 MS_{37}	—	January 13, 2010	WISE	WISE	·	3.9 km	MPC · JPL
451953	2014 MZ_{40}	—	September 24, 2009	Mount Lemmon	Mount Lemmon Survey	EOS	2.2 km	MPC · JPL
451954	2014 ML_{43}	—	September 22, 2009	Catalina	CSS	EOS	2.4 km	MPC · JPL
451955	2014 MR_{46}	—	December 30, 2011	Mount Lemmon	Mount Lemmon Survey	·	1.9 km	MPC · JPL
451956	2014 MG_{52}	—	October 21, 2006	Mount Lemmon	Mount Lemmon Survey	BRA	1.7 km	MPC · JPL
451957	2014 MR_{53}	—	November 15, 2009	Siding Spring	SSS	T_{j} (2.99)	3.8 km	MPC · JPL
451958	2014 MB_{58}	—	August 27, 2009	Kitt Peak	Spacewatch	EOS	2.4 km	MPC · JPL
451959	2014 MN_{59}	—	December 3, 2010	Mount Lemmon	Mount Lemmon Survey	·	2.4 km	MPC · JPL
451960	2014 MR_{59}	—	December 10, 2005	Kitt Peak	Spacewatch	·	3.2 km	MPC · JPL
451961	2014 MS_{60}	—	March 3, 2006	Kitt Peak	Spacewatch	·	1.1 km	MPC · JPL
451962	2014 MO_{61}	—	January 21, 2012	Catalina	CSS	·	2.9 km	MPC · JPL
451963	2014 MR_{61}	—	January 4, 2012	Mount Lemmon	Mount Lemmon Survey	·	1.8 km	MPC · JPL
451964	2014 NR_{3}	—	August 10, 2010	Kitt Peak	Spacewatch	DOR	2.5 km	MPC · JPL
451965	2014 NS_{9}	—	September 30, 2010	Mount Lemmon	Mount Lemmon Survey	KOR	1.1 km	MPC · JPL
451966	2014 NC_{16}	—	January 28, 2010	WISE	WISE	·	2.9 km	MPC · JPL
451967	2014 NV_{20}	—	February 29, 2000	Socorro	LINEAR	·	2.1 km	MPC · JPL
451968	2014 NP_{21}	—	May 24, 2014	Mount Lemmon	Mount Lemmon Survey	·	3.4 km	MPC · JPL
451969	2014 NS_{22}	—	January 27, 2007	Kitt Peak	Spacewatch	·	2.9 km	MPC · JPL
451970	2014 NF_{24}	—	November 20, 2003	Kitt Peak	Spacewatch	·	1.3 km	MPC · JPL
451971	2014 NT_{26}	—	November 19, 2006	Kitt Peak	Spacewatch	HOF	2.5 km	MPC · JPL
451972	2014 NM_{28}	—	June 16, 2009	Mount Lemmon	Mount Lemmon Survey	EOS	2.1 km	MPC · JPL
451973	2014 NF_{29}	—	December 14, 2010	Mount Lemmon	Mount Lemmon Survey	·	1.5 km	MPC · JPL
451974	2014 NO_{30}	—	January 31, 2006	Mount Lemmon	Mount Lemmon Survey	·	2.4 km	MPC · JPL
451975	2014 NP_{34}	—	March 14, 2007	Kitt Peak	Spacewatch	EOS	2.5 km	MPC · JPL
451976	2014 NU_{35}	—	March 14, 2012	Mount Lemmon	Mount Lemmon Survey	·	2.2 km	MPC · JPL
451977	2014 NT_{39}	—	October 2, 2006	Mount Lemmon	Mount Lemmon Survey	·	1.7 km	MPC · JPL
451978	2014 NN_{42}	—	November 1, 2007	Kitt Peak	Spacewatch	·	1.4 km	MPC · JPL
451979	2014 NY_{43}	—	May 8, 2008	Mount Lemmon	Mount Lemmon Survey	·	2.1 km	MPC · JPL
451980	2014 NT_{44}	—	March 15, 2012	Mount Lemmon	Mount Lemmon Survey	EOS	1.8 km	MPC · JPL
451981	2014 NS_{49}	—	November 8, 2010	Mount Lemmon	Mount Lemmon Survey	·	2.0 km	MPC · JPL
451982	2014 NN_{55}	—	August 16, 2009	Kitt Peak	Spacewatch	EOS	2.6 km	MPC · JPL
451983	2014 NS_{56}	—	April 22, 2007	Catalina	CSS	·	4.4 km	MPC · JPL
451984	2014 NP_{58}	—	April 10, 2013	Mount Lemmon	Mount Lemmon Survey	·	2.9 km	MPC · JPL
451985	2014 NS_{60}	—	May 15, 2005	Mount Lemmon	Mount Lemmon Survey	(5)	1.4 km	MPC · JPL
451986	2014 NC_{62}	—	October 1, 2006	Kitt Peak	Spacewatch	·	1.5 km	MPC · JPL
451987	2014 NL_{62}	—	February 4, 2009	Mount Lemmon	Mount Lemmon Survey	·	1.4 km	MPC · JPL
451988	2014 NM_{62}	—	December 10, 2005	Kitt Peak	Spacewatch	·	2.4 km	MPC · JPL
451989	2014 NR_{62}	—	October 12, 2010	Mount Lemmon	Mount Lemmon Survey	·	1.8 km	MPC · JPL
451990	2014 OU_{12}	—	February 7, 2008	Kitt Peak	Spacewatch	·	1.9 km	MPC · JPL
451991	2014 OX_{13}	—	September 14, 2007	Anderson Mesa	LONEOS	3:2	5.5 km	MPC · JPL
451992	2014 OX_{14}	—	March 5, 2008	Kitt Peak	Spacewatch	KOR	1.2 km	MPC · JPL
451993	2014 OZ_{19}	—	November 5, 2007	Mount Lemmon	Mount Lemmon Survey	·	1.0 km	MPC · JPL
451994	2014 OH_{20}	—	March 13, 2013	Kitt Peak	Spacewatch	·	2.3 km	MPC · JPL
451995	2014 OM_{26}	—	December 30, 2005	Kitt Peak	Spacewatch	·	2.6 km	MPC · JPL
451996	2014 OG_{30}	—	January 27, 2006	Kitt Peak	Spacewatch	·	2.7 km	MPC · JPL
451997	2014 OR_{35}	—	February 7, 2006	Kitt Peak	Spacewatch	·	4.1 km	MPC · JPL
451998	2014 OH_{37}	—	March 11, 2013	Catalina	CSS	·	1 km	MPC · JPL
451999	2014 OA_{39}	—	October 5, 2004	Kitt Peak	Spacewatch	·	2.5 km	MPC · JPL
452000	2014 OQ_{45}	—	December 25, 2005	Kitt Peak	Spacewatch	·	1.8 km	MPC · JPL

back to top

== Meaning of names ==
As minor planet discoveries are confirmed, they are given a permanent number by the IAU's Minor Planet Center (MPC), and the discoverers can then submit names for them, following the IAU's naming conventions. The list below concerns those minor planets in the specified number-range that have received names, and explains the meanings of those names.

Official naming citations of newly named small Solar System bodies are approved and published in a bulletin by IAU's Working Group for Small Bodies Nomenclature (WGSBN). Before May 2021, citations were published in MPC's Minor Planet Circulars for many decades. Recent citations can also be found on the JPL Small-Body Database (SBDB). Until his death in 2016, German astronomer Lutz D. Schmadel compiled these citations into the Dictionary of Minor Planet Names (DMP) and regularly updated the collection.

Based on Paul Herget's The Names of the Minor Planets, Schmadel also researched the unclear origin of numerous asteroids, most of which had been named prior to World War II. This article incorporates text from this source, which is in the public domain: SBDB New namings may only be added to this list below after official publication as the preannouncement of names is condemned. The WGSBN publishes a comprehensive guideline for the naming rules of non-cometary small Solar System bodies.

Named minor planet	Provisional	This minor planet was named for...	Ref · Catalog
451138 Rizvanov	2009 QC_{37}	Naufal Gayazovich Rizvanov (1930–2012) was a Soviet and Russian astronomer, and a full professor of astrometry and celestial mechanics. He initiated and organized the construction of the Kazan State University observatories at Nakhichevan (1960) and Zelenchuk (1971).	JPL · 451138
