= Exploration of dwarf planets =

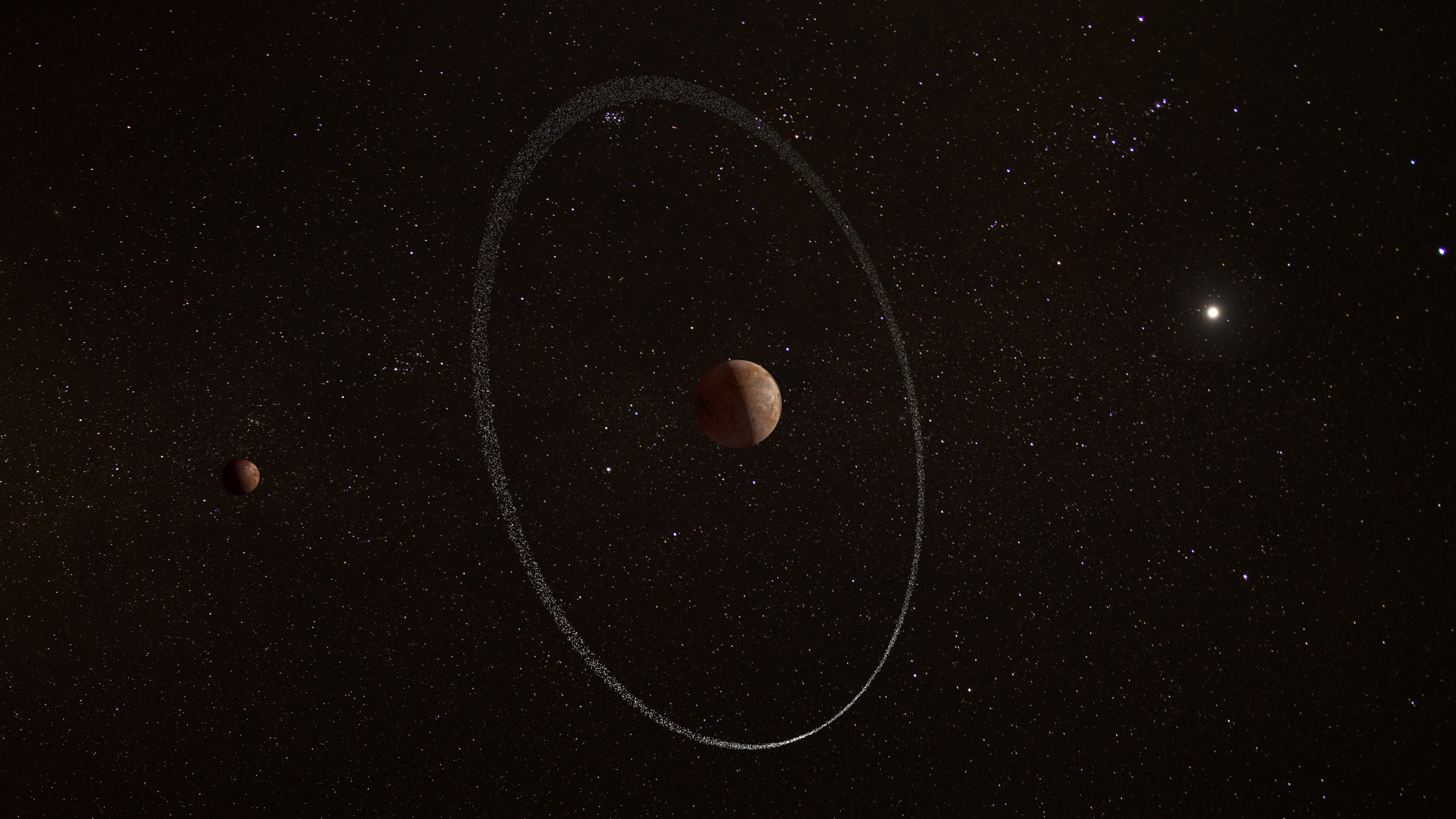
Artist's impression of 50000 Quaoar and its moon Weywot, potential targets for a flyby mission by the Chinese probe Shensuo.

The exploration of dwarf planets involves studying these celestial bodies within the Solar System. Since Pluto's reclassification as a dwarf planet in 2006 by the International Astronomical Union (IAU), space exploration has increasingly focused on these celestial bodies.

In 2015 significant milestones in dwarf planet exploration were reached with the flybys of Pluto and Ceres by the New Horizons and Dawn spacecraft.

== Technical requirements ==
Exploring dwarf planets demands significant fuel resources, which vary depending on the targeted celestial bodies. However, various methods have been developed to conserve fuel in probes traveling long distances.

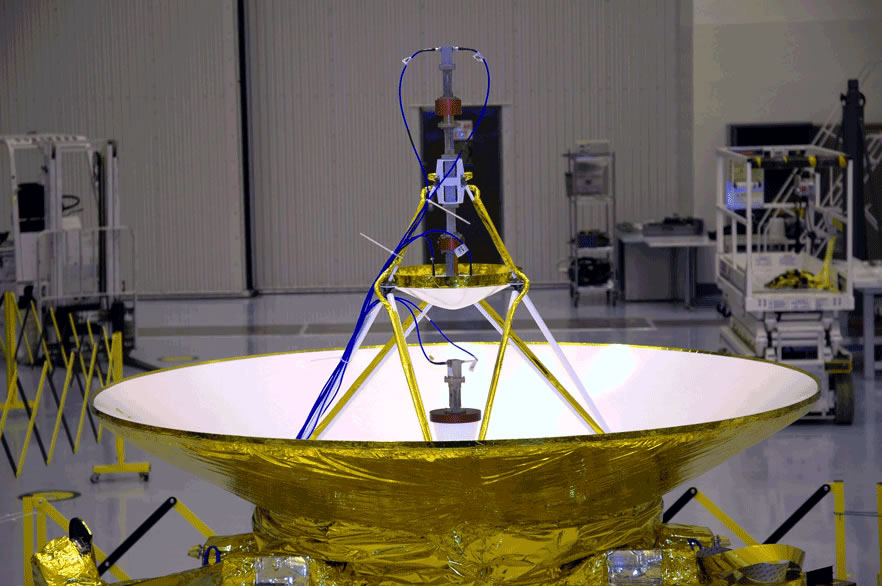
Interstellar probes, such as New Horizons, use high-gain antennas to ensure communication with Earth over vast distances.

Missions to dwarf planets in the outer Solar System necessitate careful planning and execution, with spacecraft hibernation employed specifically to conserve energy for the prolonged interplanetary journeys. This allows the spacecraft to endure the extended travel time while maintaining essential functions for navigation and communication.

Successful missions to distant dwarf planets also require substantial fuel reserves on board. These reserves are crucial for trajectory adjustments, course corrections, and orbital insertions upon arrival at the target dwarf planet. The spacecraft's propulsion systems must deliver the necessary thrust over long distances to counter the gravitational influences of celestial bodies encountered during the journey.

Gravity assists are critical for optimizing spacecraft trajectories and accelerating them toward their target dwarf planets. During a gravity assist, the spacecraft uses the gravitational pull of celestial bodies, such as planets or moons, to gain momentum and alter its trajectory without expending extra fuel. Careful planning of these maneuvers can significantly reduce travel time and fuel requirements for reaching distant dwarf planets.

High-gain antennas are pivotal in space exploration, especially in missions to distant celestial bodies like dwarf planets. Unlike conventional antennas, high-gain antennas concentrate their radiation pattern into a narrow beam, enhancing signal strength and data transmission rates. This feature is vital for maintaining uninterrupted contact with spacecraft operating in the remote reaches of the Solar System, where radio signals undergo significant attenuation. By leveraging high-gain antennas, mission controllers can receive crucial scientific data and telemetry from spacecraft exploring dwarf planets, enabling real-time monitoring and operational control. Furthermore, these antennas facilitate the exchange of commands and instructions, empowering spacecraft to execute intricate maneuvers and scientific observations autonomously.

== Flyby missions ==
=== 2010s ===
==== Dawn program (2015) ====
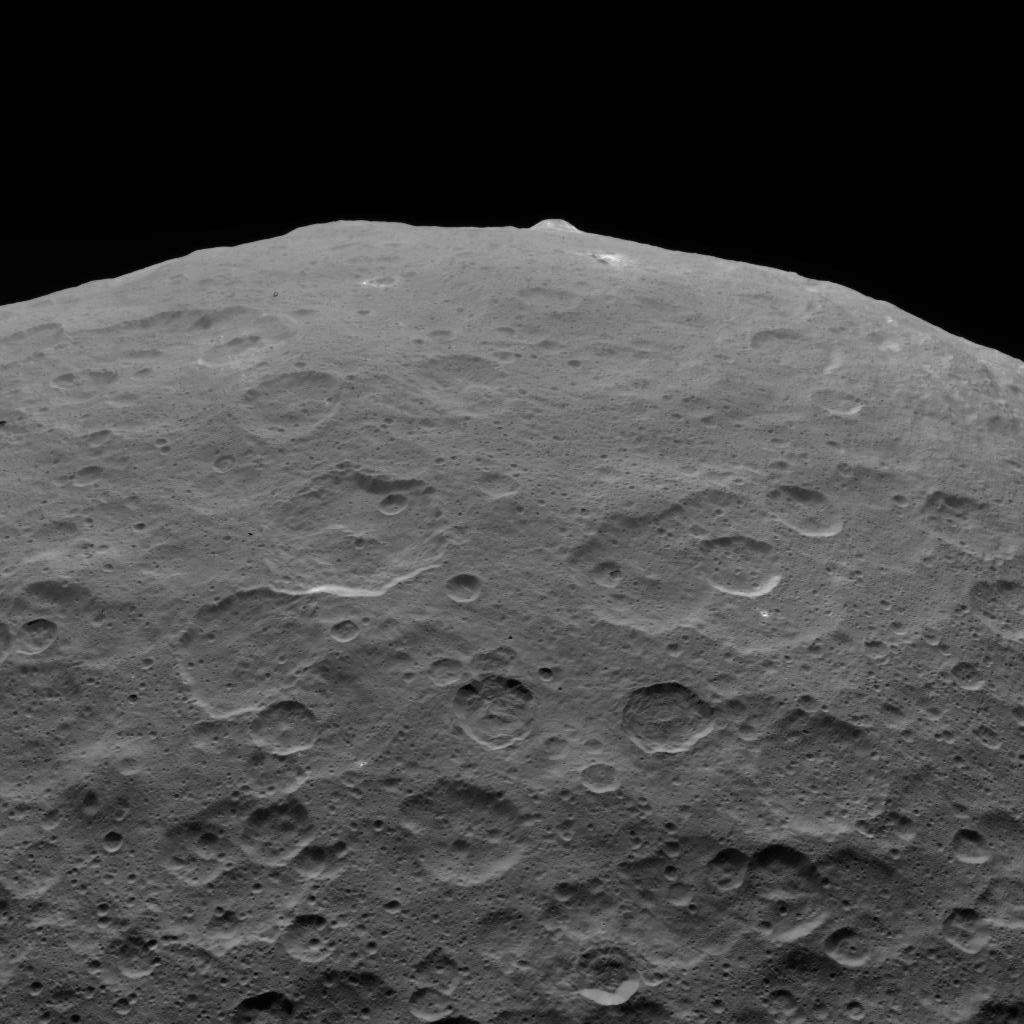
Image captured by the Dawn spacecraft, revealing the rugged terrain of Ceres, including one of its prominent features, Ahuna Mons.

In September 2007, the Dawn spacecraft launched on a mission from Cape Canaveral Space Launch Complex 17 on a mission to explore two of the three largest bodies in the asteroid belt, 4 Vesta and 1 Ceres. After nearly four years, Dawn entered orbit around Vesta on July 16, 2011. Subsequently, on September 5, 2012, it concluded its Vesta mission and commenced its journey to Ceres.

On December 1, 2014, Dawn captured images revealing an extended disc around Ceres. In January 2015, it compiled a series of images of Ceres into a stop-motion animation, depicting its rotation in low resolution. Following January 26, 2015, Dawn obtained higher-quality images than those captured by ground telescopes. It entered orbit around Ceres on March 6, 2015.

On October 31, 2018, Dawn exhausted its fuel reserves and lost communication with Earth. The spacecraft will remain in orbit around Ceres until at least 2038.

==== New Horizons program (2015) ====
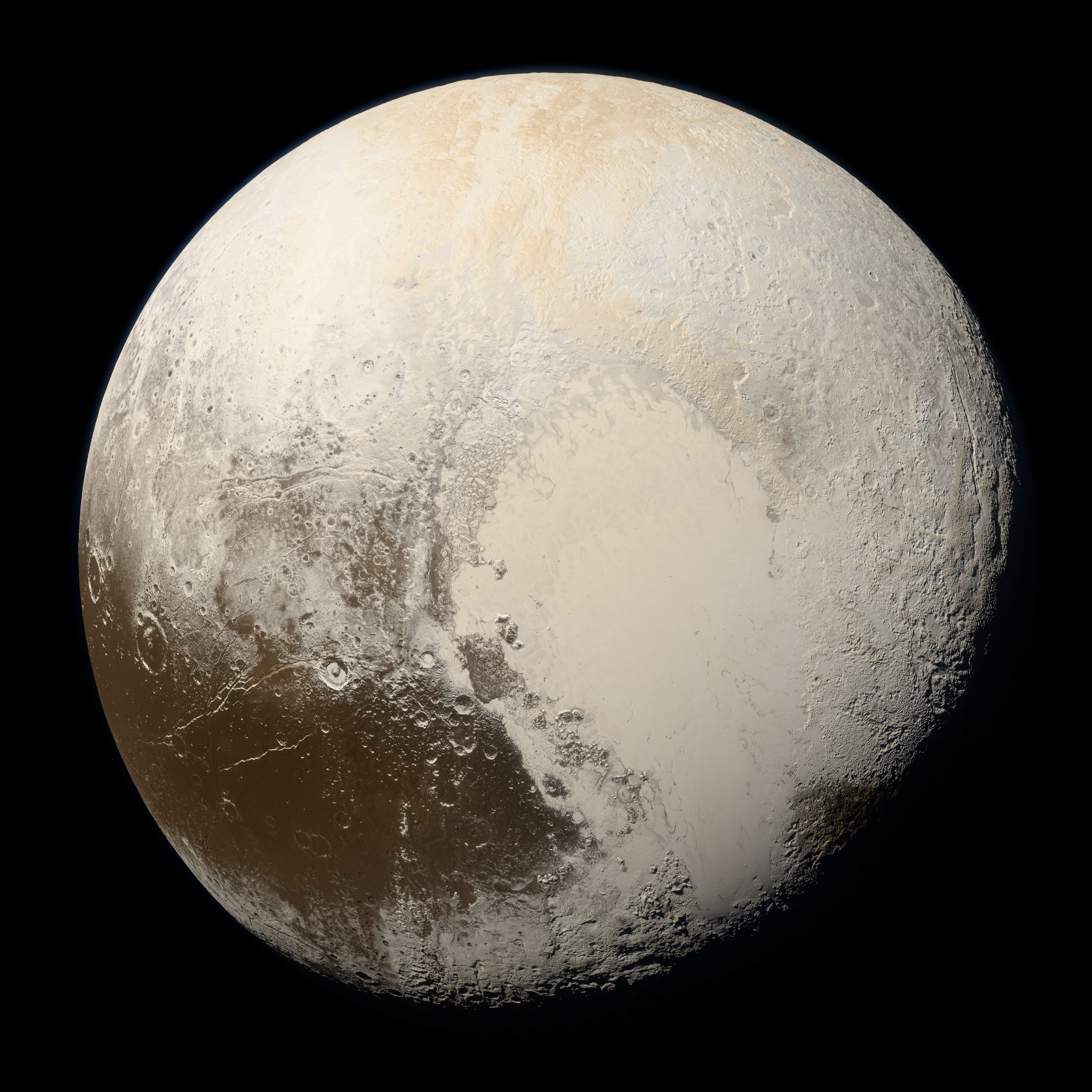
Image of Pluto taken from the New Horizons probe from a distance of 35,445 kilometers (22,025 miles), showcasing its intricate nitrogen geology.

In 2006, the New Horizons probe launched on its mission to explore the Plutonian system.

In 2007, New Horizons performed a gravity assist using Jupiter. This maneuver increased the probe's velocity by 4 km/s (14,000 km/h; 9,000 mph), cutting its travel time to Pluto by three years.

On February 4, 2015, New Horizons entered the Plutonian system, capturing images of Pluto and its moon Charon from about 203,000,000 km (126,000,000 mi) away. From April to June 2015, New Horizons delivered higher-quality images than those from ground telescopes.

On July 14, 2015, the New Horizons probe took close-up photos of Pluto from 18,000 kilometers away. The data collected was transmitted to Earth and received on September 13, 2015.

== Proposed probes ==
=== 2040s ===
==== IHP-1 (2040) ====
IHP-1 is a proposed spacecraft in the Shensuo program (Chinese: 神梭), designed to fly by Jupiter, the dwarf planet Quaoar, and its moon Weywot, before heading into interstellar space.

IHP-1 is set to launch with IHP-2 and the proposed IHP-3. IHP-1 will use a gravity assist from Earth in December 2027. It will then fly by Jupiter in March 2029, traveling towards the heliosphere. On its way to interstellar space, it will encounter Quaoar and its moon Weywot in 2040.

==== Proposed probes list ====
"Status" column legend

In progress
Cancelled
No updates

Spacecraft	Organization	Planned/Proposed launch	Type	Notes	Image	Ref(s).
Calathus Mission	(European Union) ESA	2030	Sample-return	Proposed student-designed probe set to launch in 2030, aiming to reach and sample Ceres' surface, particularly the Occator crater, by 2040.	N/A	
Fusion-Enabled Pluto Orbiter and Lander	(United States) NASA	N/A	Orbiter/Lander	A probe equipped with a Direct Fusion Drive (DFD) propulsion system that is planned to orbit and land on Pluto.		
IHP-1	(China) CNSA	May 2024	Flyby	Proposed probe in the Shensuo program (Chinese: 神梭). Planned to launch alongside IHP-2 and the proposed IHP-3, IHP-1 will utilize gravity assists from Earth in December 2027, followed by a Jupiter flyby in March 2029, en route to the heliosphere. During its journey to interstellar space, it is expected to encounter Quaoar and its moon Weywot in 2040.	N/A	
Persephone	(United States) NASA	N/A	Orbiter	A probe that will orbit Pluto for three years and investigate the possibility of a subsurface ocean.	N/A	
Pluto Hop, Skip, and Jump	(United States) NASA	N/A	Lander	A probe designed to land on Pluto, similar to the proposed Triton Hopper mission.	N/A	
Mariner Mark II	(United States) NASA	N/A (Note: Proposed family of spacecraft, designed for multiple independent launches rather than a single mission.)	N/A	Proposed family of spacecraft intended to explore dwarf planets and trans-Neptunian objects, later replaced by the lower-cost Discovery Program.	N/A	N/A
New Horizons 2	(United States) NASA	N/A	Flyby	Proposed probe to fly by trans-Neptunian objects using a Uranus gravity assist. Canceled in March 2005 due to a plutonium-238 shortage needed for powering the probes radioisotope thermoelectric generators (RTGs).	N/A	
Pluto Kuiper Express	(United States) NASA	December 2004	Flyby	Proposed probe to fly by Pluto, planned for a 2004 launch, Jupiter assist in 2006, and Pluto arrival by 2012. Canceled in 2000, it inspired the New Horizons mission, which launched in 2006 and reached Pluto in 2015.		

== Human exploration ==
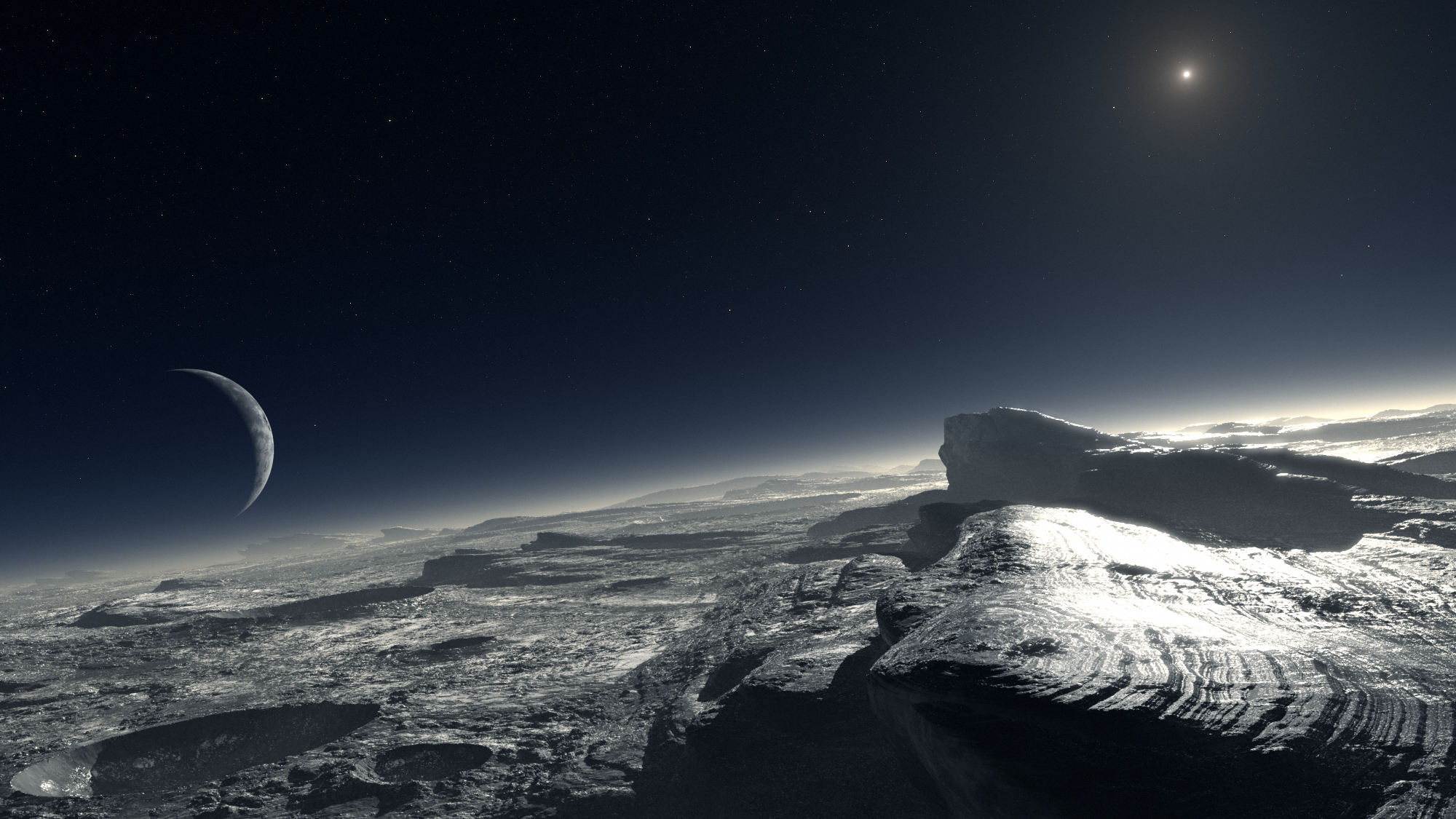
Artist's depiction of Pluto's rugged surface, highlighting its diverse terrain and featuring its largest moon, Charon.

The concept of human exploration of dwarf planets has intrigued scientists since Pluto's discovery in 1930. Despite the vast distances and significant challenges, advancements in space technology could make such endeavors possible. Colonizing dwarf planets offers potential economic benefits due to the presence of rare and valuable ores.

Mining operations on dwarf planets present significant economic opportunities. These bodies may harbor rare elements and minerals, including hydrocarbons and precious metals like platinum.
