= Exploration of Pluto =

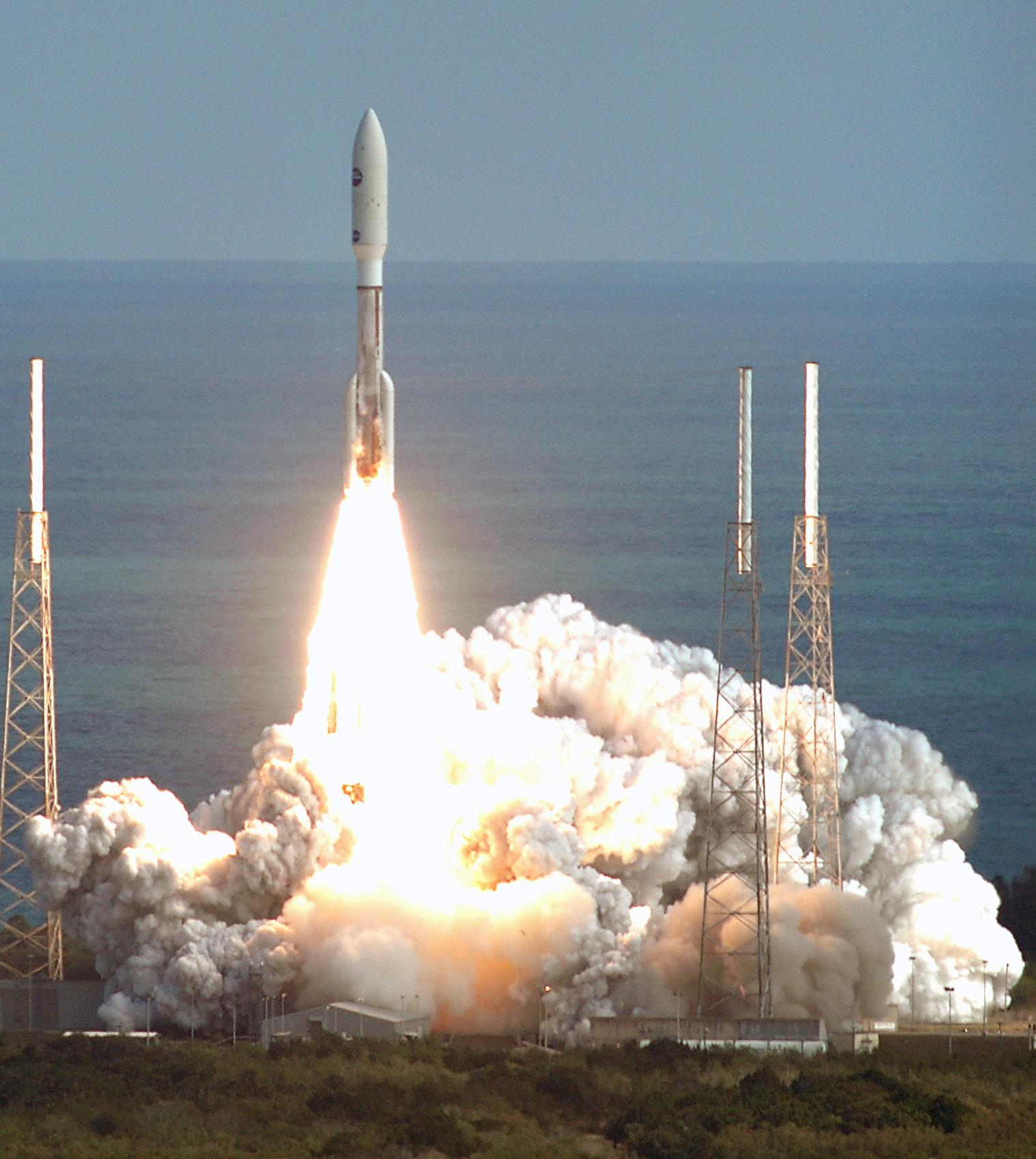
New Horizons, launched on 19 January 2006

A 3,462-day journey to Pluto

The exploration of Pluto began with the arrival of the New Horizons probe in July 2015, though proposals for such a mission had been studied for many decades. There are no plans as yet for a follow-up mission, though follow-up concepts have been studied.

== Early mission proposals ==
Pluto, discovered by Clyde Tombaugh in 1930, is an interesting target for planetary exploration, but Pluto presents significant challenges for exploration because of its small mass and great distance from Earth.

In 1964, Gary Flandro of the Jet Propulsion Laboratory proposed a mission called Grand Tour, taking advantage of the fact that an alignment of planets in the late 1970s would enable a single spacecraft to visit all of the outer planets, including Pluto, by using gravity assists. Due to the cost, the mission was not funded, although the planetary alignment was used by the two probes of the Voyager program, launched in 1977.

One of many possibilities for the Voyager 1 spacecraft after its flyby of Saturn in 1980 was to use Saturn as a slingshot towards Pluto for a flyby as early as March 1986. However, scientists decided that a flyby of Titan during the Saturn encounter would be a more important scientific objective, making a subsequent flyby of Pluto impossible, because the close approach to Titan put it on a trajectory that slingshotted it out of the plane of the Solar System. Because no mission to Pluto was planned by any space agency at the time, it would be left unexplored by interplanetary spacecraft for years to come.

After the success of the Voyager program, planetary scientists looked to Pluto as the destination for a subsequent mission. In the 1980s, Robert Farquhar proposed that a Pluto mission could be added to the proposed Solar Probe mission, which at the time was proposed to fly by Jupiter on the way to its solar encounter. The mission was tagged "Fire and Ice." However, the proposal was not accepted.

=== The Pluto Underground, Pluto 350 and Mariner Mark II ===
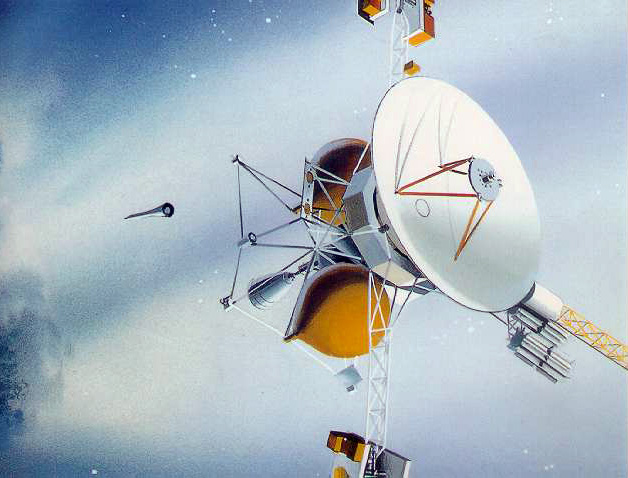
One of the many early concepts for a mission to Pluto was to send a Mariner Mark II spacecraft. This was later ruled out in favor of a smaller, less expensive spacecraft similar to the "Pluto 350" concept.

In May 1989, a group of scientists and engineers, including Alan Stern and Fran Bagenal, formed an alliance called the "Pluto Underground". It was named in homage of the Mars Underground, another group of scientists that successfully lobbied for the restart of missions to Mars, following the lack of such since the Viking program. The group started a letter writing campaign which aimed to bring to attention Pluto as a viable target for exploration. In 1990, because of pressure from the scientific community, including those of the Pluto Underground, engineers at NASA decided to look into concepts for a mission to Pluto. At the time, it was thought that the atmosphere of Pluto would freeze and fall to the surface during winter, and so a lightweight spacecraft was desirable, as it would be able to reach Pluto before such an event would occur. One of the earliest concepts was for a 40-kilogram spacecraft that would reach Pluto in five to six years. The idea was shortly scrapped, however, because of the infeasibility of miniaturizing scientific instruments aboard such a spacecraft to that size.

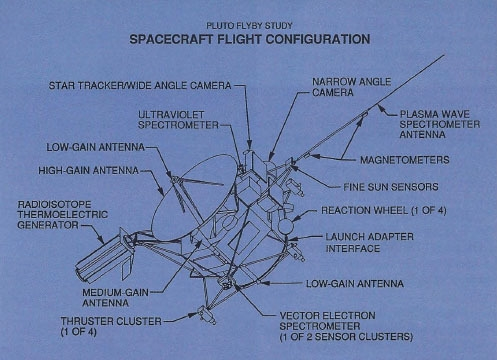
A diagram of Pluto 350.

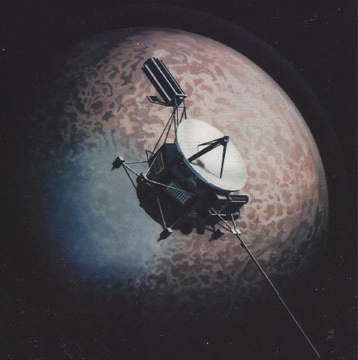
An artist's impression of Pluto 350

Another mission concept, known as Pluto 350, was developed by Robert Farquhar of the Goddard Space Flight Center, with Alan Stern and Fran Bagenal of the Pluto Underground, who both served as study scientists for the project. Pluto 350 aimed to send a spacecraft, weighing around 350 kilograms, to Pluto. The spacecraft's minimalistic design was to allow it to travel faster and be more cost-effective, in contrast to most other big-budget projects NASA were developing at the time, such as Galileo and Cassini. Pluto 350, however, would later become controversial among mission planners at NASA, who considered the project to be too small and too high-risk. Doubts about the cost-effectiveness were raised by Farquhar's team as Pluto had just passed perihelion, which would exponentially increase the mission duration before the launch date was finalized. Pluto's approximate axial tilt of 118 degrees meant that the southern hemisphere would not be able to be photographed as it entered decades-long darkness with the onset of winter.

An alternative plan which was considered at one point was to send to Pluto a configuration of the Mariner Mark II spacecraft, which would weigh 2,000 kilograms and cost US$3.2 billion, in sharp contrast to Pluto 350's $543 million cost. While both projects competed for approval, Pluto 350 was more favored by NASA mission planners, who were starting to adopt smaller missions such as Mars Pathfinder and NEAR Shoemaker.

=== Pluto postage stamp ===
For many years, people had waved that stamp around as sort of a call to arms, as a motivating graphic: "Not yet explored". That stamp had been in so many presentations by that point, I knew it would please people to have it go along.

— S. Alan Stern on the USPS stamp

In October 1991, the United States Postal Service released a series of stamps commemorating NASA's exploration of the Solar System. The series featured a stamp for all planets, displaying an image of the planet and highlighting an associated spacecraft which was sent to it. The stamp for Pluto, however, depicted a featureless sphere, presented with the phrase "not yet explored" in place of the name of a spacecraft. The stamps were unveiled in a ceremony at the Jet Propulsion Laboratory.

Two scientists who attended the event, World Space Foundation president Robert Staehle and JPL scientist Stacy Weinstein, were inspired by Pluto's status on the stamp, such that they started to inquire about the feasibility of sending a spacecraft to Pluto. Engineers at the Jet Propulsion Laboratory, inspired by the "Not Yet Explored" status of Pluto, also started to put forward ideas about a mission to Pluto.

In August 1992, Staehle telephoned Pluto's discoverer, Clyde Tombaugh, requesting permission to visit his planet. "I told him he was welcome to it", Tombaugh later remembered, "though he's got to go one long, cold trip".

=== Pluto Fast Flyby ===
That year, Staehle, with the help of JPL engineers and students from the California Institute of Technology, formed the Pluto Fast Flyby project. The mission heralded the same ideology as the Pluto 350 concept: small in size and cost-effective in scope, so that the spacecraft would be able to get to Pluto faster and be affordable to develop and launch. Described as a "radical" mission concept, the mission would see two spacecraft being sent to Pluto. Both spacecraft were to weigh only around 35-50 kilograms each (including 7 kg worth of scientific instruments), and the project would cost less than US$500 million to develop, excluding launch costs. Described by Staehle as a "faster, better, [and] cheaper" approach than the Pluto 350 and Mariner Mark II projects, it caught the attention of then-NASA Administrator Daniel S. Goldin, who ordered all work on both Pluto 350 and Mariner Mark II to cease and shift all resources to the new Pluto Fast Flyby project instead.

During the development of Pluto Fast Flyby, however, there were multiple concerns from both NASA, Administrator Goldin and the mission's development team. As research and development into the mission progressed, the project's size, scope, and budget all expanded. Additionally, morale among the team and personnel working on interplanetary missions was low following the loss of the Mars Observer spacecraft in August 1993. Alan Stern would later cite that event as a significant factor towards the low enthusiasm for the Pluto Fast Flyby project.

The spacecraft were intended to be launched using Titan IV rockets, which would have cost US$400 million each, thus raising the budget to over US$1 billion. Because of growing budget constraints, the dual-spacecraft concept was scrapped in favor of sending a single spacecraft to Pluto. The project was still too expensive, however, in the eyes of Administrator Goldin. Alan Stern, as a compromise, reached an agreement with Russian Space Research Institute scientists in Moscow, in which Pluto Fast Flyby would be launched atop a Proton rocket, saving NASA over US$400 million in launch costs. Alec Galeev, head of the Russian Space Research Institute, reached the agreement with Stern by stipulating that Russia would include an atmospheric probe that would impact Pluto after studying its atmosphere with a mass spectrometer. The proposal was forwarded to Administrator Goldin, but he vetoed the proposal, recommending instead that the JPL look into the feasibility of Pluto Fast Flyby being launched aboard a smaller rocket, such as the Delta II.

=== Kuiper belt, Pluto Kuiper Express and cancellation ===
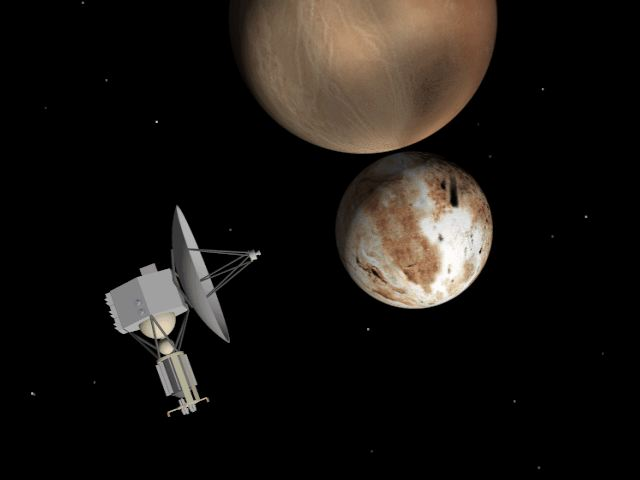
Concept art for the Pluto Kuiper Express; the last iteration of the original Pluto mission concepts, eventually cancelled in 2000.

During the course of the late 1990s, a number of trans-Neptunian objects were discovered, confirming the existence of a Kuiper belt. Interest in a mission to the Kuiper belt arose such that NASA instructed the JPL to re-purpose the mission as not only a Pluto flyby, but also a Kuiper belt object (KBO) flyby. The mission was thus re-branded as the Pluto Kuiper Express, after briefly being billed as Pluto Express prior to the revision. The weight of the spacecraft was raised again, this time to 175 kilograms, and NASA allowed further liberty with the project's budget.

However, Goldin later decided that Pluto Kuiper Express was of low importance, and thus cut funding to the project drastically. Eventually, despite official selection of scientific instruments and the appointment of several investigators, then-Science Mission Directorate Edward J. Weiler ordered the cancellation of the entire Pluto and Kuiper belt mission in 2000, citing growing budget constraints, which had plagued the project since its inception in 1992. At the time of cancellation, the projected costs surpassed $1 billion.

The cancellation of Pluto Kuiper Express angered some of the space-exploration scientific community, which led to groups, such as The Planetary Society, lobbying NASA for either a reboot of the Pluto Kuiper Express or a restart of a mission to Pluto. Internal divisions within NASA, including its Scientific Advisory Council, also voiced support for a Pluto mission. In response to the backlash caused by the cancellation of Pluto Kuiper Express, it was decided to inaugurate a new class of missions that would fit between the big-budget Flagship Program and the low-budget Discovery Program, creating a compromise for missions such as the former Pluto Kuiper Express, which proved to be too expensive for the Discovery Program. A competition was held, in which NASA would select a mission concept to fund as part of the first mission of the New Frontiers program.

=== Proposed exploration (2003) ===
A Pluto orbiter/lander/sample return mission was proposed in 2003. The plan included a twelve-year trip from Earth to Pluto, mapping from orbit, multiple landings, a warm water probe, and possible in situ propellant production for another twelve-year trip back to Earth with samples. Power and propulsion would come from the bimodal MITEE nuclear reactor system.

== New Horizons ==
After an intense political battle, a revised mission to Pluto called New Horizons was granted funding from the US government in 2003. New Horizons was launched successfully on 19 January 2006. The mission leader, S. Alan Stern, confirmed that some of the ashes of Clyde Tombaugh, who died in 1997, had been placed aboard the spacecraft.

First Pluto sighting from New Horizons in 2006

New Horizons captured its first (distant) images of Pluto in late September 2006, during a test of the Long Range Reconnaissance Imager. The images, taken from a distance of approximately 4.2 billion kilometers, confirmed the spacecraft's ability to track distant targets, critical for maneuvering toward Pluto and other Kuiper belt objects. In early 2007 the craft made use of a gravity assist from Jupiter.

On 4 February 2015, NASA released new images of Pluto (taken on 25 and 27 January) from the approaching probe. New Horizons was more than 203,000,000 km (126,000,000 mi) away from Pluto when it began taking the photos, which showed Pluto and its largest moon, Charon. On 20 March 2015, NASA invited the general public to suggest names for surface features that will be discovered on Pluto and Charon. On 15 April 2015, Pluto was imaged showing a possible polar cap. Between April and June 2015, New Horizons began returning images of Pluto that exceeded the quality that the Hubble Space Telescope could produce.

Pluto's small moons, discovered shortly before and after the probe's launch, were considered to be potentially hazardous, as debris from collisions between them and other Kuiper belt objects could have produced a tenuous dusty ring. If New Horizons had travelled through such a ring system, there would have been an increased risk of potentially disabling micrometeoroid damage.

New Horizons had its closest approach to Pluto on 14 July 2015—after a 3,462-day journey across the Solar System. Scientific observations of Pluto began five months before the closest approach and continued for at least a month after the encounter. New Horizons used a remote sensing package that includes imaging instruments and a radio science investigation tool, as well as spectroscopic and other experiments, to characterize the global geology and morphology of Pluto and its moon Charon, map their surface composition and analyze Pluto's neutral atmosphere and its escape rate. New Horizons also photographed the surfaces of Pluto and Charon.

Photographs of Pluto taken on 14 July 2015 taken 15 minutes after New Horizon's closest approach, from a distance of 18,000 kilometers and sent to Earth on 13 September 2015 show a near-sunset on Pluto with details of the surface and a haze in the atmosphere.

== Future mission concepts ==
No follow-up missions to New Horizons have been formally planned, but at least two mission concepts have been studied. In April 2017, a workshop met in Houston, Texas to discuss ideas for a follow-up mission. Possible objectives discussed by the group for a follow-up mission include mapping the surface at 30 feet per pixel, observations of Pluto's smaller satellites, observations of how Pluto changes as it rotates on its axis, and topographic mapping of Pluto's regions that are covered in long-term darkness due to its axial tilt. The last objective could be accomplished using infrared laser pulses. According to New Horizons principal investigator Alan Stern, “If we send an orbiter, we can map 100 percent of the planet, even terrains that are in total shadow." Stern and David Grinspoon have also suggested that an orbiter mission could search for evidence of the subsurface ocean hinted at in New Horizons data.

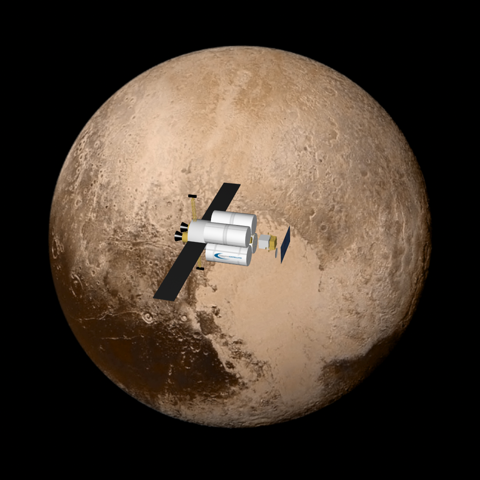
Artist's impression of the Fusion-Enabled Pluto Orbiter and Lander at Pluto, with a New Horizons image of Pluto in the background.

Shortly after the New Horizons flyby, Stern suggested a Charon lander as a follow-up that would observe Pluto from Charon's surface. However, such a lander would only observe the Charon-facing hemisphere of Pluto, as Pluto and Charon are tidally locked. Since the Houston workshop, Stern changed his mind to advocate instead for a Cassini-style orbiter that would use Charon's gravity to adjust its orbit while studying Pluto and its moons. The probe could use electric propulsion similar to NASA's Dawn mission. It would then have the option of using Charon's gravity to leave the Pluto system after all Pluto science objectives are completed and study new KBOs beyond Pluto. Stern envisaged the probe being launched in 2030, marking the 100th anniversary of Pluto's discovery, and spending 7–8 years traveling to the Pluto system.

=== Fusion-Enabled Pluto Orbiter and Lander ===
The Fusion-Enabled Pluto Orbiter and Lander was a 2017 phase I report funded by the NASA Innovative Advanced Concepts (NIAC) program. The report, written by principal investigator Stephanie Thomas of Princeton Satellite Systems, Inc., describes a Direct Fusion Drive (DFD) mission to Pluto. A fusion reactor would be used to send a 1000 kg orbiter and lander to the Pluto system in only four years (more than twice as fast as New Horizons).

=== Pluto Hop, Skip, and Jump ===
Global Aerospace Corporation presented a Pluto lander concept titled "Pluto Hop, Skip, and Jump" at the 2017 NIAC Symposium in Denver, Colorado. The concept describes an entrycraft that would brake using the drag of Pluto's thin but highly extended atmosphere. Once on Pluto's surface, the vehicle would exploit Pluto's low gravity to hop between sites using propellant. This is similar to NASA's Triton Hopper concept for exploring Neptune's largest moon Triton.

=== Persephone ===
Another proposal submitted to NASA in 2020 is an orbital probe of the Pluto & Charon system, named "Persephone".

It would be powered by 5 RTGs, contain several high-resolution cameras, and orbit for 3 years. A key goal would be to determine whether there is a subsurface ocean on Pluto. Estimated cost would be $3 billion.

== See also ==
- Exploration of dwarf planets
