= 772 Tanete =

Main-belt asteroid

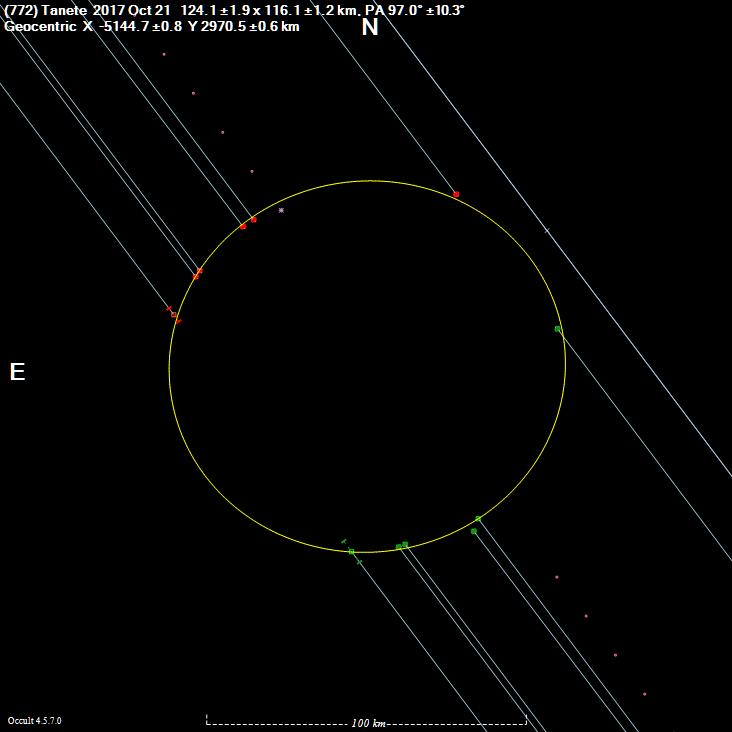
- A multichord occultation by Tanete

Discovery
- Discovered by: A. Massinger
- Discovery site: Heidelberg Obs.
- Discovery date: 19 December 1913

Designations
- Named after: Tanette
- Alternative designations: 1913 TR

Orbital characteristics
- Epoch 31 July 2016 (JD 2457600.5)
- Uncertainty parameter 0
- Observation arc: 101.93 yr (37230 d)
- Aphelion: 3.2768 AU (490.20 Gm)
- Perihelion: 2.7244 AU (407.56 Gm)
- Semi-major axis: 3.0006 AU (448.88 Gm)
- Eccentricity: 0.092055
- Orbital period (sidereal): 5.20 yr (1898.5 d)
- Mean anomaly: 163.71°
- Mean motion: 0° 11^{m} 22.668^{s} / day
- Inclination: 28.854°
- Longitude of ascending node: 63.832°
- Argument of perihelion: 146.061°
- Earth MOID: 1.73811 AU (260.018 Gm)
- Jupiter MOID: 1.78259 AU (266.672 Gm)
- T_{Jupiter}: 3.059

Physical characteristics
- Mean radius: 58.83±2 km
- Mass: (1.6±1.6)×10^{18} kg (Note: Calculated from its standard gravitational parameter GM = 0.11±0.11 km^{3}/s^{2}.) (SB441)
- Mean density: 1.9±1.9 g/cm^{3} (calculated)
- Synodic rotation period: 17.258 h (0.7191 d)
- Geometric albedo: 0.0594±0.004
- Absolute magnitude (H): 8.33

772 Tanete is an asteroid from the asteroid belt. Since 2004 it has been observed in stellar occultation four times. Its size is best described by an ellipsoid measuring 124.1±1.2 km x 116.1±1.2 km. Analysis of a light curve captured during 2014 shows a synodic rotation period of 17.258±0.001 h with an amplitude of 0.15 magnitude.

In 1984, a fly-by of 772 Tanete was considered for a Mariner Mark II rendezvous mission with the short period comet 22P/Kopff.

== See also ==
- List of Solar System objects by size
