= 723 Hammonia =

Minor planet orbiting the Sun

Discovery
- Discovered by: J. Palisa
- Discovery site: Vienna Observatory
- Discovery date: 21 October 1911

Designations
- Pronunciation: /hæˈmoʊniə/
- Named after: Hamburg
- Alternative designations: 1911 NB

Orbital characteristics
- Epoch 31 July 2016 (JD 2457600.5)
- Uncertainty parameter 0
- Observation arc: 113.17 yr (41337 d)
- Aphelion: 3.1540 AU (471.83 Gm)
- Perihelion: 2.8324 AU (423.72 Gm)
- Semi-major axis: 2.9932 AU (447.78 Gm)
- Eccentricity: 0.053719
- Orbital period (sidereal): 5.18 yr (1891.5 d)
- Mean anomaly: 71.167°
- Mean motion: 0° 11^{m} 25.188^{s} / day
- Inclination: 4.9954°
- Longitude of ascending node: 163.351°
- Argument of perihelion: 246.398°

Physical characteristics
- Mean radius: 17.84±0.7 km
- Synodic rotation period: 5.436 h (0.2265 d)
- Geometric albedo: 0.1829±0.015
- Absolute magnitude (H): 10.0

723 Hammonia is a minor planet orbiting the Sun. It was discovered in 1911 and is named after the city of Hamburg. Although the name alludes to Hamburg it was discovered in Vienna.

The asteroid was discovered by the noted and prolific astronomer Johann Palisa. He worked from Pola early in his career and later from Vienna observatories. The same night he discovered Hammonia, he also discovered 724 Hapag and 725 Amanda. He discovered dozens and dozens of asteroids between 1874 and 1923, ranging from 136 Austria to 1073 Gellivara.

As seen from a certain area on Earth, 723 Hammonia occulted the star 3UC149-190572 on June 3, 2013.

In 2014 it was noted to have a high-albedo and amorphous Mg pyroxenes was suggested as a possible reason for this.

== See also ==
- 449 Hamburga (another asteroid named after Hamburg)
- Vienna Observatory
