= CRAF =

CRAF may refer to:

- Canadian Charter of Rights and Freedoms
- Civil Reserve Air Fleet
- Comet Rendezvous Asteroid Flyby
- Committee on Radio Astronomy Frequencies
- Cuban Revolutionary Armed Forces

== See also ==
- C-Raf, a human enzyme encoded by the RAF1 gene
