= Anton Staus =

German astronomer

Asteroids discovered: 1
335 Roberta	1 September 1892

Anton Staus (5 September 1872 – 21 July 1955) was a German astronomer.

As a young man, he discovered the inner main-belt asteroid 335 Roberta at Heidelberg Observatory in 1892. It was the 12th asteroid that was discovered using photography.
