= Hamburg Mathematical Society =

The Hamburg Mathematical Society (German: Mathematische Gesellschaft in Hamburg) is a learned society concerned with mathematics and located in the German city of Hamburg.

It was founded in 1690 by Heinrich Meissner as the "Kunstrechnungsübende Societät". It is the oldest still-active mathematical society in the world, and the second-oldest scientific society in Germany after the Academy of Sciences Leopoldina, which was founded in 1652. Two asteroids, 449 Hamburga and 454 Mathesis, were given their names at an anniversary celebration of the society in 1901.

Its journal is the Mitteilungen der Mathematischen Gesellschaft in Hamburg. It began publications in 1881, succeeding a listing of society talks which had been sent out to members since 1873.
