= 335 Roberta =

Large main belt asteroid

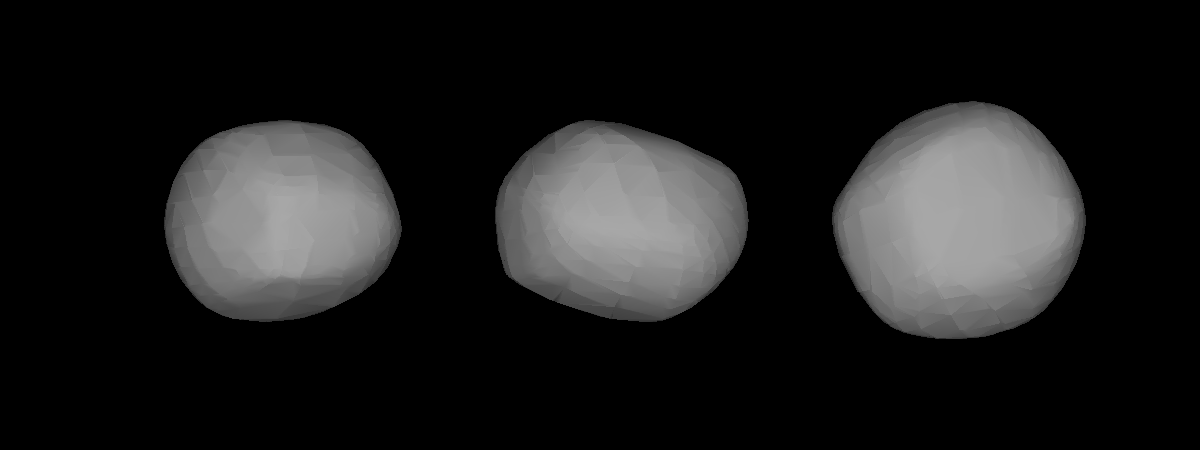
- Lightcurve-based 3D model of 335 Roberta

Discovery
- Discovered by: Anton Staus
- Discovery date: 1 September 1892

Designations
- Named after: Carl Robert Osten-Sacken
- Alternative designations: 1892 C
- Minor planet category: Main belt

Orbital characteristics
- Epoch 31 July 2016 (JD 2457600.5)
- Uncertainty parameter 0
- Observation arc: 123.58 yr (45137 d)
- Aphelion: 2.9014 AU (434.04 Gm)
- Perihelion: 2.04926 AU (306.565 Gm)
- Semi-major axis: 2.47530 AU (370.300 Gm)
- Eccentricity: 0.17212
- Orbital period (sidereal): 3.89 yr (1422.5 d)
- Average orbital speed: 18.93 km/s
- Mean anomaly: 355.460°
- Mean motion: 0° 15^{m} 11.095^{s} / day
- Inclination: 5.1005°
- Longitude of ascending node: 148.454°
- Argument of perihelion: 140.006°
- Earth MOID: 1.03587 AU (154.964 Gm)
- Jupiter MOID: 2.2733 AU (340.08 Gm)
- T_{Jupiter}: 3.456

Physical characteristics
- Dimensions: 89.07±2.0 km
- Mass: (5.2±1.8)×10^{17} kg (Note: Calculated from its standard gravitational parameter GM = 0.035±0.012 km^{3}/s^{2}.)
- Mean density: 1.08 g/cm^{3} (Note: Assuming a diameter of 97.1 km.)
- Synodic rotation period: 12.054 h (0.5023 d)
- Geometric albedo: 0.0580±0.003; 0.058
- Spectral type: B–V = 0.624; U–B = 0.235; FP (Tholen); B (SMASS)
- Absolute magnitude (H): 8.96

335 Roberta is a large main belt asteroid. It was discovered on 1 September 1892, by German astronomer Anton Staus at Heidelberg Observatory. Roberta was the 12th asteroid that was discovered using photography, and the only asteroid discovery made by Staus.

Photometric observations of this asteroid from multiple sites during 2007 gave a light curve with a period of 12.054 ± 0.003 hours and a brightness variation of 0.13 ± 0.02 in magnitude. This agrees with a result reported in 1992, but differs from period estimates of 8.03 hours and 4.349 reported in 1987 and 2001, respectively.

Under the SMASS classification taxonomy, this asteroid is listed as a B-type; a group that combines both the Tholen B and F types. The spectrum of this object suggests the presence of magnetite (Fe_{3}O_{4}), which gives it the spectrally-blue coloration that is a characteristic of this SMASS class. The spectrum of this asteroid also displays a band feature near 2.9 μm that indicate the presence of a hydrated mineral. This suggests that the asteroid has undergone significant water-based alteration.

335 Roberta was identified as one of three asteroids that were likely to be a parent body for chondrites along with 449 Hamburga and 304 Olga. All three asteroids were known to have low-albedo (not reflect as much light) and be close to "meteorite producing resonances". Chrondrites are the most common type of meteor found on Earth, accounting for over 80% of all meteors. They are named for the tiny spherical silicate particles that are found inside them (those particles are called chondrules).
