= 449 Hamburga =

Carbonaceous asteroid

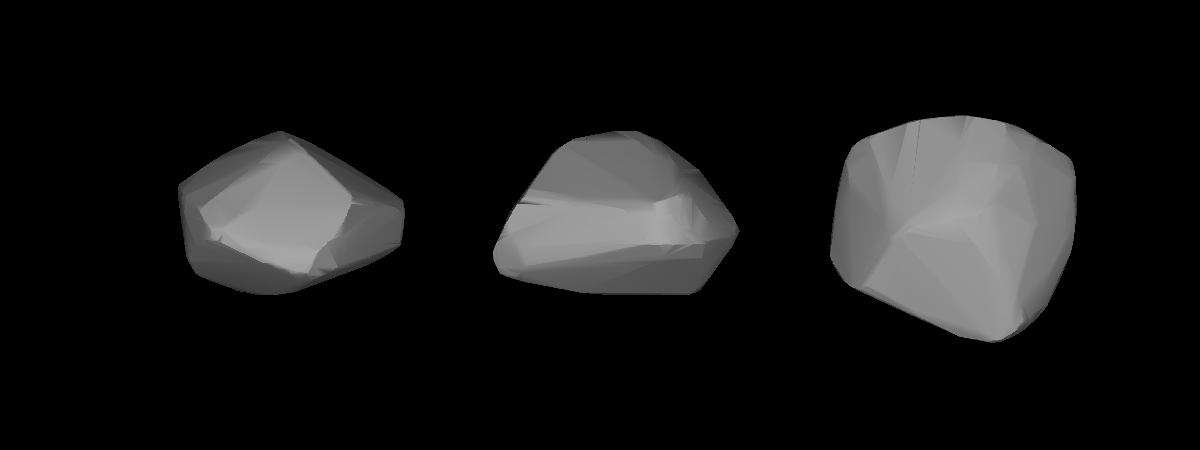
- Lightcurve-base 3D-model of 449 Hamburga.

Discovery
- Discovered by: M. F. Wolf; A. Schwassmann
- Discovery site: Heidelberg Obs.
- Discovery date: 31 October 1899

Designations
- Pronunciation: /hæmˈbɜːrɡə/
- Named after: Hamburg (German city)
- Alternative designations: 1899 EU · 1947 OA; 1948 TO · A901 EA
- Minor planet category: main-belt · (middle) background

Orbital characteristics
- Epoch 4 September 2017 (JD 2458000.5)
- Uncertainty parameter 0
- Observation arc: 117.91 yr (43,066 days)
- Aphelion: 2.9931 AU
- Perihelion: 2.1097 AU
- Semi-major axis: 2.5514 AU
- Eccentricity: 0.1731
- Orbital period (sidereal): 4.08 yr (1,489 days)
- Mean anomaly: 228.86°
- Mean motion: 0° 14^{m} 30.48^{s} / day
- Inclination: 3.0847°
- Longitude of ascending node: 85.923°
- Argument of perihelion: 47.281°

Physical characteristics
- Mean diameter: 66.76 ± 4.82 km (composite estimate) Individual estimates: 55.09±14.25 km; 63.61±0.75 km; 77.90±22.29 km; 80.83±17.91 km; 85.59±1.9 km
- Mass: (4.3±1.6)×10^{17} kg (Note: Calculated from its standard gravitational parameter GM = 0.029±0.011 km^{3}/s^{2}.)
- Mean density: 1.32 g/cm^{3} (Note: Assuming a diameter of 85.6 km.)
- Synodic rotation period: 18.145±0.005 h 18.263±0.004 h
- Geometric albedo: 0.03±0.02; 0.033±0.009; 0.0393±0.002; 0.07±0.02; 0.072±0.002
- Spectral type: Tholen = C · C B–V = 0.701; U–B = 0.378
- Absolute magnitude (H): 9.43±0.01 · 9.47 · 9.79 · 9.79±0.07 · 9.80

449 Hamburga is a carbonaceous asteroid from the background population of the intermediate asteroid belt, approximately 75 kilometers in diameter. It was discovered by German astronomers Max Wolf and Friedrich Schwassmann at Heidelberg Observatory on 31 October 1899, and later named after the city of Hamburg in Germany.

449 Hamburga was a proposed target for the 1980s–1990s space probe mission proposal CRAF.

== Description ==
Hamburga is classified as a C-type asteroid and is probably composed of carbonaceous material. It is named for the city of Hamburg in Germany. The name was announced in 1901 during a festival held by the Mathematical Society of Hamburg.

449 Hamburga was identified as one of three asteroids that were likely to be a parent body for chondrites along with 304 Olga and 335 Roberta. All three asteroids were known to have low-albedo (not reflect as much light) and be close to "meteorite producing resonances". Chrondrites are the most common type of meteor found on Earth, accounting for over 80% of all meteors. They are named for the tiny spherical silicate particles that are found inside them (those particles are called chondrules).

== Proposed spacecraft visit ==
In the 1980s and 1990s, NASA considered a spacecraft mission to the asteroid. The mission plan called for a launch in 1995 and a flyby of Hamburga in early 1998. The McDonald's chain of restaurants expressed an interest in sponsoring the mission, due to the accidental similarity of the asteroid's name to the food item "hamburger", which was discussed in exploratory meetings between themselves and NASA.

In August 1988 in the United States' city of Baltimore, P. Weissman addressed the International Astronomical Union on a mission to this asteroid (449), a mission which also include a rendezvous with Comet Kopf. See Comet Rendezvous Asteroid Flyby for more on the mission to the comet. This mission can also be compared to Rosetta, which successfully flew by two minor planets and orbited a Comet during its approach to the Sun in the early 21st century. P. Weissman later worked on the Rosetta mission.

== Study ==
It was predicted that 449 Hamburga occulted the star HIP 1424 in July 2013. Stellar occultations can allow a chord to be calculated.

An asteroid occultation was predicted for 18 Oct 2018 with the magnitude 12 star UCAC4-557-042266.

449 Hamburga has been observed to occult 15 stars between 1998 and 2023.

== See also ==
- List of asteroids formerly targeted for spacecraft visitation
- Comet Rendezvous Asteroid Flyby
- 723 Hammonia (also named for the city of Hamburg)
- List of minor planets: 1–1000 (approx. 1801–1923)
