= 22P/Kopff =

Jupiter-family comet

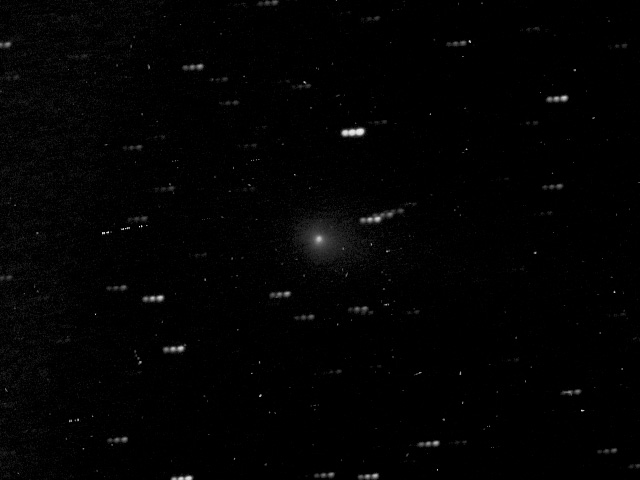
- Comet Kopff photographed from a 14" reflector telescope on 27 June 2009

Discovery
- Discovered by: August Kopff
- Discovery site: Königstuhl Observatory
- Discovery date: 23 August 1906

Designations
- MPC designation: P/1906 Q1, P/1919 O1
- Alternative designations: 1906 IV, 1919 I, 1926 II; 1932 III, 1939 II, 1945 V; 1951 VII, 1958 I, 1964 III; 1970 XI, 1977 V; 1983 XIII, 1990 I

Orbital characteristics
- Epoch: 31 March 2024 (JD 2460400.5)
- Observation arc: 119.34 years (Note: Observation arc from the Minor Planet Center database covering dates from 23 August 1906 until 27 December 2025.)
- Number of observations: 6,340
- Aphelion: 5.32 AU
- Perihelion: 1.54 AU (epoch 2024); 1.32 AU (real-world) (Note: 2 years, 2 months and 3 days before the 2028 perihelion passage, the comet will pass 0.439 AU (65.7 million km) from Jupiter.)
- Semi-major axis: 3.43 AU
- Eccentricity: 0.551
- Orbital period: 6.357 years
- Inclination: 4.753°
- Longitude of ascending node: 120.58°
- Argument of periapsis: 162.92°
- Mean anomaly: 115.26°
- Last perihelion: 18 March 2022
- Next perihelion: 28 June 2028
- T_{Jupiter}: 2.866
- Earth MOID: 0.539 AU
- Jupiter MOID: 0.08 AU

Physical characteristics
- Mean radius: 1.89±0.18 km
- Mean density: 500±80 kg/m^{3}
- Synodic rotation period: 12.3±0.8 hours
- Geometric albedo: 0.042±0.01
- Comet total magnitude (M1): 11.9

Comet Kopff or 22P/Kopff is a Jupiter-family comet with a 6.36-year orbit around the Sun. Discovered on 23 August 1906, it was named after its discoverer, August Kopff. The comet was missed on its November 1912 return, but was recovered in June 1919 and has been seen at every apparition since. Close approaches to Jupiter in 1938 and 1943 decreased the perihelion distance and orbital period. 22P/Kopff's last perihelion passage was 18 March 2022.

It will pass 0.439 AU (65.7 million km) from Jupiter on 25 April 2026, then come to perihelion on 28 June 2028 at 1.32 AU from the Sun, and then pass 0.353 AU (52.8 million km) from Earth on 13 July 2028.

== Observational history ==
Perihelion distance at different epochs
| Epoch | Perihelion (AU) |
| 1844 | 3.04 |
| 1851 | 2.02 (Note: Around 2–6 October 1847, which was 59 years before discovery, the comet passed about 0.015 AU (2 million km) from Jupiter.) |
| 1906 | 1.70 |
| 1945 | 1.50 |
| 1958 | 1.52 |
| 1990 | 1.59 |
| 2028 | 1.32 |
| 2040 | 1.19 |

22P/Kopff was discovered at Königstuhl Observatory on Heidelberg, Germany. Kopff analyzed photographic plates which he exposed on August 20, 1903, against pre-discovery images of the same region. On August 23, 1903, Kopff concluded it to be a comet with an estimated apparent magnitude of 11. On mid-September 1906, the short-period nature of the comet was recognized by a team headed by Kiel Ebell of the Berkeley Astronomical Department. The comet was missed when it made a return on November 25, 1912, however on June 25, 1919, astronomers recovered the comet. The comet was located less than three days from the predicted position. Over the next several returns to Earth, none were notable until the 1945 comet's return when the comet peaked at magnitude 8.5. The increase in brightness was a result of Jupiter altering the comet's orbit between the years of 1939 to 1945. This change in orbit brought the comet closer to the Sun. The 1951 return was unique due to the comet being 3 magnitudes fainter than what was expected when recovered in April 1951. But the comet still reached magnitude 10.5 in October 1951. A very close pass to Jupiter in 1954 increased the comet's perihelion distance to 1.52 AU and increased the orbital period to 6.31 years. On November 30, 1994, Carl W. Hergenrother was able to recover the comet at a stellar magnitude of 22.8 using the 1.5-m reflector at the Catalina Sky Survey. The comet reached magnitude 7 during the 1996 perihelion passage.

1847 Jupiter approach estimates
| Date | Jupiter distance | Source |
|---|---|---|
| 1847-10-02 | 0.015 AU (2.2 million km; 1.4 million mi) | Kinoshita |
| 1847-10-06 | 0.009 AU (1.3 million km; 0.84 million mi) | JPL Horizons |

== Physical characteristics ==
The comet nucleus is estimated to be 3.78 km (2.35 mi) in diameter, with an albedo of 0.042. The nucleus is dark because hydrocarbons on the surface have been converted to a dark, tarry like substance by solar ultraviolet radiation.

== Exploration ==
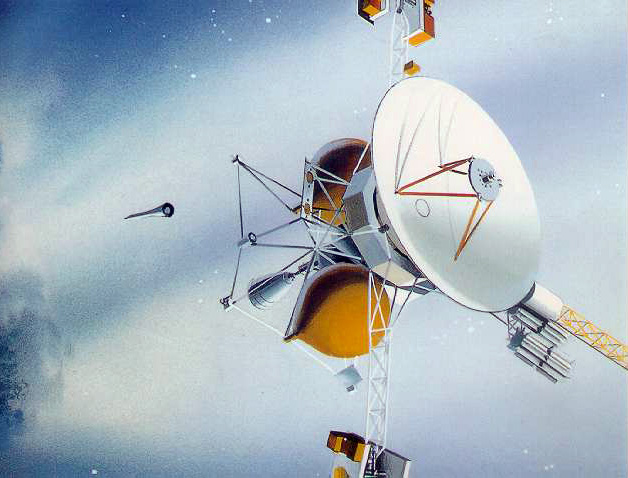
Artist's impression of the CRAF mission at 22P/Kopff

22P/Kopff was the planned target for the joint NASA/ESA Comet Rendezvous Asteroid Flyby (CRAF) mission. This Mariner Mark II spacecraft would have been launched in February 1996 and after a flyby of Earth and 449 Hamburga, CRAF would have reached 22P/Kopff by August 2001, studying the comet for another two years. The CRAF mission was developed in tandem with the Cassini–Huygens mission. It was cancelled due to cost overruns in 1992.

In 2000, a comet orbiter named Odyssey was proposed for NASA's Discovery Program to rendezvous and orbit 22P/Kopff by September 2009, launching from a Delta II rocket on June 2006. However, it was not selected in favor of Dawn and Kepler.

== Notes ==
Numbered comets
| Previous; 21P/Giacobini–Zinner | 22P/Kopff | Next; 23P/Brorsen–Metcalf |
