= 304 Olga =

Large Main belt asteroid

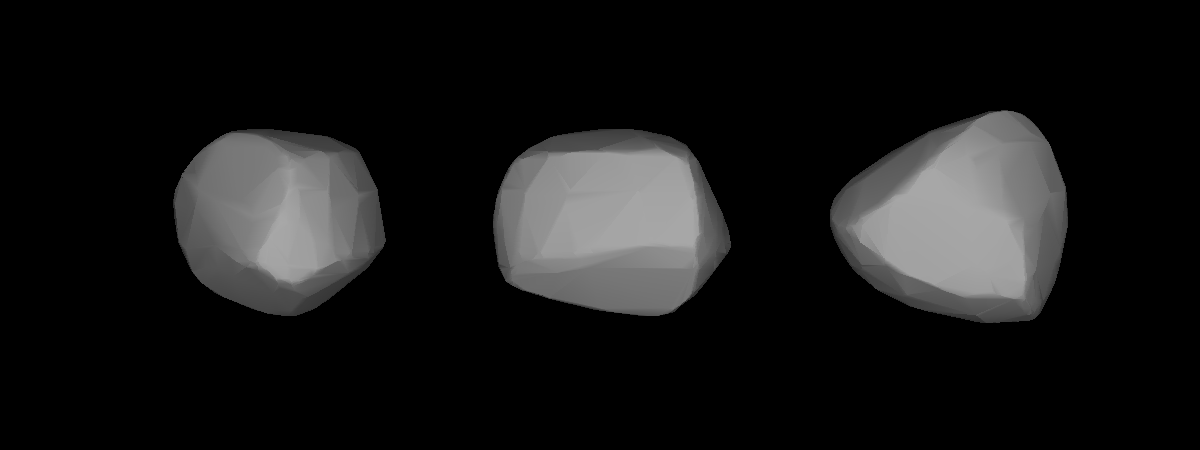
- Lightcurve-based 3D model of 304 Olga

Discovery
- Discovered by: Johann Palisa
- Discovery date: 14 February 1891

Designations
- Pronunciation: /ˈɒlɡə/, German: [ˈɔlɡaː]
- Alternative designations: A891 CB; 1952 SJ
- Minor planet category: Main belt

Orbital characteristics
- Epoch 31 July 2016 (JD 2457600.5)
- Uncertainty parameter 0
- Observation arc: 124.78 yr (45577 d)
- Aphelion: 2.93719 AU (439.397 Gm)
- Perihelion: 1.86853 AU (279.528 Gm)
- Semi-major axis: 2.40286 AU (359.463 Gm)
- Eccentricity: 0.22237
- Orbital period (sidereal): 3.72 yr (1360.5 d)
- Mean anomaly: 63.6148°
- Mean motion: 0° 15^{m} 52.607^{s} / day
- Inclination: 15.8530°
- Longitude of ascending node: 159.080°
- Argument of perihelion: 172.423°

Physical characteristics
- Dimensions: 67.86±2.1 km 70.30 ± 2.32 km
- Mass: (1.15 ± 1.12) × 10^{18} kg
- Synodic rotation period: 18.36 h (0.765 d)
- Geometric albedo: 0.0488±0.003
- Spectral type: C
- Absolute magnitude (H): 9.74

304 Olga is a large Main belt asteroid. It is classified as a C-type asteroid and is probably composed of carbonaceous material.

It was discovered by Johann Palisa on 14 February 1891 in Vienna.

304 Olga was identified as one of three asteroids that were likely to be a parent body for chondrites along with 449 Hamburga and 335 Roberta. All three asteroids were known to have low-albedo (not reflect as much light) and be close to "meteorite producing resonances". Chrondrites are the most common type of meteor found on Earth, accounting for over 80% of all meteors. They are named for the tiny spherical silicate particles that are found inside them (those particles are called chondrules).

Orbit diagram

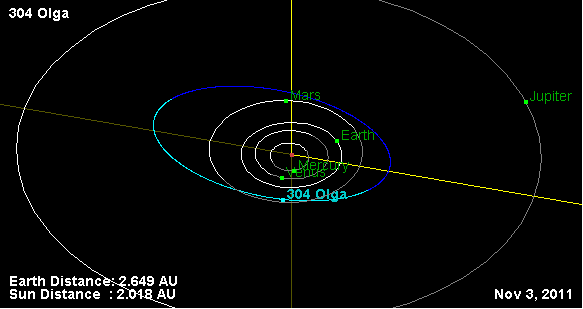

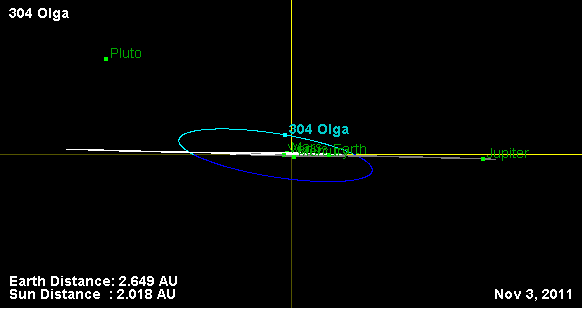
