= Hibernation (spaceflight) =

Spaceflight concept

Hibernation of spacecraft is an operating mode used when regular operations are suspended for an extended period of time but restarting is expected (unlike termination). On long duration and deep space missions it saves power or other limited resources and extends mission life. The term is substantially similar to the hibernation mode used in computer power saving.

- Rosetta, a mission to study comet 67P/Churyumov–Gerasimenko (67P), was placed into hibernation for 31 months to conserve its limited resources when it ventured near the orbit of Jupiter while en route to its rendezvous.
- The New Horizons mission entered hibernation mode many times on its way to Pluto and then again while en route to the Kuiper belt object 486958 Arrokoth. Its hibernation mode provides some amount of health and status monitoring and occasional wake-ups to check and calibrate instruments.
- NASA's Wide-field Infrared Survey Explorer mission, originally operated by the agency's astrophysics division for an infrared all-sky survey, was placed into hibernation in 2011 and then reawakened in 2013 to conduct an asteroid survey by the planetary science division.
