= 1073 Gellivara =

Asteroid

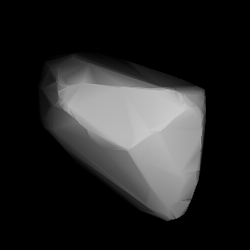
- Shape model of Gellivara from its lightcurve

Discovery
- Discovered by: J. Palisa
- Discovery site: Vienna Obs.
- Discovery date: 14 September 1923

Designations
- Named after: Gällivare (Swedish town)
- Alternative designations: 1923 OW · 1929 UJ; 1932 EP · 1951 QL
- Minor planet category: main-belt · (outer); Themis

Orbital characteristics
- Epoch 4 September 2017 (JD 2458000.5)
- Uncertainty parameter 0
- Observation arc: 93.54 yr (34,165 days)
- Aphelion: 3.7925 AU
- Perihelion: 2.5826 AU
- Semi-major axis: 3.1875 AU
- Eccentricity: 0.1898
- Orbital period (sidereal): 5.69 yr (2,079 days)
- Mean anomaly: 248.01°
- Mean motion: 0° 10^{m} 23.52^{s} / day
- Inclination: 1.6043°
- Longitude of ascending node: 39.579°
- Argument of perihelion: 289.05°

Physical characteristics
- Dimensions: 22.10±5.77 km 22.71±7.49 km 25.992±0.336 km 26.87±0.79 km 35.73±3.4 km 35.76 km (derived)
- Synodic rotation period: 11.32±0.05 h
- Geometric albedo: 0.0241±0.005; 0.0289 (derived); 0.045±0.003; 0.0454±0.0047; 0.07±0.04; 0.07±0.08
- Spectral type: C (assumed)
- Absolute magnitude (H): 11.70 · 11.73 · 11.82±0.26 · 11.90

1073 Gellivara, provisional designation 1923 OW, is a dark Themistian asteroid, approximately 27 kilometers (17 miles) in diameter, located in the outer regions of the asteroid belt. It was discovered by Austrian astronomer Johann Palisa at the Vienna Observatory on 14 September 1923, and later named after the Swedish town of Gällivare.

== Orbit and classification ==
Gellivara is a Themistian asteroid that belongs to the Themis family (602), a very large family of carbonaceous asteroids, named after 24 Themis. It orbits the Sun in the outer asteroid belt at a distance of 2.6–3.8 AU once every 5 years and 8 months (2,079 days; semi-major axis of 3.19 AU). Its orbit has an eccentricity of 0.19 and an inclination of 2° with respect to the ecliptic. The body's observation arc begins at Vienna on 1 October 1923, two weeks after its official discovery observation.

== Naming ==
This minor planet was named by Austrian astronomer Joseph Rheden with the consent of the discoverer's second wife, Anna Palisa, after the small Swedish town of Gällivare in Lapland, where astronomers witnessed the total eclipse of the Sun in 1927. Gellivara was the discoverer's last discovery. The official naming citation was mentioned in The Names of the Minor Planets by Paul Herget in 1955 (H 101).

== Physical characteristics ==
Gellivara is an assumed carbonaceous C-type asteroid, which agrees with the overall spectral type of the Themis family.

=== Rotation period ===
In November 2008, a rotational lightcurve of Gellivara was obtained from photometric observations by American astronomer Robert Stephens at the Goat Mountain Astronomical Research Station (G79) in California. Lightcurve analysis gave a rotation period of 11.32 hours with a brightness amplitude of 0.35 magnitude (U=2).

=== Diameter and albedo ===
According to the surveys carried out by the Infrared Astronomical Satellite IRAS, the Japanese Akari satellite and the NEOWISE mission of NASA's Wide-field Infrared Survey Explorer, Gellivara measures between 22.10 and 35.73 kilometers in diameter and its surface has an albedo between 0.0241 and 0.07. The Collaborative Asteroid Lightcurve Link agrees with IRAS and derives an albedo of 0.0289 with a diameter of 35.76 kilometers based on an absolute magnitude of 11.7.
