= Comet Rendezvous Asteroid Flyby =

Cancelled NASA mission to explore Comet 22P/Kopff

Comet Rendezvous Asteroid Flyby (CRAF)
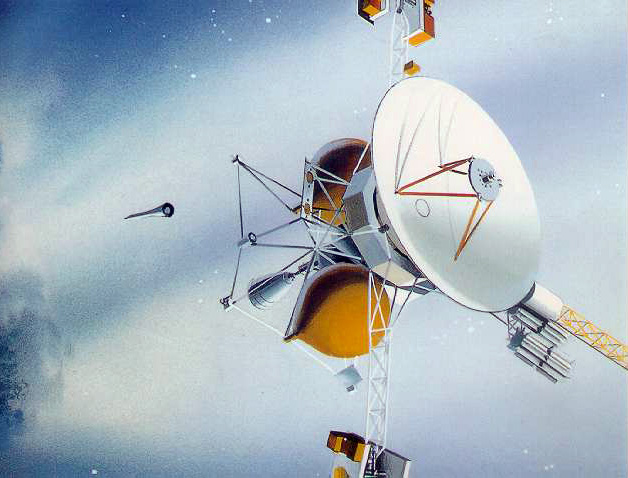
- Conceptual artwork of the CRAF spacecraft deploying a penetrator towards the nucleus of comet 22P/Kopff
- Mission type: Comet / asteroid exploration
- Operator: NASA
- Website: nssdc.gsfc.nasa.gov
- Mission duration: Cancelled

Spacecraft properties
- Launch mass: 6,360 kg (14,020 lb)
- Dry mass: 2,060 kg (4,540 lb)
- Payload mass: 290 kg (640 lb)
- Power: 170 kilowatts

Start of mission
- Launch date: February 1996; Planned
- Rocket: Titan IV(401)B/ Centaur-T
- Launch site: Cape Canaveral

Flyby of Earth
- Closest approach: July 1997; Planned

Flyby of 449 Hamburga
- Closest approach: January 1998; Planned

Rendezvous with 22P/Kopff
- Arrival date: August 2001; Planned

The Comet Rendezvous Asteroid Flyby (CRAF) was a cancelled plan for a NASA-led exploratory mission designed by the Jet Propulsion Laboratory during the mid-to-late 1980s and early 1990s, that planned to send a spacecraft to encounter an asteroid and then to rendezvous with a comet and fly alongside it for nearly three years. The project was eventually canceled when it went over budget; most of the remaining funds were redirected to the Saturn mission Cassini–Huygens, allowing that mission to survive congressional budget cutbacks. Most of CRAF's scientific objectives were later accomplished by the smaller NASA spacecraft Stardust and Deep Impact, and by ESA's flagship Rosetta mission.

== Overview ==
Designed to be the first of the planned Mariner Mark II series of spacecraft, CRAF was to closely examine a comet during a part of its orbit around the Sun. It was to launch a heavily instrumented penetrator/lander into the comet's nucleus to measure temperatures and chemical composition. CRAF's other instruments would collect data on the comet's nucleus, its coma, and its dust and ion cloud and tail. CRAF was also to provide the first close-up look at how a comet's coma and its tail of dust and ions form. CRAF and Cassini missions were a collaborative project of NASA, the European Space Agency and the federal space agencies of Germany and Italy, as well as the United States Air Force and the United States Department of Energy.

CRAF was to be launched aboard a Titan IV-Centaur rocket in August 1995, but as of February 1991 the launch date was swapped with Cassini and CRAF's launch was moved back to February 1996. The new launch profile included a Venus gravity assist, that added eight months to the planned flight time but offered an increase in payload and better alternatives if the February 1996 launch window were missed. The trajectory would carry CRAF out to the asteroid belt, where a propulsion maneuver would send the spacecraft back toward Earth for a gravity assist boost. CRAF would fly past the Earth in July 1997 to take up its final flight path. By using gravity assist, NASA can launch spacecraft aboard rockets that have less thrust than would be needed for a direct flight.

The spacecraft was to encounter an asteroid named 449 Hamburga in January 1998 en route to the comet. CRAF would take photographs and deploy other scientific measurements during the encounter period. Asteroid 449 Hamburga is about 88 kilometers (55 mi) in diameter and is thought to be a carbonaceous type asteroid.

CRAF's planned cometary target was Comet Kopff. This was named for August Kopff, who discovered it on August 22, 1906, during an observing session at Koenigstuhl Observatory near Heidelberg, Germany.

Ninety-four years after Kopff's discovery, CRAF would arrive at the rendezvous point with Comet Kopff — in August 2000. Comet and spacecraft would be at the distance of Jupiter's orbit, and 850 days before closest approach to the Sun, or perihelion. CRAF would fire its penetrator/lander at the comet in August 2001, then would continue to fly beside Kopff. The spacecraft would take data for a total of two and two-thirds years, until about 109 days after they pass closest to the Sun and are outward bound again. It was to be the first time a spacecraft would have flown in formation with a comet, though a U.S. spacecraft, International Cometary Explorer (ICE), flew by Comet Giacobini-Zinner in 1985, spacecraft from several countries encountered Comet Halley in 1986, and the Giotto spacecraft flew past Comet Grigg-Skjellerup in 1992.

The comet rendezvous would allow study of matter that scientists think is the original, relatively unchanged material left behind when a cloud of dust and gas collapsed to form the Solar System 4.6 billion years ago. Scientists believe comets now reside in a distant region of the Solar System called the Oort cloud. Current theory holds that gravitational nudges from stars in the Sun's neighborhood send some comets from the Oort cloud falling toward the Sun.

The CRAF spacecraft would fly extremely close to the comet's nucleus, within 10 kilometers (6.2 mi). The close-up exploration would take place before the coma and tail begin to build, it would observe the nucleus as it becomes active in the growing sunlight and begins to have its lighter elements boil off and form a coma and tails. Later the spacecraft would move in and out through the coma and down the tail to study their properties and the complex processes occurring in them, and to collect samples of dust for detailed analysis on board the spacecraft.

In December 2002 the spacecraft and the comet would make their closest approach to the Sun. They would then head outward again toward aphelion near Jupiter's orbit. On March 31, 2003, the Comet Rendezvous Asteroid Flyby, first primary mission of Mariner Mark II, would end. At that time the Cassini mission, with the second Mariner Mark II spacecraft, would be in its Saturnian-tour phase.

== Spacecraft design ==
Mariner Mark II class spacecraft developed for NASA by JPL were a new design approach advocated by NASA's Solar System Exploration Committee and were intended for flights in the 1990s to the outer planets and primitive bodies, such as comets and asteroids.

CRAF was to be the first Mariner Mark II mission. The second mission, called Saturn Orbiter Titan Probe or SOTP (later Cassini–Huygens), was a Saturn orbiter with a probe designed to plunge into the atmosphere of the ringed planet's largest satellite, Titan. CRAF and SOTP were to use identical Mariner Mark II spacecraft, but each was to carry unique science instruments.

=== Instrumentation ===
All of the phenomena associated with comets were to be examined by CRAF's instruments. And because of the long duration of the planned rendezvous — almost three years — it was expected to fill in many of the major gaps in scientific understanding of the strange objects.

The mission's scientific payload was selected in October 1986. It was to include:

- Cameras to photograph the nucleus, coma and tail, and changes that occur as Kopff orbits the Sun. Photos also would help scientists determine the comet's size and structure, the location of its poles, its rotation rate and geological structure.
- A surface penetrator-lander to be fired into Kopff's nucleus. The instruments aboard the penetrator-lander would collect a sample of cometary ices, study how they change when heated, and perform a chemical analysis of the gases released from the ice. The penetrator would bury its tip, which will contain a gamma-ray spectrometer measuring abundances of as many as 20 chemical elements, up to one meter (three feet) below the comet's surface. The penetrator was to carry accelerometers to determine Kopff's surface strength and its resistance to puncture, and thermometers to measure temperatures beneath the surface. The penetrator/lander would radio its findings to the spacecraft, which will then relay them to Earth.
- Mass spectrometers to study composition of gases released by the nucleus and the cloud of plasma (ionized gas) surrounding the nucleus.
- Dust counters, collectors and analyzers to capture samples of the comet's dust and study them on board. The information would help scientists determine the chemical elements that make up the dust and ice. In addition, the mass, size, shape and composition of individual dust grains will be measured.
- A visual and infrared mapping spectrometer to study chemical composition of the coma and the surface of the nucleus as they change with time.
- A magnetometer and a plasma-wave analyzer to measure interactions between the coma and electrically charged particles streaming from the Sun. The magnetometer was also to measure the comet's intrinsic magnetic field, if it has one.

== See also ==
- List of minor planets and comets visited by spacecraft
- Deep Impact (spacecraft) (Comet flyby and impact probe, completed)
- Rosetta (Comet lander and orbiter, completed 2016)
- Champollion (spacecraft) (A cancelled comet lander mission)
