= Pluto Kuiper Express =

Cancelled NASA flyby mission to Pluto

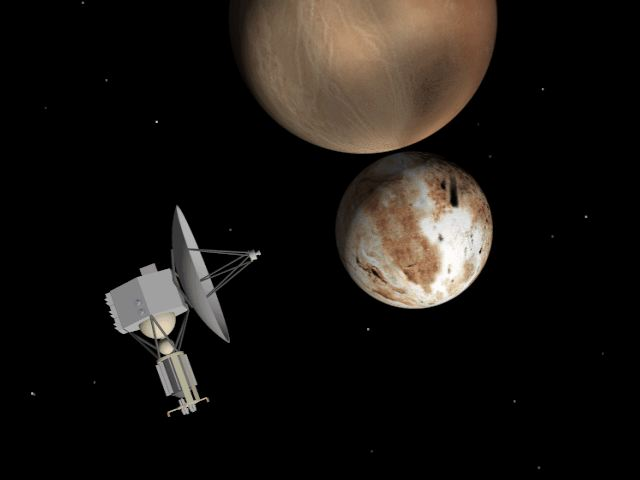
- Artist's impression of Pluto Kuiper Express encountering the Pluto–Charon system
- Names: Pluto Fast Flyby (1992–1995); Pluto Kuiper Express (1995–2000)
- Mission type: Pluto flyby
- Operator: NASA
- Mission duration: Cancelled

Spacecraft properties
- Launch mass: 220 kg (490 lb)
- Payload mass: 7 kg (15 lb)
- Power: 228 watts

Start of mission
- Launch date: December 2004
- Rocket: Delta II or Space Shuttle

Flyby of Jupiter
- Closest approach: April–June 2006

Flyby of Pluto
- Closest approach: December 2012
- Distance: 15,000 km (9,300 mi)

Transponders
- Bandwidth: 5-Mbit/s

Pluto Kuiper Express was an interplanetary space probe that was proposed by Jet Propulsion Laboratory (JPL) scientists and engineers and under development by NASA. The spacecraft was intended to be launched to study Pluto and its moon Charon, along with one or more other Kuiper belt objects (KBOs). The proposal was the third of its kind, after the Pluto 350 and a proposal to send a Mariner Mark II spacecraft to Pluto.

Originally conceived as Pluto Fast Flyby, and later briefly named Pluto Express, the mission was inspired by a 1991 United States Postal Service stamp that branded Pluto as "Not Yet Explored". The project brought on JPL engineers and students from the California Institute of Technology and, later, Alan Stern and other scientists from the Pluto 350 project. While the project was initiated in 1992, the project's development phase was lengthy, spending nearly a decade in the proposal and funding stage. During planning, the mission was changed to include a Kuiper belt object flyby and re-christened the Pluto Kuiper Express, after the discovery of numerous such objects beyond Neptune in the mid-to-late 1990s. NASA ultimately decided to cancel the mission in 2000, however, citing the project's expanding budget as the ultimate reason for the cancellation.

After the mission's cancellation, most of the Pluto Fast Flyby team, including Stern, went on to develop New Horizons, a mission nearly identical to Pluto Kuiper Express, for NASA's New Frontiers program. The spacecraft was successfully launched in January 2006, after a financial standoff with NASA and additional delays, and went on to perform the first ever flyby of the Pluto–Charon system in July 2015.

== History ==
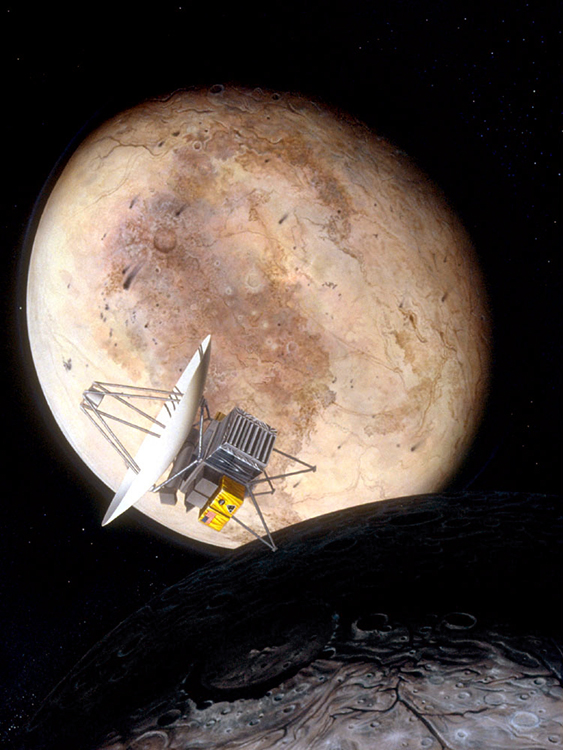
Artist's impression of Pluto Fast Flyby at Pluto and Charon.

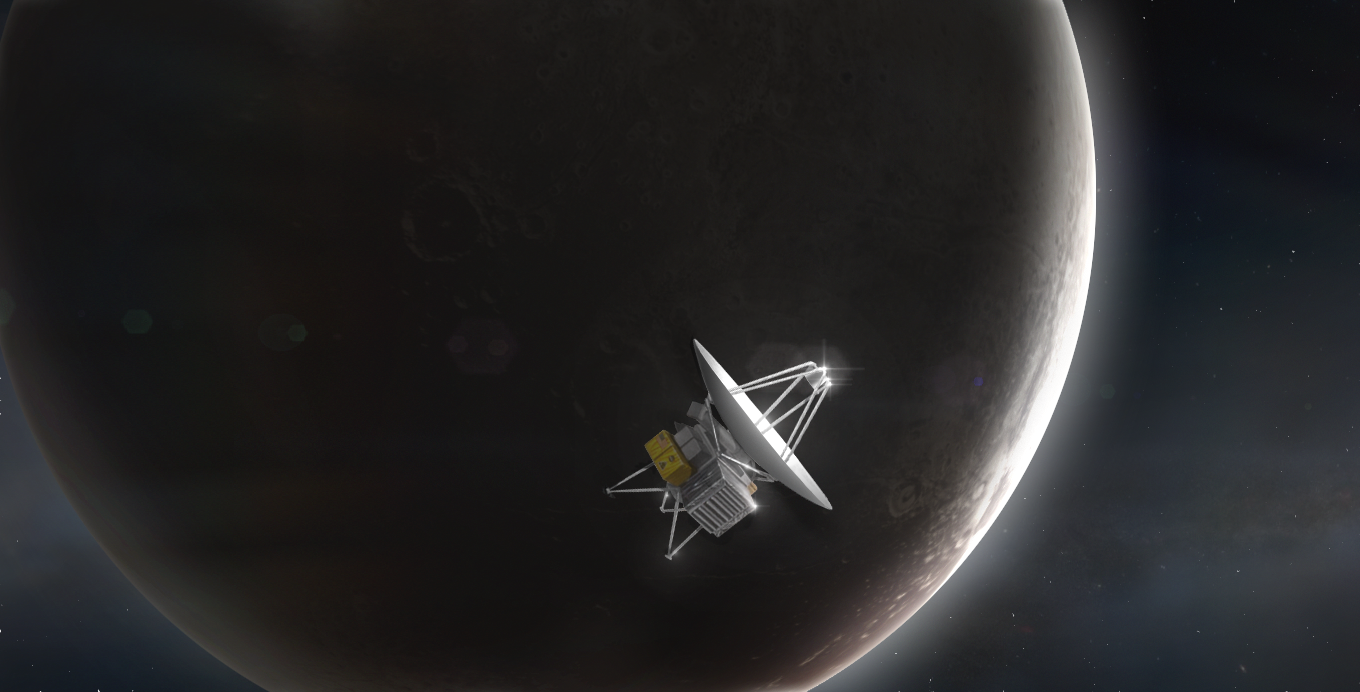
Artist's impression of Pluto Fast Flyby at Pluto.

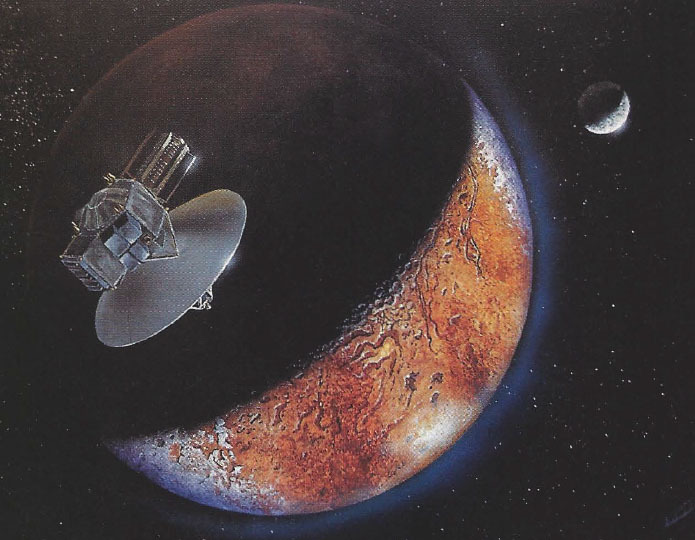
Artist's vision of Pluto Fast Flyby approaching Pluto's mottled surface. A tenuous, transient atmosphere is visible as blue haze beyond the bright limb while Pluto's companion Charon looms in the distance.

As proposed by Jet Propulsion Laboratory (JPL) in 1992, the Pluto Fast Flyby mission was to be two craft weighing 150 kg (330 lb) each. The voyage from Earth to Pluto was to take seven or eight years, with a launch as early as 1998. The two craft would be timed to view different sides of Pluto. The budget for the mission was said to be no more than $400-million, with NASA administrator Daniel Goldin wholeheartedly supporting the proposal.

By 1995, the proposed mission was known as Pluto Express, and pre-project manager Robert Staehle of JPL suggested a budget "in the neighborhood of $300 million". At this point the mission was still to have been twin spacecraft, and it was hoped it could be launched in 1998. NASA tried to negotiate with Russia for use of Proton rockets to launch the spacecraft, in exchange for carrying Russian "Drop Zond" probes to Pluto. Another idea, emanating from the Max Planck Institute, would have had Germany contribute funding for the launch, in exchange for Pluto Express carrying a German probe to be dropped at Io during the Jupiter gravity assist.

The timing of the mission was important, as it would have passed Pluto shortly before its atmosphere froze, which it was thought to do for a considerable part of its orbit. The mission's main objectives would have been to map Pluto's surface and examine the double system's geology and geomorphology, as well as determining the composition of Pluto's atmosphere. This last task would have been considerably more difficult after the start of atmospheric freezing. Scientific equipment on board would have included visible light imaging systems, infrared and ultraviolet spectrometers, and an ultrastable oscillator (USO) for use in a radio occultation experiment.

The spacecraft was to have been a simple hexagonal prism-shaped structure weighing some 220 kg (490 lb), powered by radioisotope thermal generators (RTGs) similar to those used on the Galileo and Cassini missions. On-board control and data collection would have been maintained by a 1.5 MIPS RISC-based computer system capable of processing data at 5 Mbit/s. This would have allowed for the transmission of over one gigabyte of data over a one-year period. Communications would have been via a fixed 1.47 m (4.8 ft) high-gain antenna, directionally corrected using a wide-field star tracker. Early in the mission's planning there was suggestion of combining efforts with the Russian space agency and including small Drop Zond probes to study the Plutonian atmosphere. This plan was later abandoned.

The Pluto Express was predicted to be launched in 2001, but it was not ready until late 2004. The spacecraft was to have been launched via either a Delta rocket or the Space Shuttle, most likely in December 2004. Had that happened, the only option would have been to use a Delta rocket, as the Shuttle fleet was grounded after the Columbia disaster. The course would have been initially via Jupiter, whose gravity well would have been used to increase the probe's velocity via a gravity assist. The closest approach distance to Pluto would have been about 15,000 km (9,300 mi) at 17–18 km/s, so as to allow for 1.0 km (0.62 mi) resolution mapping. After passing Pluto, the spacecraft would have used its imaging camera to search for Kuiper Belt objects.

In September 2000 NASA ceased work on the Pluto-Kuiper Express mission, although the agency said it was being "rethought and replanned", not scrapped. The mission's cost at that time was said by a NASA spokesperson to be an unaffordable $500 million (compared to an original budget of $350 million in 1999).
