= Mariner Mark II =

Planned family of uncrewed NASA spacecraft

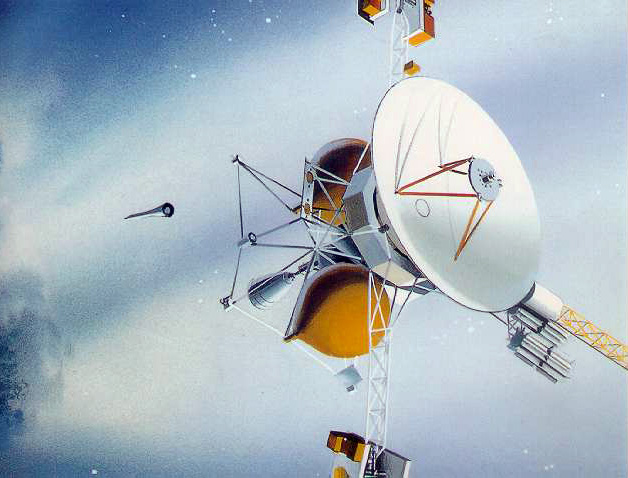
Conceptual artwork of the CRAF spacecraft based on Mariner Mark II

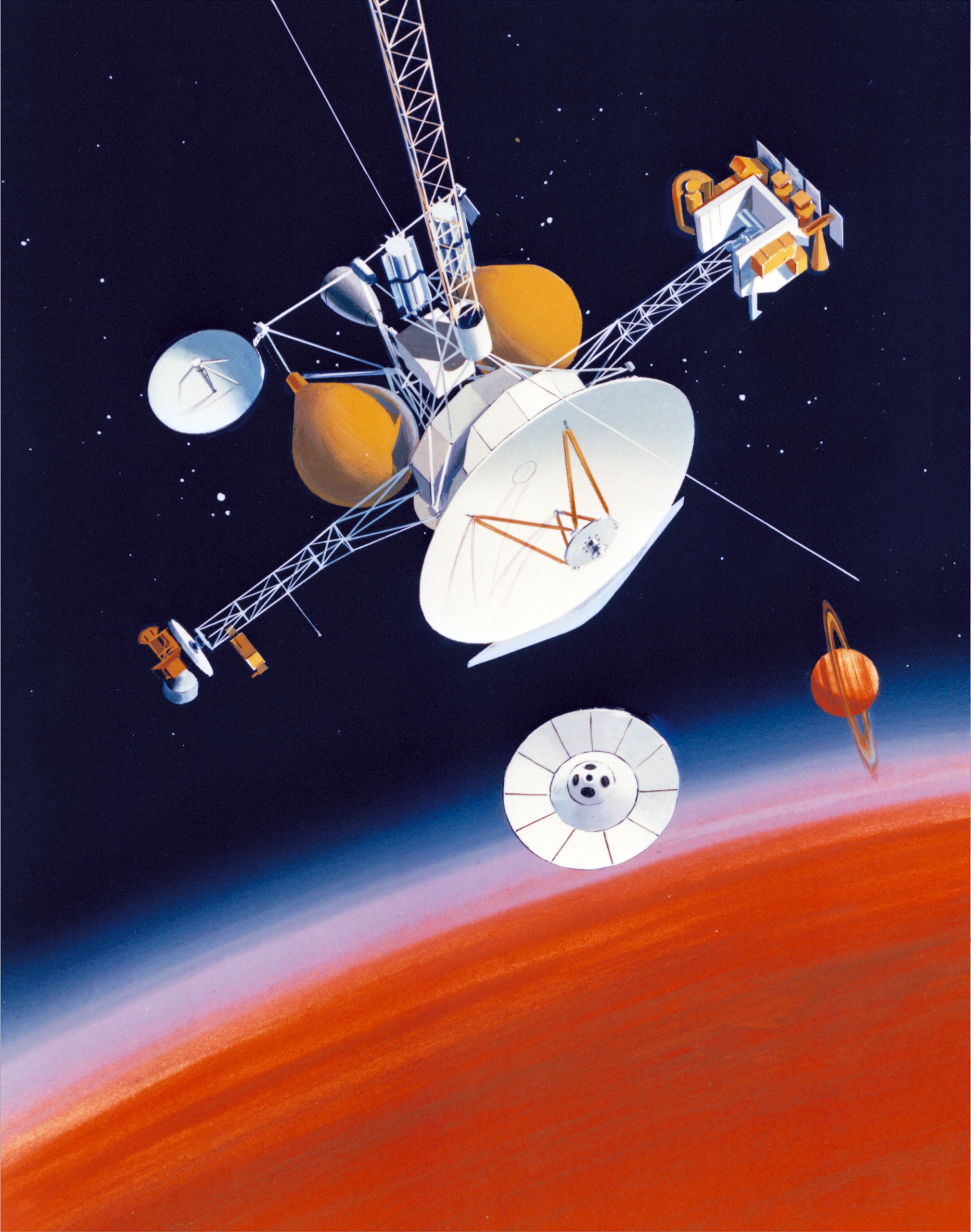
SOTP a Mariner Mark II spacecraft concept, drawing from 1988. Later redesigned to the Cassini–Huygens spacecraft

Mariner Mark II was NASA's planned family of uncrewed spacecraft for the exploration of the outer Solar System that were to be developed and operated by JPL between 1980 and 2010.

== Summary ==
After the "flagship" multibillion-dollar missions of the 1970s, in the 1980s NASA was looking for a new, more affordable direction for the 1990s and beyond. Two projects were conceived by NASA's Solar System Exploration Committee in 1983, the Planetary Observer program, and Mariner Mark II.

The Observer program, starting with the Mars Observer, was envisioned as a series of low-cost missions to the inner Solar System, based on commercial Earth satellites, while the Mariner Mark II was to be a series of large spacecraft for the exploration of the outer Solar System.

Mariner Mark II spacecraft were to use common design, hardware and software solutions, much of it derived from previous missions such as Voyager and Galileo as well as select new technologies, such as advanced gyroscopes, all with the aim of cutting costs. It was hoped that this new approach would reduce the mission costs to about $400 million each, about half the price of Galileo.

The first two missions of the project were to be a mission to Saturn and its moon Titan, the Saturn Orbiter/Titan Probe, or SOTP (later Cassini) and the Comet Rendezvous Asteroid Flyby (CRAF), both of which were approved by Congress in 1990.

Other planned Mariner Mark II-based spacecraft were an ESA led follow-on to CRAF, the Comet Nucleus Sample Return or CNSR (later Rosetta, without the sample return); Pluto Fast Flyby, a flyby of Pluto (later Pluto Kuiper Express, eventually realized as New Horizons); and a Neptune Orbiter with an atmospheric probe.

However, congressionally imposed reductions to FY 1992–93 funding requirements forced NASA to terminate the CRAF mission and to delay the Cassini launch from April 1996 to October 1997. In order to save it, NASA was forced to significantly redesign Cassini to reduce the total program cost, mass and power requirements.

NASA has had to replace the Mariner Mark II program with the lower-cost Discovery Program.

== See also ==
- Mariner program
- Voyager program
- Pioneer program
