= Asteroidal water =

Water and its precursors in asteroids

Asteroidal water is water or water precursor deposits such as hydroxide (OH^{−}) that exist in asteroids (i.e., small Solar System bodies (SSSBs) not explicitly in the subcategory of comets). The "snow line" of the Solar System lies outside of the main asteroid belt, and the majority of water is expected in minor planets (e.g. Kuiper belt objects (KBOs) and Centaurs). Nevertheless, a significant amount of water is also found inside the snow line, including in near-Earth objects (NEOs).

The formation of asteroidal water mirrors that of water formation in the Solar System, either from transfer via bombardment, migration, ejection, or other means. Asteroidal water has recently been pursued as a resource to support deep space exploration activities, for example, for use as a rocket propellant, human consumption, or for agricultural production.

== History ==
=== Meteorites ===
Since the early 1800s, meteorites have been assumed to be "space rocks", not terrestrial or atmospheric phenomena. At this time, asteroids were first discovered, then in increasing numbers and categories.

Many meteorites show signs of previous water. The petrological scale, numbered 1 through 7, indicates increasing aqueous alteration from type 2 to 1. Signs of water include phyllosilicates ("clay" and serpentinites), sulfides and sulfates, and carbonates, as well as structural signs: veins, and alteration or total erasure of individual chondrules.

Some meteorites, particularly the CI class, currently contain water. As these include both finds (with their Earth entry and impact unobserved) and falls (meteorites from a known, recent meteor event), that water cannot be entirely terrestrial contamination. As the precision of isotopic abundance analyses grew, they confirmed that meteorite water differs from Earth water. As water at Earth (especially its atmosphere) is well-mixed, significantly different isotope levels would indicate a separate water source.

Water content of the CI and CM types are often in double-digit percentages.

Much telescopic observation and hypothesizing attempted to link meteorite classes to asteroid types. The Galileo and NEAR missions then established S-type asteroids as the parent bodies of ordinary chondrites; the Dawn mission confirmed hypotheses that 4 Vesta was the HED parent. Ongoing projects are sending spacecraft to C-, M-, D-, and P-type bodies.

=== Versus comets ===
The planets, and to an extent the asteroid belt, were previously held to be static and unchanging; the belt was a former or stalled planet.

In the late 1860s, Hubert Newton and Giovanni Schiaparelli simultaneously showed that meteor showers (and by implication, meteorites) were comet debris.

After the discovery of many near-Earth asteroids, not in the belt, it was apparent they had planet-crossing, unstable orbits. Their number could not have survived from the Solar System's formation, and required replenishment from some other population. Some, such as Opik and Wetherill, hypothesized that most or all NEOs were actually extinct or dormant comets, requiring no ejection process from the main belt. The comets' orbits had become more circular after encounters with planets, possibly augmented by comet jetting. Centaurs, too, required some similar model.

A growing understanding of Solar System dynamics, including more observations, of more bodies, replicated by faster computer models, eliminated this requirement. Kirkwood gaps were evidence of loss from the main belt, via resonances with the planets. Later, the Yarkovsky effect, insignificant to a planet, could augment mechanisms.

Empirically, meteor cameras began tracing meteor trajectories, which led back to the asteroid belt. The Příbram (1959), Lost City (1970), and Innisfree (1977) meteorites had arrived via Apollo-like, belt-tangent orbits. Even afterward, some maintained that comets best explained carbonaceous chondrite meteorites or even ordinary chondrites.

=== As comets ===
The issue of asteroids versus comets reemerged with observations of active asteroids- that is, emission from small bodies in what were considered asteroidal orbits, not comet-like orbits (high eccentricity and inclination). This includes both Centaurs, past the snow line, and main belt objects, inside the line and previously assumed dry. Activity could, in some cases, be explained by ejecta, escaping from an impact. However, some asteroids showed activity at perihelion, then at subsequent perihelia. The probability of impacts with this timed pattern was considered unlikely versus a model of comet-like volatile emissions.

Observations of the Geminid meteor shower linked it to (3200) Phaeton, a body in a cometary orbit but with no visible coma or tail, and thus defined as an asteroid. Phaeton was a rock comet, whose emissions are largely discrete particles and not visible.

Observations of (1) Ceres emitting hydroxide (OH), the product of water after exposure to the Sun's ultraviolet levels, were further evidence. Ceres is well within the snow line, exposed to ultraviolet, and Cererean water was considered speculative, at least on its surface.

The IAU General Assembly of 2006 addressed this issue. Overshadowed by Pluto was the creation of small Solar System body (SSSB), a category needing no comet-asteroid distinction, nor establishment/disestablishment of volatile emission.

== Hydrology and morphology ==
Micro- and nanoscale water occurs as fluid inclusions in both carbonaceous and ordinary chondrites. However, as "bubble" diameters decrease, search costs increase geometrically. Their characterization is at the state of the art for most analytical techniques, and the method had seen slow progress to this point. Independently-confirmed fluid inclusions are, at minimum, Peetz and Jilin, with many other reports.

Minerals which appear waterless to the eye or hand may nevertheless be hydrated. Unfrozen water consists of molecular layers (one to possibly fifteen molecules thick) bound to, and kept from crystallizing by the equal or stronger attraction of the mineral of adsorption.

Water can persist at higher temperatures than normal in the form of hydrated minerals: those minerals which can bind water molecules at the crystalline level. Salts, including halite (table salt, NaCl) are ionic and attract individual, polar water molecules with electrostatic forces. Alternately, the parent mineral may be e. g., sulfate, and that mineral may retain hydroxide (OH). When freed from the crystal structure, hydroxide reverts to water and oxygen. These are considered water, in the usage of geochemistry and Solar System science.

Short of this binding, a surface may retain a monolayer or bilayer of water molecules or hydroxide. Phyllosilicate minerals assemble into microscopic plates, sheets, or fibers, rather than bulk crystals. The layers trap water between them; the large surface area created can hold much water. This is also considered water, in the geotechnical, geochemical, and astronomical usages.

On an even finer level, most rocks are silicates, or in some cases metal oxides, containing an oxygen fraction. Hydrogen content, as substitutions or interstitials, can react with oxygen (displacing its existing cation) to form hydroxide or water. The solar wind is a reducing environment, containing hydrogen atoms and protons (effectively hydrogen, in the form of hydrogen nuclei). Either may be implanted into exposed surfaces, as the small hydrogen atom is highly soluble. A lesser contribution may come from the proton component of cosmic rays. Both pyroxene and olivine, common asteroid minerals, can hydrate in this manner. This, too, is considered water within the geochemistry and geophysics fields.

Solar System science and asteroid mining ascribe hydrated minerals as containing water, in a similar sense as ice giant.

On a macroscopic scale, some thickness of crust may shelter water from evaporation, photolysis and radiolysis, meteoric bombardment, etc. Even where a crust does not originally exist, impurities in ice may form a crust after its parent ice escapes: a lag deposit.

On a geologic scale, the larger asteroids can shield water, phyllosilicate, ice, etc. contents in their interiors via a high thermal mass. Below some depth, the diurnal temperature variation becomes negligible, and the effect of solar insolation- a daytime temperature peak- does not boil out water. A low obliquity helps; while the tropics take solar insolation, two polar regions see little sunlight and can help maintain a low average temperature.

=== Water parent materials ===
==== Phyllosilicates ====
CI meteorites are mostly phyllosilicates. The phyllosilicates serpentinite, montmorillonite and saponite (clay), tochilinite, chamosite, cronstedtite, and mica have been identified in meteorites.

==== Sulfates and sulfides ====
Sulfur is found in meteorites; it has a fairly high cosmic abundance. The abundance in common (chondrite) meteorites is greater than that in Earth's crust; as a differentiated body, our crust has lost some sulfur to an iron core, and some to space as hydrogen sulfide gas. The element is present in all meteorites; carbonaceous chondrites and enstatite chondrites in particular have higher sulfur contents than the ordinary chondrites. In C1 and C2 chondrites, sulfur is found predominantly as free sulfur, sulfate minerals, and in organic compounds at a net 2–5 percent. A slight enrichment is due to cosmic-ray produced S36 and S33.

Sulfur-bearing, hydrated minerals identified via meteorites include epsomite, bloedite, gypsum/bassanite, and jarosite.

==== Carbonate ====
As the name implies, carbonaceous chondrites formed with chondrules and carbon. The carbonates whewellite/vaterite, hydromagnesite, calcite/dolomite, aragonite, and breunnerite have been found in meteorites.

=== By meteorite classification ===
Type	1	2	3	4	5	6
Overall Texture	No chondrites	Very sharply defined chondrites	Very sharply defined chondrites	Well-defined chondrites	Chondrites readily delineated	Poorly defined chondrites
Texture of matrix	All fine-grained, opaque	Much opaque matrix	Opaque matrix	Transparent, micro-crystalline matrix	Recrystallized matrix	Recrystallized matrix
Bulk carbon content	~2.8%	~0.6–2.8%	~0.2–1.0%	<0.2%	<0.2%	<0.2%
Bulk water content	~20%	~4-18%	<0.2%	<0.2%	<0.2%	<0.2%

-Petrological Scale (Van Schmus, Wood 1967). Since this time, a type seven has been added.

This taxonomy was preceded (Wiik 1956: Type I 20.08% water, Type II 13.35% water) and followed (Keil 1969, Mason 1971), with all in general agreement on these levels.

Meteorites are valuable ground truth. Studies, such as neutron activation analysis, can be performed without the mass and volume constraints of space flight. Meteorites also sample multiple depths of their parent bodies, not just dehydrated crusts or space-weathered rinds.

Yet meteorites are not sufficient. The body of meteoritics is dominated by durable examples, and deficient in classes and subclasses; one or more types may be missing entirely. Earth entry and exposure may then alter or remove some materials, while contaminating others. Such meteorites have speculative or unknown parent bodies, and no wider context of the sample versus the rest of that parent body.

==== Carbonaceous chondrites ====
Different carbonaceous chondrites show different signs of water, including extant water. Identifying parent bodies for CC meteorites is an ongoing subject, but they are generally held to be the low-albedo bodies: the C-complex (C-, B-, F-, G-, and D/P-types).

As darker bodies, generally farther out in the asteroid belt (or beyond) than the S-types, these are more difficult to study. Carbonaceous materials have flatter, less revealing spectra. CC parentage is also complicated by space weathering. C-complex bodies weather to different types and degrees than the silicate (S-type, and lunar) surfaces.

===== CI chondrites =====
The rare CI chondrites are so severely altered by water, they consist predominantly (~90%) of phyllosilicate matrix; chondrules are entirely dissolved, or very faint. All are type 1 (CI1), per the above scale. Berzelius first reported clay in the Orgueil meteorite, causing him to at first doubt it was extraterrestrial.

On a macroscopic scale, CI material is layered serpentinite/saponite. Microscopically, CI material appearance was first described as "spinach." These layers trap significant amounts of water; CI hydration is over 10%, at times ~20%.

As phyllosilicates are brittle, they are less likely to survive Earth entry and impact. Being water-soluble, they are unlikely to survive exposure, and there were no CI finds until the Antarctic meteorite era.

===== CM chondrites =====
CM meteorites loosely resemble CI, but altered to lesser extents. More chondrules appear, leaving less matrix. Accordingly, they are more mineralized and less hydrous. CMs are often, but not always, petrologic type 2. Cronstedtite tends to replace saponite, though as the most common CC subclass, properties range widely.

===== CR chondrites =====
CR meteorites loosely resemble CM, but appear to have formed in a reducing environment, not an oxidizing one. It is held that they formed in a similar manner but different zone of the Solar System than CMs. Water content is lower than in CM; still, serpentinites, chlorite, and carbonates appear. GRO 95577 and Al Rais meteorites are exceptional CRs.

===== CV chondrites =====
The CV chondrites show signs of prior water. However, surviving water is low.

==== Ordinary chondrites ====
Though clearly drier, ordinary chondrites nevertheless show trace phyllosilicates. The Semarkona meteorite is an exceptionally wet OC. Salts (halite and the related sylvite) carry brine inclusions; while the community first posited that the salts must be exogenous, the issue is ongoing. In parallel, OC minerals show evidence of water formations.

The parents of OCs are generally taken as the S-type asteroids.

===== R chondrites =====
R chondrites contain amphibole minerals, and lesser biotites and apatites. As with the other classes and subclasses, the R chondrites show clasts of foreign materials, including phyllosilicate (water-bearing serpentinite-saponite) inclusions. The LAP 04840 and MIL 11207 meteorites are particularly hydrous R chondrites.

==== Achondrite meteorites ====
===== HED meteorites =====
Like ordinary chondrites, the HEDs (howardites, eucrites, and diogenites) were assumed to have formations and histories that would prevent water contents. Actual measurements of clasts and elements indicate the HED parent body received carbonaceous chondrite materials, including their water.

The parent body of HEDs is a V-type asteroid, of which (4) Vesta is widely assumed.

===== Angrite meteorites =====
Like ordinary chondrites, the angrites were assumed to have formations and histories that would prevent water contents. Actual measurements of clasts and elements indicate the angrite parent body received carbonaceous chondrite materials, including their water.

===== Micrometeorites and dust particles =====
The smallest solid objects can have water. At Earth, falling particles returned by high-altitude planes and balloons show water contents. In the outer Solar System, atmospheres show water spectra where water should have been depleted. The atmospheres of giant planets and Titan are replenished by infall from an external source. Micrometeorites and interplanetary dust particles contain H_{2}O, some CO, and possibly CO_{2}.

It was assumed that monolithic minerals are asteroid debris, while dust particles, with a "fluffy", fractal-like aggregated structure, were assumed to be cometary. But these micro-impactors have asteroid-like isotopic ratios, not comet-like.

== Via remote sensing ==
=== Visible/near-infrared spectroscopy ===
The spectrum of water and water-bearing minerals have diagnostic features. Two such signs, in the near-infrared, extending somewhat into visible light, are in common use.

Water, hydroxyl, and some hydrated minerals have spectral features at wavelengths of 2.5–3.1 micrometers (um). Besides fundamental lines or bands is an overtone of a longer-wave (~6 um) feature. Wavelengths may shift in mineral combinations, or with temperature. The result is a wide absorption band in the light reflecting from such bodies.

Asteroid (162173) Ryugu, the target of the Hayabusa 2 mission, is expected to be hydrated where (25143) Itokawa was not. Hayabusa 1's NIRS (Near-Infrared Spectrometer) design was then shifted from its maximum wavelength of 2.1 um, to Hayabusa 2's NIRS3 (1.8-3.2 um), to cover this spectral range.

An absorption feature at ~0.7 micrometer is from the Fe2+ to Fe3+ transition, in iron-bearing phyllosilicates. The 0.7 um feature is not taken as sufficient. While many phyllosilicates contain iron, other hydrated minerals do not, including non-phyllosilicates. In parallel, some non-hydrated minerals have absorption features at 0.7 um. The advantage of such observing is that 0.7 um is in the sensitivity range of common silicon detectors, where 3 um requires more exotic sensors.

=== Other spectral ranges ===
Lesser signs of water include ultraviolet/visible (OH 0-0, 308 Å), mid-infrared, and longer.

=== Neutron spectroscopy ===
The hydrogen nucleus—one proton—is essentially the mass of one neutron. Neutrons striking hydrogen then rebound with a characteristic speed. Such thermal neutrons indicate hydrogen versus other elements, and hydrogen often indicates water. Neutron fluxes are low, so detection from Earth is infeasible. Even flyby missions are poor; orbiters and landers are needed for significant integration times.

=== Direct imaging ===
Most small bodies are dots or single pixels in most telescopes. If such a body appears as an extended object, a coma of gas and dust is suspected, especially if it shows radial falloff, a tail, temporal variation, etc. Though other volatiles exist, water is often assumed to be present.

Native ice is difficult to image. Ice, particularly as small grains, is translucent, and tends to be masked by a parent material, or even sufficient levels of some impurities.

=== Sample science ===
A sample in hand can be checked for fluid inclusions ("bubbles") versus remote sensing, or even contact science; most volatiles are lost at a depth greater than the skin depth. Near- and mid-IR spectroscopy are also easier at benchtop range. Other measurements of water include nuclear magnetic resonance (NMR), nanoSIMS; energy dispersive X-ray spectroscopy (EDS), and eventually thermogravimetric analysis (TGA)–driving off any water content.

=== Examples ===
==== (2060) Chiron ====
The Centaur 2060 Chiron, in a generally circular orbit, was assumed to be asteroidal, and given an asteroid number. However, at its first perihelion since its discovery and presumably warmer, it formed a coma, indicating loss of volatiles like a comet.

==== Mercury polar deposits ====
Asteroidal impacts have sufficient water to form Mercury's polar ices, without invoking comets. Any cometary water (including dormant, transitional objects) would be additional. Not only are asteroids sufficient, but micrometeoroids/dust particles have the required water content; conversely, many of the asteroids in Mercury-crossing orbits may actually be defunct comets.

==== Earth/Moon system ====
Claimed water at the lunar poles was, at first, attributed to comet impacts over the eons. This was an easy explanation. Subsequent analyses, including analyses of Earth-Moon isotopes versus comet isotopes, showed that comet water does not match Earth-Moon isotopes, while meteoritic water is very close. The cometary water contribution may be as little as zero. At Earth's Moon, comet impact velocities are too high for volatile materials to remain, while asteroid orbits are shallow enough to deposit their water. Traces of carbonaceous chondrites- and thus, water- are observable in lunar samples. Only a small portion (if any) of comets contributed to the volatile content of the inner Solar System bodies.

==== (24) Themis ====
Water on Themis, an outer-belt object, was directly observed. It is hypothesized that a recent impact exposed an ice deposit. Other members of the Themis family, likely fragments of Themis itself or a larger parent now lost, also show signs of water.

Active asteroids Elst–Pizarro, 118401 LINEAR, and possibly 238P/Read are family members.

==== (65) Cybele ====
As with Themis, Cybele is an outer-belt, C-type or C-complex object at which a spectra of volatiles has been observed.

==== (4) Vesta ====
Vesta was thought to be dry; it is in an inner, warmer zone of the asteroid belt, and its minerals (identified by spectroscopy) had volcanic origins which were assumed to have driven off water. For the Dawn mission, it would serve as a counterexample to hydrated (1) Ceres. However, at Vesta, Dawn found significant water. Reddy estimates the total Vestan water at 30 to 50 times that of Earth's Moon. Scully et al. also claim that slumping on Vesta indicates the action of volatiles.

==== (1) Ceres ====
The Herschel telescope observed far-infrared emission spectra from Ceres indicating water loss. Though debatable at the time, the subsequent Dawn probe would use a different method (thermal neutrons) to detect subsurface hydrogen (in water or ammonium) at high Cererean latitudes, and a third method (near-infrared spectra) for likely local emissions. A fourth line of evidence, relaxation of large craters, suggests a mechanically weak subsurface such as frozen volatiles.

The feature Ahuna Mons is most likely cryovolcanic: a Cererean pingo.

==== (16)Psyche ====
Psyche, despite being an M-type asteroid, shows the spectral signs of hydrated minerals.

==== (25143) Itokawa ====
Water has been found in samples retrieved by the Hayabusa 1 mission. Despite being an S-type near-Earth asteroid, assumed dry, Itokawa is hypothesized to have been "a water-rich asteroid" before its disruption event. This remaining hydration is likely asteroidal, not terrestrial contamination. The water shows isotopic levels similar to carbonaceous chondrite water, and the sample canister was sealed with double O-rings.

==== (101955) Bennu ====
Maltagliati proposed that Bennu has significant volatiles content, similar to Ceres. This was confirmed in the mechanical sense, with activity observed in separate events, not associated with impacts.

The OSIRIS-REx spacecraft, on arriving at Bennu, found its surface to be mostly phyllosilicates that hold water.

==== (162173) Ryugu ====
Ryugu, the target of the Hayabusa2 mission, showed activity which may be an impact, escape of volatiles, or both.

Hayabusa2, after an initial calibration adjustment, confirmed "The decision to choose Ryugu as the destination, based on the prediction that there is some water, was not wrong" (-Kohei Kitazato).

== Indirect candidates ==
=== Jupiter trojans ===
The snow line of this system is inside of Jupiter, making the Jupiter Trojans likely candidates for high water contents. Yet few signs of water have been found in spectroscopes. The hypothesis is that, past the snow line on a small body, such water is bound as ice. Ice is unlikely to participate in reactions to form hydrated minerals, or to escape as water/OH, both of which are spectrally distinct where solid ice is not.

The exception is 617 Patroclus; it may also have formed farther out, then been captured by Jupiter.

=== 2 Pallas ===
Broadly similar to Ceres, 2 Pallas is a very large SSSB in the cooler, middle main belt. While the exact typing of Pallas is somewhat arbitrary, it, like Ceres, is not S-, M-, or V-type. The C-complex bodies are considered more likely to contain significant water.

=== Dormant comets ===
The category of Damocloids is defined as high-inclination, high-eccentricity bodies with no visible activity. In other words, they appear asteroid-like, but travel in cometary orbits.

107P/Wilson–Harrington is the first unambiguous ex-comet. After its 1949 discovery, Wilson–Harrington was not observed again in what should have been perihelion passages. In 1979, an asteroid was found and given the provisional designation 1979 VA, until its orbit could be determined to a sufficient level. That orbit matched that of comet Wilson–Harrington; the body is now dual-designated as (4015) Wilson–Harrington, too.

Other candidates include 944 Hidalgo, 1983 SA, (2101) Adonis, (2201) Oljato, (3552) Don Quijote

Weak comets, perhaps not to the stage of Wilson–Harrington, include Arend–Rigauz and Neujmin 1.

(4660) Nereus, the original target of the Hayabusa mission, was selected both for its very accessible orbit, and the possibility that it is an extinct or dormant comet.

=== 331P/Gibbs ===
Active asteroid 331P/Gibbs also has a small, close, and dynamically stable family (cluster) of other objects.

=== (6478) Gault ===
Asteroid (6478) Gault showed activity in late October/early November 2018; however, this alone could be impact ejecta. Activity subsided in December, but resumed in January 2019, making it unlikely to be solely one impact.

== As a resource ==
=== Propellant ===
The Tsiolkovskiy equation governs rocket travel. Given the velocities involved with space flight, the equation dictates that mission mass is dominated by propellant requirements, increasing as missions progress beyond low-Earth orbit.

Asteroidal water can be used as a resistojet propellant. The application of large amounts of electricity (electrolysis) may decompose water into hydrogen and oxygen, which can be used in chemical rockets. When combined with the carbon present in carbonaceous chondrites (more likely to have high water content), these can synthesize oxygen and methane (both storable in space with a passive thermal design, unlike hydrogen), oxygen and methanol, etc. As an in-space resource, asteroidal mass does not need to be lifted out of a gravity well. The cost of propellant then, in terms of other propellant, is lower by a multiplier set by the Tsiolkovskiy equation.

Multiple organizations have and intend to use water propellants.

=== Radiation shielding ===
Water, as a reasonably dense material, can be used as a radiation shield. In microgravity, bags of water or water-filled spaces need little structural support. Another benefit is that water, having elements with moderate and low Z, generates little secondary radiation when struck. It can be used to block the secondary radiation from higher-Z materials, forming a graded-Z shield. This other material may be the spoil or gangue/tailings from asteroid processing.

=== Growth medium ===
Carbonaceous chondrites contain water, carbon, and minerals necessary for plant growth.

== See also ==
- Asteroid mining – Exploitation of raw materials from asteroids
- Extraterrestrial water – Liquid water naturally occurring outside Earth
- In-situ resource utilization – Astronautical use of materials harvested in outer space
- Origin of water on Earth – Hypotheses for the possible sources of the water on Earth
- Propellant depot – Cache of propellant used to refuel spacecraft
- Water in Earth's mantle
- Water on terrestrial planets of the Solar System

== Bibliography ==
- Kerridge J, Bunch T (1979). "Aqueous Activity on Asteroids: Evidence from Carbonaceous Meteorites in Asteroids.". In Gehrels T, Mathews M (eds.). Asteroids. University of Arizona Press. ISBN 978-0-8165-0695-8.
- Roedder E, ed. (1984). Fluid Inclusions. Mineralogical Society of America. ISBN 0-939950-16-2.
- Zolensky M, McSween H (1988). "Aqueous Alteration". In Kerridge J, Matthews M (eds.). Meteorites and the early solar system. University of Arizona Press. p. 114. OCLC 225496581.
- Lewis J, Hutson M (1993). "Asteroidal Resource Opportunities Suggested by Meteorite Data". In Lewis J, Matthews M, Guerrieri M (eds.). Resources of Near-Earth Space. University of Arizona Press. p. 523. ISBN 978-0-8165-1404-5.
- Nichols C (1993). "Volatile Products from Carbonaceous Asteroids". In Lewis J, Matthews M, Guerrieri M (eds.). Resources of Near-Earth Space. University of Arizona Press. p. 543. ISBN 978-0-8165-1404-5.
- Lodders K, Osborne R (1999). "Perspectives on the Comet-Asteroid-Meteorite Link". In Altwegg K, Ehrenfreund P, Geiss J, Huebner WF, Geiss J (eds.). Composition and Origin of Cometary Materials. Dordrecht: Springer. pp. 289–297. ISBN 978-0-7923-6154-1.
- Jewitt D, Chizmadia L, Grimm R, Prialnik D (2002). "Water in the Small Bodies of the Solar System". In Bottke WF, Cellino A, Paolicchi P, Binzel RP (eds.). Asteroids III. University of Arizona Press. p. 863. ISBN 978-0-8165-2281-1.
- Keppler H, Smyth JR (2006). Keppler H, Smyth J (eds.). Water in Nominally Anhydrous Minerals. ISBN 978-0-939950-74-4.
- Rivkin AS, Campins H, Emery J, Howell E (2015). "Astronomical Observations of Volatiles on Asteroids". In Michel P, DeMeo FE, Bottke WP (eds.). Asteroids IV. University of Arizona Press. pp. 65–88. ISBN 978-0-8165-3218-6.
- Binzel R, Reddy V, Dunn T (2015). "The Active Asteroids". In Michel P, DeMeo FE, Bottke WP (eds.). Asteroids IV. University of Arizona Press. p. 221. ISBN 978-0-8165-3218-6.
- Wilson L, Bland PA, Buczkowski D, Keil K, Krot AN (2015). "Hydrothermal and Magmatic Fluid Flow in Asteroids". In Michel P, DeMeo FE, Bottke WP (eds.). Asteroids IV. University of Arizona Press. p. 553. ISBN 978-0-8165-3218-6.
- Krot AN, Nagashima K, Alexander CM, Ciesla FJ, Fujiya W, Bonal L (2015). "Sources of Water and Aqueous Activity on the Chondrite Parent Asteroids". In Michel P, DeMeo FE, Bottke WP (eds.). Asteroids IV. University of Arizona Press. p. 635. ISBN 978-0-8165-3218-6.
- Snodgrass C, Agarwal J, Combi M, Fitzsimmons A, Guilbert-Lepoutre A, Hsieh HH, et al. (November 2017). "The main belt comets and ice in the solar system". The Astronomy and Astrophysics Review. 25 (1) 5. arXiv:1709.05549. Bibcode:2017A&ARv..25....5S. doi:10.1007/s00159-017-0104-7. S2CID 7683815.
