= 60558 Echeclus =

Centaur comet with 34 year orbit

60558 Echeclus 174P/Echeclus
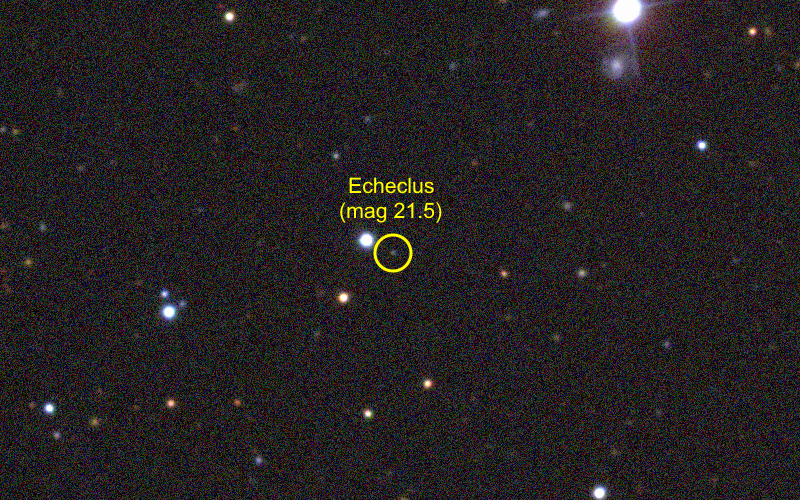
- Echeclus (circled) photographed by the Sloan Digital Sky Survey at Apache Point Observatory on 16 April 2001

Discovery
- Discovered by: Spacewatch
- Discovery site: Kitt Peak Obs.
- Discovery date: 3 March 2000

Designations
- Pronunciation: /ˈɛkəkləs/
- Named after: Ἔχεκλος Ekheklos
- Alternative designations: 2000 EC_{98}, 2002 GJ_{27}
- Minor planet category: centaur
- Symbol: (astrological)

Orbital characteristics
- Epoch 13 January 2016 (JD 2457400.5)
- Uncertainty parameter 0
- Observation arc: 13264 days (36.31 yr)
- Aphelion: 15.544 AU (2.3253 Tm)
- Perihelion: 5.8168 AU (870.18 Gm)
- Semi-major axis: 10.680 AU (1.5977 Tm)
- Eccentricity: 0.45537
- Orbital period (sidereal): 34.90 yr (12749 d)
- Average orbital speed: 8.58 km/s
- Mean anomaly: 7.51102°
- Mean motion: 0° 1^{m} 41.657^{s} / day
- Inclination: 4.3445°
- Longitude of ascending node: 173.335°
- Time of perihelion: 2050-May-19; 2015-Apr-22 (previous)
- Argument of perihelion: 162.889°
- Jupiter MOID: 0.838867 AU (125.4927 Gm)
- T_{Jupiter}: 3.031

Proper orbital elements
- Proper mean motion: 0.0282 deg / yr
- Proper orbital period: 12765.95745 yr (4662765.957 d)

Physical characteristics
- Mean diameter: 60 km
- Synodic rotation period: 26.802 h (1.1168 d)
- Geometric albedo: 0.04
- Temperature: ~85 K
- Spectral type: B–V = 0.841±0.072; V–R = 0.502±0.065
- Apparent magnitude: ~18.8
- Absolute magnitude (H): 9.6

60558 Echeclus is a centaur, approximately 60 kilometers (37 miles) in diameter, located in the outer Solar System. It was discovered by Spacewatch in 2000 and initially classified as a minor planet with provisional designation 2000 EC_{98}. Research in 2001 by Rousselot and Petit at the Besançon observatory in France indicated that it was not a comet, but in December 2005 a cometary coma was detected. In early 2006 the Committee on Small Bodies Nomenclature (CSBN) gave it the cometary designation 174P/Echeclus. It last came to perihelion in April 2015, and was expected to reach about apparent magnitude 16.7 near opposition in September 2015.

== Name ==
Echeclus is a centaur in Greek mythology.

Echeclus is only the second comet (after Chiron) that was named as a minor planet, rather than after the name of its discoverer. Chiron is also a centaur; other centaurs are being observed for signs of a cometary coma.

Besides Echeclus, eight other objects are cross-listed as both comets and numbered minor planets: 2060 Chiron (95P/Chiron), 4015 Wilson–Harrington (107P/Wilson–Harrington), 7968 Elst–Pizarro (133P/Elst–Pizarro), 118401 LINEAR (176P/LINEAR), (323137) 2003 BM80 (282P/2003 BM_{80}), (300163) 2006 VW139 (288P/2006 VW_{139}), (457175) 2008 GO98 (362P/2008 GO_{98}), and (248370) 2005 QN173 (433P/2005 QN_{173}).

== Activity ==
=== Fragmentation ===
On 30 December 2005, when 13.1 AU from the Sun, a large chunk of Echeclus was observed to break off, causing a great cloud of dust. Astronomers have speculated this could have been caused by an impact or by an explosive release of volatile substances.

=== Outbursts ===
Echeclus appears to have outburst again around June 2011 when it was 8.5 AU from the Sun. On 24 June 2011, follow up imaging with the 2 meter Haleakala-Faulkes Telescope South showed the coma of Echeclus to be very close to the sky background limit.

Echeclus outburst again around 7 December 2017 when it was 7.3 AU from the Sun, and was 4 magnitudes brighter than expected.

=== Presence of gas ===
In 2016, carbon monoxide was detected in Echeclus in very small amounts, and the derived CO production rate was calculated to be sufficient to account for the observed coma. The calculated CO production rate from Echeclus is substantially lower than what is typically observed for 29P/Schwassmann–Wachmann, another distantly active comet often classified as a centaur.

== Orbit ==
Echeclus came to perihelion in April 2015.

Centaurs have short dynamical lives due to strong interactions with the giant planets. Echeclus is estimated to have an orbital half-life of about 610,000 years.

== Physical characteristics ==
=== Size and color ===
Comparison of sizes, albedos, and colors of various large centaurs with measured diameters. Echeclus is shown in the bottom row, third from right.

Echeclus measures approximately 60 kilometers in diameter.

== See also ==
- List of centaurs (small Solar System bodies) § 60558

Numbered comets
Previous; 173P/Mueller	174P/Echeclus	Next; 175P/Hergenrother
