= Comet Gibbs =

Comet Gibbs may refer to any of the following comets discovered by American astronomer, Alex R. Gibbs, below:

== Periodic comets ==
=== Encke-type comets ===
- 313P/Gibbs
- 331P/Gibbs

=== Jupiter-family comets ===
- 229P/Gibbs
- 248P/Gibbs
- 263P/Gibbs
- 335P/Gibbs
- 339P/Gibbs
- 341P/Gibbs
- 388P/Gibbs
- 390P/Gibbs
- 406P/Gibbs
- 428P/Gibbs
- P/2007 K2 (Gibbs)
- P/2011 C2 (Gibbs)
- P/2012 K3 (Gibbs)
- P/2016 R4 (Gibbs)
- P/2017 W3 (Gibbs)
- P/2023 Y1 (Gibbs)
- P/2023 Y2 (Gibbs)

=== Halley-type comets ===
- C/2006 U7 (Gibbs)
- C/2018 A6 (Gibbs)

=== Chiron-type comets ===
- P/2011 S1 (Gibbs)

== Non-periodic comets ==
- C/2007 T5 (Gibbs)
- C/2008 G1 (Gibbs)
- C/2009 K4 (Gibbs)
- C/2011 A3 (Gibbs)
- C/2011 C3 (Gibbs)
- C/2012 F1 (Gibbs)
- C/2014 R4 (Gibbs)

== Hyperbolic comets ==
- C/2007 K4 (Gibbs)
- C/2010 M1 (Gibbs)
- C/2015 W1 (Gibbs)
