= 4015 Wilson–Harrington =

Periodic comet with 4 year orbit

4015 Wilson–Harrington 107P/Wilson–Harrington
- 4015 Wilson–Harrington at 19 November 1949, from the 48-inch Schmidt telescope at Palomar. The image was enhanced by ESO to show the tail.

Discovery
- Discovered by: Albert G. Wilson and Robert G. Harrington
- Discovery date: 19 November 1949

Designations
- Alternative designations: 107P/1949 W1; 107P/1979 VA; 1949 III · 1949g
- Minor planet category: NEO · Apollo · Comet

Orbital characteristics
- Epoch 2022-Aug-09 (JD 2459800.5)
- Uncertainty parameter 0
- Observation arc: 24241 days (66.37 yr)
- Aphelion: 4.2833 AU (640.77 Gm)
- Perihelion: 0.96664 AU (144.607 Gm)
- Semi-major axis: 2.6249 AU (392.68 Gm)
- Eccentricity: 0.63175
- Orbital period (sidereal): 4.25 yr (1553.4 d)
- Average orbital speed: 16.39 km/s
- Mean anomaly: 356.37°
- Mean motion: 0° 13^{m} 47.568^{s} / day
- Inclination: 2.7992°
- Longitude of ascending node: 266.77°
- Time of perihelion: 2026-Nov-25; 2022-Aug-24 (previous)
- Argument of perihelion: 95.441°
- Earth MOID: 0.045552 AU (6.8145 Gm)
- T_{Jupiter}: 3.080

Physical characteristics
- Dimensions: 4 km
- Mean radius: 2 ± 0.25 km
- Synodic rotation period: 3.5736 h (0.14890 d)
- Geometric albedo: 0.05 ± 0.01
- Spectral type: (orange); B−V=0.666; U−B=0.279
- Apparent magnitude: ~11 (1979); 16 (2009)
- Absolute magnitude (H): 15.99

4015 Wilson–Harrington is an active asteroid known both as comet 107P/Wilson–Harrington and as asteroid 4015 Wilson–Harrington. It passed 0.4 AU (60 million km) from Earth on 20 July 2022 and then passed perihelion (closest approach to the Sun) on 24 August 2022. It seldom gets brighter than apparent magnitude 16. It will return to perihelion on 25 November 2026.

== Observational history ==
This near-Earth object is classified as both an Apollo asteroid with the designation 4015 Wilson–Harrington and as a periodic comet known as Comet Wilson–Harrington or 107P/Wilson–Harrington. It was initially discovered in 1949 as a comet and then lost to further observations. Thirty years later it was rediscovered as an asteroid, after which it took over a decade to determine that these observations were of the same object. Therefore, it has both a comet designation and an asteroid designation, and with a name length of 17 characters it is currently the asteroid with the longest name, having one more character than the 16-character limit imposed by the IAU.

The comet was discovered on 19 November 1949, by Albert G. Wilson and Robert G. Harrington at Palomar Observatory. Only three photographic observations were obtained and the comet was lost (insufficient observations to determine a precise enough orbit to know where to look for future appearances of the comet).

On 15 November 1979, an apparent Mars-crosser asteroid was found by Eleanor F. Helin, also of Palomar Observatory. It received the designation 1979 VA, and when re-observed on 20 December 1988, received the permanent number 4015.

On 13 August 1992, it was reported that asteroid (4015) 1979 VA and comet 107P/Wilson–Harrington were the same object. By then, enough observations of the asteroid had accumulated to obtain a fairly precise orbit, and the search of old photographic plates for prediscovery images turned up the 1949 plates with the images of the lost comet.

Although the 1949 images show cometary features, all subsequent images appear stellar, suggesting it might be an inactive comet that undergoes only infrequent outbursts.

== Orbital and physical properties ==
The eccentricity is 0.624, which is somewhat higher than that of a typical asteroid-belt minor planet and more typical of periodic comets. Its Minimum Orbit Intersection Distance (MOID) of less than 0.05 AU and its large size make it a potentially hazardous asteroid (PHA).

There are only eight other objects that are cross-listed as both comets and asteroids: 2060 Chiron (95P/Chiron), 7968 Elst–Pizarro (133P/Elst–Pizarro), 60558 Echeclus (174P/Echeclus), 118401 LINEAR (176P/LINEAR), (323137) 2003 BM80 (282P/2003 BM_{80}), (300163) 2006 VW139 (288P/2006 VW_{139}), (457175) 2008 GO98 (362P/2008 GO_{98}), and (248370) 2005 QN173 (433P/2005 QN_{173}). As a dual status object, astrometric observations of 4015 Wilson–Harrington should be reported under the minor planet designation.

== Exploration ==
A flyby of 4015 Wilson–Harrington was formerly planned by Deep Space 1. It was also considered for the NEAR mission.

== See also ==
- Marco Polo (spacecraft)
- List of asteroids visited by spacecraft

Numbered comets
Previous; 106P/Schuster	4015 Wilson–Harrington	Next; 108P/Ciffreo
