= 313P/Gibbs =

Active asteroid

Discovery
- Discovered by: Alex R. Gibbs
- Discovery site: Catalina Sky Survey
- Discovery date: 24 September 2014

Designations
- MPC designation: P/2003 S10; P/2014 S4
- Alternative designations: Gibbs 16

Orbital characteristics
- Epoch: 21 November 2025 (JD 2461000.5)
- Observation arc: 22 years
- Earliest precovery date: 22 September 2003
- Number of observations: 204
- Aphelion: 3.904 AU
- Perihelion: 2.422 AU
- Semi-major axis: 3.163 AU
- Eccentricity: 0.23431
- Orbital period: 5.624 years
- Inclination: 10.981°
- Longitude of ascending node: 105.92°
- Argument of periapsis: 254.99°
- Mean anomaly: 357.93°
- Last perihelion: 2 December 2025
- Next perihelion: 2031
- T_{Jupiter}: 3.132
- Earth MOID: 1.429 AU
- Jupiter MOID: 1.678 AU

Physical characteristics
- Mean radius: 0.85 km (0.53 mi)
- Synodic rotation period: 4 hours
- Geometric albedo: 0.05 (assumed)
- Comet total magnitude (M1): 17.1±0.03

313P/Gibbs (P/2014 S4) is an Encke-type comet and active asteroid, discovered by American astronomer Alex Gibbs. It is the third main-belt comet after 133P/Elst–Pizzaro and 238P/Read observed to show mass loss in different orbits.

== Observational history ==
Alex R. Gibbs reported the discovery of this comet as a nearly stellar object with a narrow tail from CCD images taken by the Catalina Sky Survey in 24 September 2014. Shuichi Nakano later identified precovery images of the comet taken as early as September 2003 from the LONEOS and SDSS surveys. It was recovered ahead of its 2020 apparition in August 2019, exhibiting significant non-perihelion activity compared to 2014. The comet was given an official numerical designation in 2017.

== Orbit ==
313P/Gibbs currently orbits at a distance between 2.42–3.9 AU (362–583 million km) from the Sun, within the outer portion of the main asteroid belt. Computations of its orbit reveal that 313P is intrinsically chaotic, with a Lyapunov time of only 12000 years and being located near two three-body mean-motion resonances with Jupiter and Saturn, yet appears stable over 50 million years. Astrometric data analysis shows that 313P is experiencing some transverse non-gravitational acceleration caused by recoil forces due to anisotropic mass loss. It is a member of the Lixiaohua asteroid family, a group of more than 700 asteroids estimated to be around 155 million years old.

== Physical characteristics ==
=== Nucleus size ===
Archival imagery from the Subaru Telescope taken in 2004 indicated an upper-limit size of the comet's nucleus to be around 1.00±0.15 km in radius, assuming a geometric albedo of 0.05. Data obtained from the Hubble Space Telescope resulted in a lower-limit of around 0.5–0.7 km in radius. Further observations from the Gemini Observatory in 2017 revised the size estimate to be around 0.85 km (0.53 mi) in radius.

=== Cometary activity ===
From its three known appearances since 2003, 313P/Gibbs has consistently shown signs of activity, suggesting that it is likely to be generated from the sublimation of volatile material (ice) from its nucleus. In both the 2003 and 2014 apparitions, dust emissions lasted for at least 3–4 months. Impact driven activity was ruled out, as the mass-loss rate is consistent at 0.2–0.4 kg/s (0.44–0.88 lb/s). The persistent sublimation activity on 313P, along with other active asteroids (133P/Elst–Pizzaro, 238P/Read, and 358P/PanSTARRS), suggests an abundance of ice within the outer asteroid belt. Its water-ice sublimation is non-uniform around perihelion, which is likely related to the seasonal modulation driven by the orientation of its rotational axis.

Numbered comets
Previous; 312P/NEAT	313P/Gibbs	Next; 314P/Montani
