= Altwegg =

Altwegg is a Swiss surname. Notable people with the surname include:

- Jeannette Altwegg (1930–2021), British figure skater
- Kathrin Altwegg (born 1951), Swiss astrophysicist
- Timon Altwegg (born 1967), Swiss classical pianist
