= 118401 LINEAR =

Asteroid and main-belt comet

118401 LINEAR 176P/LINEAR
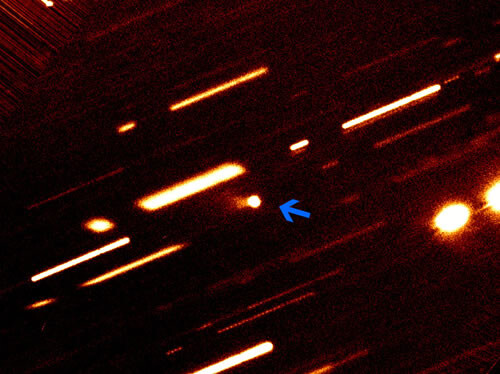

Discovery
- Discovered by: LINEAR
- Discovery date: 7 September 1999

Designations
- Named after: LINEAR
- Alternative designations: 176P/LINEAR · 1999 RE_{70}
- Minor planet category: main-belt · Themis; MBC

Orbital characteristics
- Epoch 13 January 2016 (JD 2457400.5); T_jup = 3.166
- Uncertainty parameter 0
- Observation arc: 5808 days (15.90 yr)
- Aphelion: 3.8110 AU (570.12 Gm)
- Perihelion: 2.5793 AU (385.86 Gm)
- Semi-major axis: 3.1951 AU (477.98 Gm)
- Eccentricity: 0.19276
- Orbital period (sidereal): 5.71 yr (2086.1 d)
- Average orbital speed: 16.51 km/s
- Mean anomaly: 286.74°
- Mean motion: 0.17257°/day
- Inclination: 0.23477°
- Longitude of ascending node: 345.96°
- Argument of perihelion: 35.460°
- Earth MOID: 1.58057 AU (236.450 Gm)
- Jupiter MOID: 1.6475 AU (246.46 Gm)

Physical characteristics
- Dimensions: 4.0±0.4 km (Spitzer)
- Mass: 4.3×10^{13}? kg
- Mean density: 1.3? g/cm^{3} (assumed)
- Equatorial surface gravity: <0.0017 m/s^{2}
- Equatorial escape velocity: <0.0032 km/s
- Synodic rotation period: ? d
- Geometric albedo: 0.06±0.02_{R}
- Temperature: ~156 K
- Spectral type: ?
- Apparent magnitude: 18.19 to 21.91
- Absolute magnitude (H): 15.1

176P/LINEAR
Discovery
- Discovered by: LINEAR
- Discovery date: October 18, 2005

Designations
- Alternative designations: P/1999 RE_{70}

Orbital characteristics
- Epoch: November 6, 2005 (JD 2453680.5)
- Aphelion: 3.811678 AU
- Perihelion: 2.5811186 AU
- Semi-major axis: 3.19640 AU
- Eccentricity: 0.1924908
- Orbital period: 5.714 a
- Inclination: 0.23795°
- Last perihelion: November 21, 2022; 2017 March 12; June 30, 2011; October 18, 2005
- Next perihelion: 2028-Aug-05

118401 LINEAR (provisional designation 1999 RE_{70}, comet designation 176P/LINEAR) is an active asteroid and main-belt comet that was discovered by the Lincoln Near-Earth Asteroid Research (LINEAR) 1-metre telescopes in Socorro, New Mexico on September 7, 1999. (118401) LINEAR was discovered to be cometary on November 26, 2005, by Henry H. Hsieh and David C. Jewitt as part of the Hawaii Trails project using the Gemini North 8-m telescope on Mauna Kea and was confirmed by the University of Hawaii's 2.2-m (88-in) telescope on December 24–27, 2005, and Gemini on December 29, 2005. Observations using the Spitzer Space Telescope have resulted in an estimate of 4.0±0.4 km for the diameter of (118401) LINEAR.

The main-belt comets are unique in that they have flat (within the plane of the planets' orbits), approximately circular (small eccentricity), asteroid-like orbits, and not the elongated, often tilted orbits characteristic of all other comets. Because (118401) LINEAR can generate a coma (produced by vapour boiled off the comet), it must be an icy asteroid. When a typical comet approaches the Sun, its ice heats up and sublimates (changes directly from ice to gas), venting gas and dust into space, creating a tail and giving the object a fuzzy appearance. Far from the Sun, sublimation stops, and the remaining ice stays frozen until the comet's next pass close to the Sun. In contrast, objects in the asteroid belt have essentially circular orbits and are expected to be mostly baked dry of ice by their confinement to the inner Solar System (see extinct comet).

It is suggested that these main-belt asteroid-comets are evidence of a recent impact exposing an icy interior to solar radiation. It is estimated short-period comets remain active for about 10,000 years before having most of their ice sublimated away and going dormant.

Eight other objects are classified as both periodic comets and numbered asteroids: 2060 Chiron (95P/Chiron), 4015 Wilson–Harrington (107P/Wilson–Harrington), 7968 Elst–Pizarro (133P/Elst–Pizarro), 60558 Echeclus (174P/Echeclus), (323137) 2003 BM80 (282P/2003 BM_{80}), (300163) 2006 VW139 (288P/2006 VW_{139}), (457175) 2008 GO98 (362P/2008 GO_{98}), and (248370) 2005 QN173 (433P/2005 QN_{173}). As a dual-status object, astrometric observations of 118401 LINEAR should be reported under the minor planet designation.

118401 LINEAR last came to perihelion on November 21, 2022.

Numbered comets
Previous; 175P/Hergenrother	176P/LINEAR	Next; 177P/Barnard
