= Castalia (spacecraft) =

Proposed comet/asteroid exploration spacecraft

- Mission type: Reconnaissance
- Operator: European Space Agency
- Website: sites.google.com/site/castaliathemission/
- Mission duration: 1 year

Spacecraft properties
- Launch mass: 1,611 kg (3,552 lb)
- Dry mass: 1,387 kg

Start of mission
- Launch date: Proposed: October 2028
- Rocket: Proposed: Ariane 6.2

Comet 7968 Elst–Pizarro orbiter
- Orbital insertion: 2035

Castalia is a proposed mission concept for a robotic spacecraft to explore the main-belt comet 7968 Elst–Pizarro and make the first in situ measurements of water in the asteroid belt, and thus, help solve the mystery of the origin of Earth's water. The lead is Colin Snodgrass, from The Open University in UK.

Castalia was proposed in 2015 and 2016 to the European Space Agency within the Cosmic Vision programme missions M4 and M5, but it was not selected. Because of the construction time required and orbital dynamics, a launch date of October 2028 is proposed.

== Overview ==
Main-belt comets (MBCs) are a recently discovered population of apparently icy bodies within the main asteroid belt between Mars and Jupiter, which may represent the remnants of the population which supplied the early Earth with water. The Rosetta mission to comet 67P/Churyumov–Gerasimenko in 2014, indicates that Jupiter family comets cannot be the main source of Earth's water as previously thought. Castalia would rendezvous and orbit comet 7968 Elst–Pizarro and measure isotope ratios, plasma and dust properties, while also mapping its interior structure with a radar. Basically, Castalia would test whether MBCs are a viable source for Earth's water, and to use MBCs as tracers of the formation and evolution of the Solar System.

The primary propulsion would be solar electric with supporting chemical propulsion. The spacecraft would orbit comet Pizarro from a distance of 20 km, and it would also perform a few close approaches and 'hover' for a total of 100 hours as close as 5 km from the surface to make additional observations and collect the necessary sampling of dust and gas.

The mission architecture and spacecraft design were initially developed in 2013 by the German Aerospace Center (DLR) in Bremen and OHB SE. Castalia was proposed, in slightly different versions, to the European Space Agency M4 (2015), and M5 (2016) missions within the Cosmic Vision programme. Although it was not selected, the team continues to mature the mission concept and science goals.

The mission concept is named after Castalia, a nymph in Greek mythology that was turned into a fountain by a god, and she could inspire the genius of poetry to those who drank her waters or listened to their quiet sound.

=== Science goals ===
The main science goals of the mission are:

- Characterise a main belt comet (MBC), by in situ investigation
- Understand the physics of MBC activity
- Directly detect water in the asteroid belt
- Test whether MBCs are a viable source for Earth's water
- Use MBCs as tracers of planetary system formation and evolution.

== Science payload ==
The conceptual science payload includes the following instruments:

- MBCCAM, vis/near-IR imager
- TMC, thermal IR imager
- SOURCE, deep radar
- SSR, shallow radar
- CAMS, mass spectrometer
- DIDIMA, combined dust detector and composition
- MAG, magnetometer
- ChAPS, plasma package

The mission would also include a radio science experiment using the spacecraft's communication system.

== See also ==
- List of missions to comets
- 4769 Castalia (1st NEO to be radar-imaged)
- Deep Impact (spacecraft) (incl. comet impactor)
- Rosetta (spacecraft) (incl. comet lander)
- Deep Impact (spacecraft) (incl. comet impactor)
- Tianwen-2, a Chinese mission that also plans to visit Elst–Pizarro
