= 2010 LH15 =

Active asteroid

(2010 LH_{15})
Discovery
- Discovered by: WISE; Catalina Sky Survey
- Discovery date: 3–9 June 2010; 28 October 2010

Designations
- Alternative designations: 2010 TJ_{175}
- Minor planet category: Active asteroid Outer main-belt

Orbital characteristics
- Epoch 21 November 2025 (JD 2461000.5)
- Uncertainty parameter 0
- Observation arc: 21.58 years
- Earliest precovery date: 16 October 2001
- Aphelion: 3.719 AU
- Perihelion: 1.765 AU
- Semi-major axis: 2.742 AU
- Eccentricity: 0.35636
- Orbital period (sidereal): 4.539 years
- Mean anomaly: 131.10°
- Inclination: 10.897°
- Longitude of ascending node: 53.625°
- Argument of perihelion: 290.46°
- Earth MOID: 0.792 AU
- Jupiter MOID: 1.842 AU

Physical characteristics
- Mean radius: 0.5±0.1 km
- Sidereal rotation period: 2 hours
- Geometric albedo: 0.243
- Spectral type: (g–r) = 0.44±0.07
- Absolute magnitude (H): 17.36

2010 LH_{15} is an unnamed active asteroid located in the outer main asteroid belt. It was first discovered by the Wide-field Infrared Survey Explorer satellite between 3 and 9 June 2010, and later on October 2010 by the Catalina Sky Survey, the latter of which mistakenly identified it as a separate object named 2010 TJ_{175}. In 2023, Colin O. Chandler later reported that cometary activity was detected from DECam imagery taken in September 2019, likely caused by sublimation of material from its surface.
