= 238P/Read =

Main-belt comet

238P/Read P/2005 U1
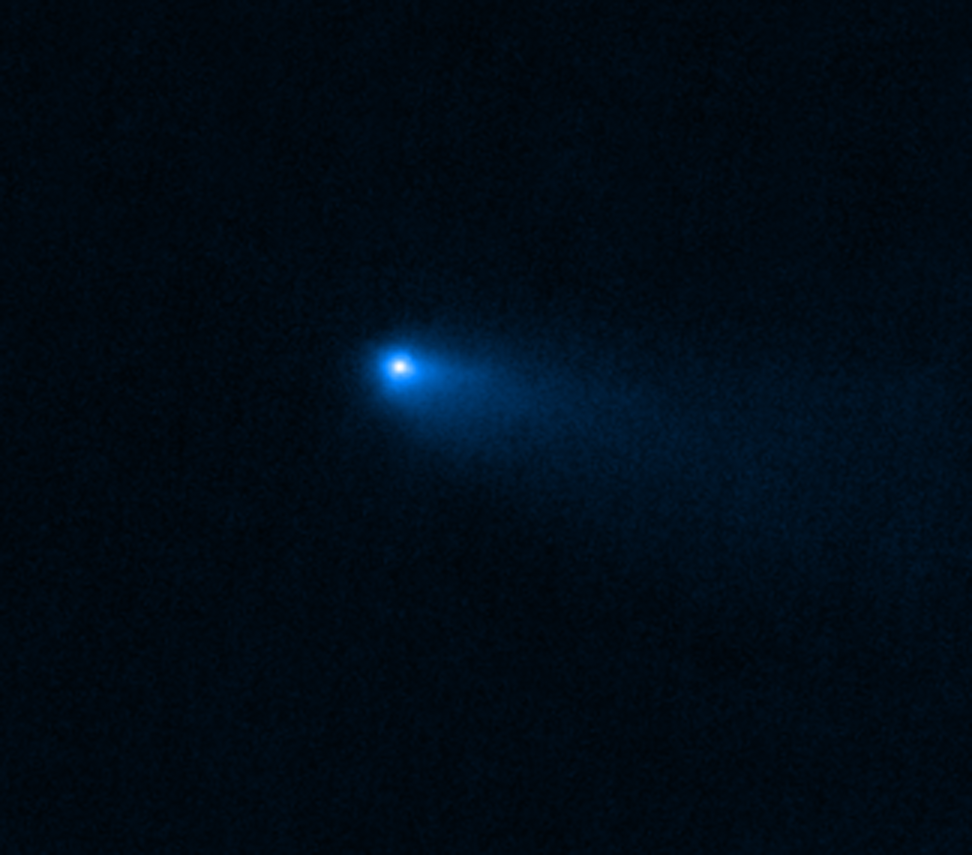
- Comet 238P/Read by the James Webb Space Telescope on September 8, 2022

Discovery
- Discovered by: Michael T. Read (Spacewatch)
- Discovery date: 24 October 2005

Designations
- Minor planet category: Main-belt comet Encke-type comet

Orbital characteristics
- Epoch 15 September 2022 (JD 2459837.5)
- Uncertainty parameter 1
- Aphelion: 3.9630 AU (Q)
- Perihelion: 2.3693 AU (q)
- Semi-major axis: 3.1662 AU (a)
- Eccentricity: 0.25167
- Orbital period (sidereal): 5.6340 yr
- Mean anomaly: 17.769° (M)
- Inclination: 1.2641°
- Longitude of ascending node: 51.625°
- Time of perihelion: 2028-Jan-24; 2022-Jun-05 (previous)
- Argument of perihelion: 324.21°
- Jupiter MOID: 1.5027 AU
- T_{Jupiter}: 3.153

Physical characteristics
- Mean diameter: 0.6 km (approx.)
- Mean density: 1.0 g/cm^{3} (assumed)
- Albedo: 0.04 (assumed)
Surface temp.	min	mean	max
Kelvin	142 K	159 K	184 K
- Apparent magnitude: 19.62 to 23.41
- Absolute magnitude (H): 20.1±0.4_{R}

238P/Read (P/2005 U1) is a main-belt comet discovered on 24 October 2005 by astronomer Michael T. Read using the Spacewatch 36-inch telescope on Kitt Peak National Observatory. It has an orbit within the asteroid belt and has displayed the coma of a traditional comet. It fits the definition of an Encke-type comet with (T_{Jupiter} > 3; a < a_{Jupiter}).

== Orbit ==
238P/Read orbits the Sun on an elliptical orbit at an average distance of 3.17 astronomical units (AU). It is located in the outer main asteroid belt, taking 5.63 years to complete an orbit. With a moderate orbital eccentricity of 0.25, its distance from the Sun ranges from 2.37 AU at perihelion to 3.96 AU at aphelion. It has a low inclination of 1.3° with respect to the ecliptic plane. It has a chaotic orbit, with a low Lyapunov time of less than 100,000 years.

238P's orbital elements place it within a dynamical association of dark asteroids known as the Gorchakov family. The Gorchakov family (whose namesake and largest member is 5014 Gorchakov) is a relatively young asteroid family, and its proximity to several mean-motion resonances with Jupiter makes many of its members' orbits highly chaotic.

== Description ==
238P was the second main-belt comet to be discovered. When it was discovered on 2005 October 24, it showed vigorous cometary activity until 2005 December 27. Outgassing likely began at least 2 months before discovery. The activity of 238P is much stronger than 133P/Elst-Pizarro and 176P/LINEAR. This may indicate that the impact assumed to have triggered 238P's activity occurred very recently.

Observations of 238P when it was inactive in 2007 suggests that it has a small nucleus only about 0.6 km in diameter.

It came to perihelion on 2011 March 10, 2016 October 22. and 2022 June 5. It will next come to perihelion on 2028 January 24.

238P/Read was the target of a mission proposal in NASA's Discovery Program in the 2010s called Proteus, however it was not selected for further development. Discovery program's founding mission was to an asteroid, but it went to a Near-Earth asteroid. A mission to a main-belt asteroid was proposed in the 1990s (also see Deep Impact (spacecraft)).

The comet was observed by James Webb Space Telescope during the 2022 perihelion and it was found spectrographicaly that its coma was composed by water vapor, due to water sublimation, and lacked significant CO_{2} coma.

== See also ==
- List of missions to comets

Numbered comets
Previous; 237P/LINEAR	238P/Read	Next; 239P/LINEAR
