= 311P/PanSTARRS =

Active asteroid and periodic comet

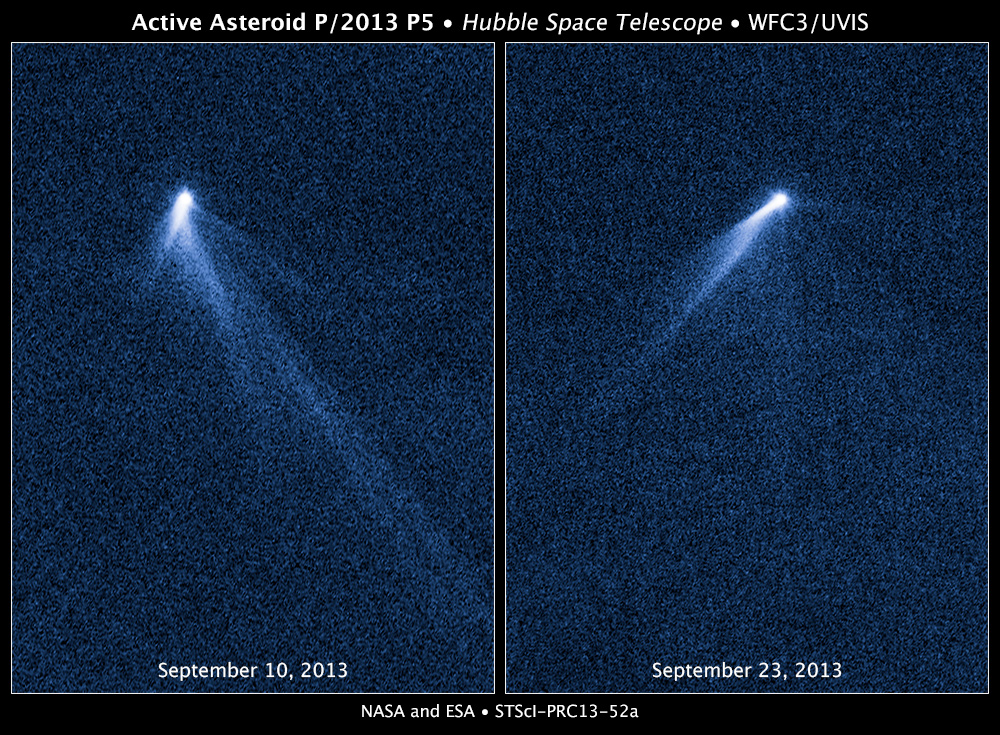
- Comet 311P/PanSTARRS imaged by the Hubble Space Telescope on 10–23 September 2013

Discovery
- Discovered by: Bryce T. Bolin
- Discovery site: Haleakala Observatory (Pan-STARRS)
- Discovery date: 27 August 2013

Designations
- MPC designation: P/2013 P5
- Alternative designations: PanSTARRS 23

Orbital characteristics
- Epoch: 21 November 2025 (JD 2461000.5)
- Observation arc: 20.29 years
- Earliest precovery date: 17 January 2005
- Number of observations: 271
- Aphelion: 2.441 AU
- Perihelion: 1.936 AU
- Semi-major axis: 2.189 AU
- Eccentricity: 0.1154
- Orbital period: 3.238 years
- Avg. orbital speed: 0.304°/d
- Inclination: 4.971°
- Longitude of ascending node: 279.17°
- Argument of periapsis: 144.32°
- Mean anomaly: 209.72°
- Last perihelion: 1 January 2024
- Next perihelion: 30 March 2027
- T_{Jupiter}: 3.661
- Earth MOID: 0.949 AU
- Jupiter MOID: 2.818 AU

Physical characteristics
- Mean diameter: ~0.48 km (0.30 mi)
- Mean density: 3.3±0.2 g/cm^{3}
- Escape velocity: ~0.240 m/s
- Synodic rotation period: ≥ 5.4 hours
- Geometric albedo: 0.29±0.09
- Comet total magnitude (M1): 18.98±0.10

311P/PanSTARRS, also known as P/2013 P5 (PanSTARRS), is an active asteroid and Encke-type comet discovered by Bryce T. Bolin using the Pan-STARRS telescope on 27 August 2013. Observations made by the Hubble Space Telescope revealed that it had six comet-like tails. The tails are suspected to be streams of material ejected by the asteroid as a result of a rubble pile asteroid spinning fast enough to remove material from it. This is similar to 331P/Gibbs, which was found to be a quickly-spinning rubble pile as well.

Three-dimensional models constructed by Jessica Agarwal of the Max Planck Institute for Solar System Research in Lindau, Germany, showed that the tails could have formed by a series of periodic impulsive dust-ejection events, (Note: "She calculated that dust-ejection events occurred on April 15, July 18, July 24, Aug. 8, Aug. 26 and Sept. 4") radiation pressure from the Sun then stretched the dust into streams.

Precovery images from the Sloan Digital Sky Survey from 2005 were found, showing negligible cometary activity in 2005.

== Physical characteristics ==
The asteroid has a radius of about 240 m (790 ft). The first images taken by Pan-STARRS revealed that the object had an unusual appearance: asteroids generally appear as small points of light, but P/2013 P5 was identified as a fuzzy-looking object by astronomers. The multiple tails were observed by the Hubble Space Telescope on 10 September 2013, Hubble later returned to the asteroid on 23 September, its appearance had totally changed. It looked as if the entire structure had swung around. The Hubble Space Telescope continued to track the object through 11 February 2014. The comet-like appearance has resulted in the asteroid being named as a comet. The object has a low orbital inclination and always stays outside the orbit of Mars.

== Possible satellite ==
On 19 April 2018, observations based on light curvature suggested a possible satellite around 311P/PanSTARRS approaching 200 meters. If true this would be one of the few minor planets designated as a comet known to harbor a satellite.

== Exploration ==
The Tianwen-2 spacecraft is planned to get in orbit around 311P/PanSTARRS in the mid-2030s. It was launched on 28 May 2025 and it will first visit and take samples from asteroid 469219 Kamoʻoalewa from late 2026 to early 2027. After returning them to Earth, it will use its close encounter with Earth for a gravity assist towards 311P/PanSTARRS. When it arrives there, it will get into orbit and conduct a remote sensing study.

== See also ==
- 354P/LINEAR, formerly known as P/2010 A2 (LINEAR)
- Yarkovsky–O'Keefe–Radzievskii–Paddack effect (YORP effect)
