= Tianwen-2 =

Chinese asteroid and comet exploration mission

Tianwen-2 天问二号
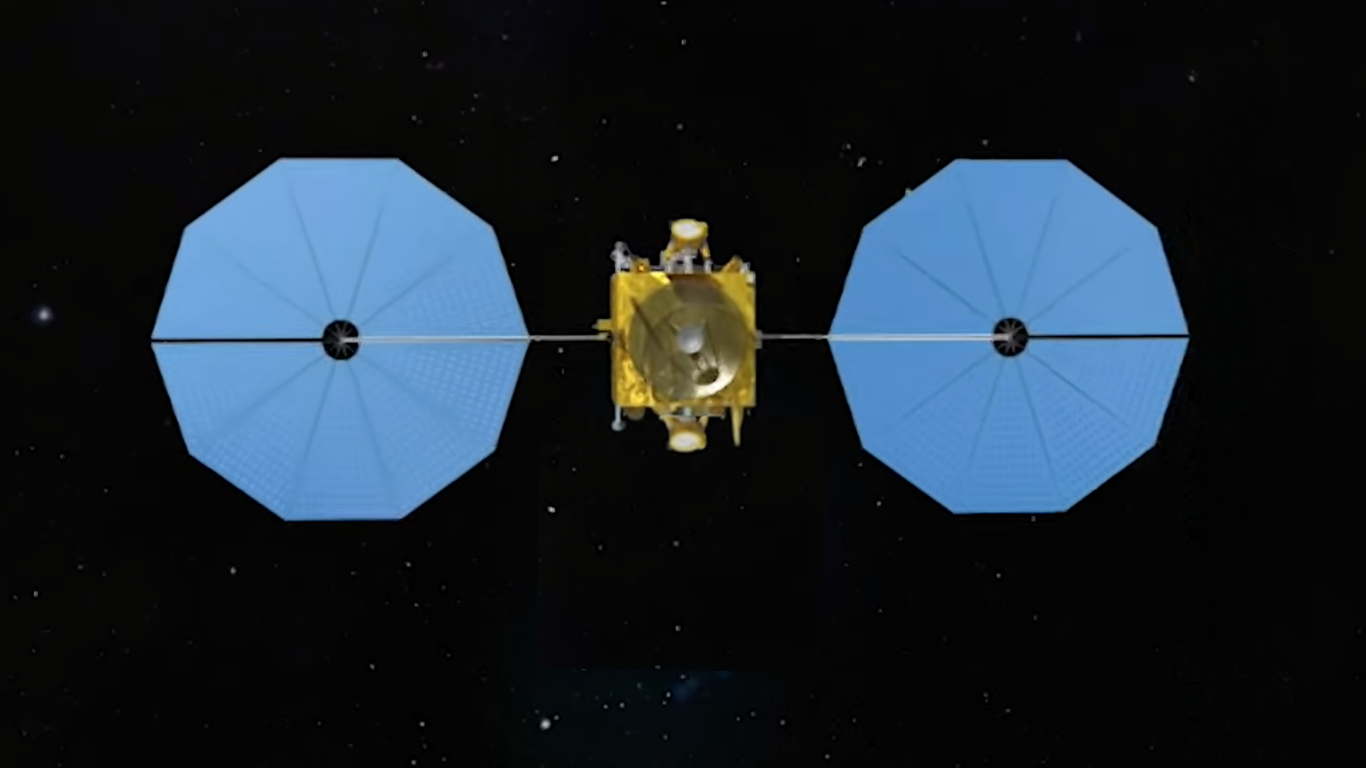
- Mission type: Asteroid sample return Comet orbiter/lander
- Operator: CNSA
- COSPAR ID: 2025-114A
- SATCAT no.: 64197
- Mission duration: 10 years (planned); 1 year, 5 months, 4 days (elapsed)

Spacecraft properties
- Manufacturer: CAST
- Launch mass: ≈2,100 kg (4,600 lb)

Start of mission
- Launch date: 28 May 2025, 17:31 UTC
- Rocket: Long March 3B
- Launch site: Xichang LC-2
- Contractor: CASC

469219 Kamoʻoalewa orbiter
- Orbital insertion: 4 July 2026
- Orbital departure: 24 April 2027
- Sample mass: ≥100 g (0.2 lb)

311P/PanSTARRS orbiter
- Orbital insertion: 24 January 2035

Tianwen-2
- Chinese: 天问二号
- Simplified Chinese: 天问二号
- Traditional Chinese: 天問二號
Transcriptions
Standard Mandarin
- Hanyu Pinyin: TiānWèn Èr Hào
- Yale Romanization: TyānWèn Èr Hàu

Tianwen-2 (Chinese: 天问二号) is a Chinese asteroid sample return and comet exploration mission that launched on 28 May 2025. It is the second mission of the Planetary Exploration of China program of the China National Space Agency (CNSA), and the only planned mission to focus on small Solar System bodies. The probe departed Xichang Satellite Launch Center on a Long March 3B rocket.

On 4 July 2026 the spacecraft arrived at 469219 Kamoʻoalewa, a near-Earth asteroid that is currently a quasi-satellite of Earth. CNSA plans for Tianwen-2 to return samples from the asteroid during an Earth flyby in 2027 by ejecting a capsule into atmospheric entry. After the flyby, the probe is planned to rendezvous with the main-belt comet 311P/PanSTARRS in January 2035, and explore it with its 11 onboard instruments.

== Overview ==
CNSA launched the Tianwen-2 probe using a Long March 3B carrier rocket on 28 May 2025 from the Xichang Satellite Launch Center in southwest China. The probe uses solar electric propulsion for maneuvering between its many objectives. It is planned to explore the co-orbital near-Earth asteroid 469219 Kamoʻoalewa and the main-belt comet 311P/PanSTARRS. The spacecraft rendezvoused with Kamoʻoalewa in July 2026 and is conducting remote sensing observations in orbit, while scouting for a sampling site. Tianwen-2 would carry out investigations at progressively lower altitudes from 20 kilometers, 3 km, 600 meters and down to 300 m from the asteroid’s surface before touching down or hovering to collect a sample of regolith. Explosives will be used to expose potential subsurface volatiles for detection.

The spacecraft will use both anchor-and-attach and touch-and-go methods to attempt collection of a sample. It would be the first time an anchor-and-attach method has been used on an asteroid, as both OSIRIS-REx and Hayabusa2 used touch-and-go.

Tianwen-2 will then return to Earth in 2027 to drop off a return capsule containing the sample and conduct a gravity assist maneuver to propel the spacecraft toward 311P/PanSTARRS. Remote sensing and in-situ measurements will be conducted at 311P/PanSTARRS for at least one year.

== History ==
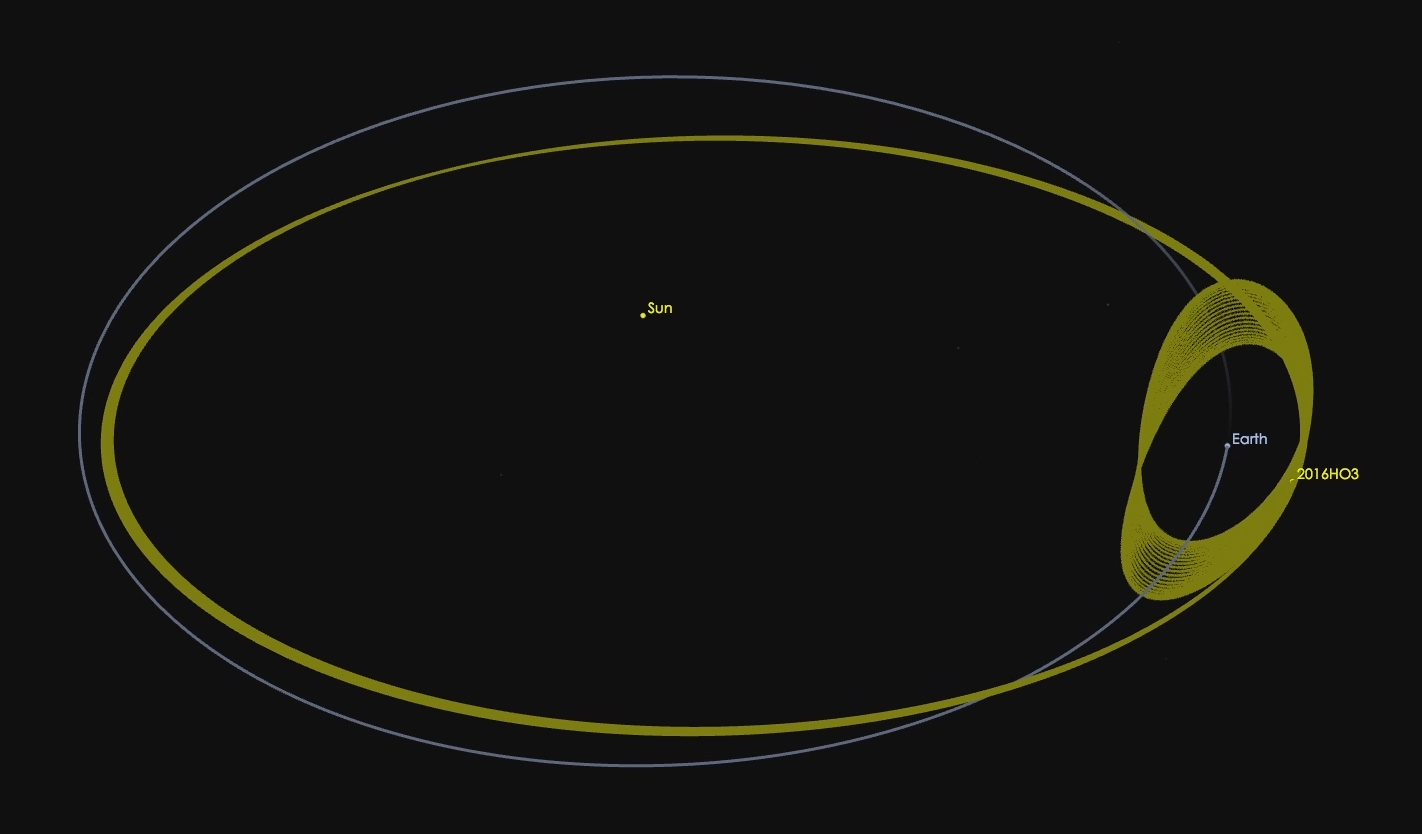
Orbit of asteroid 469219 Kamoʻoalewa

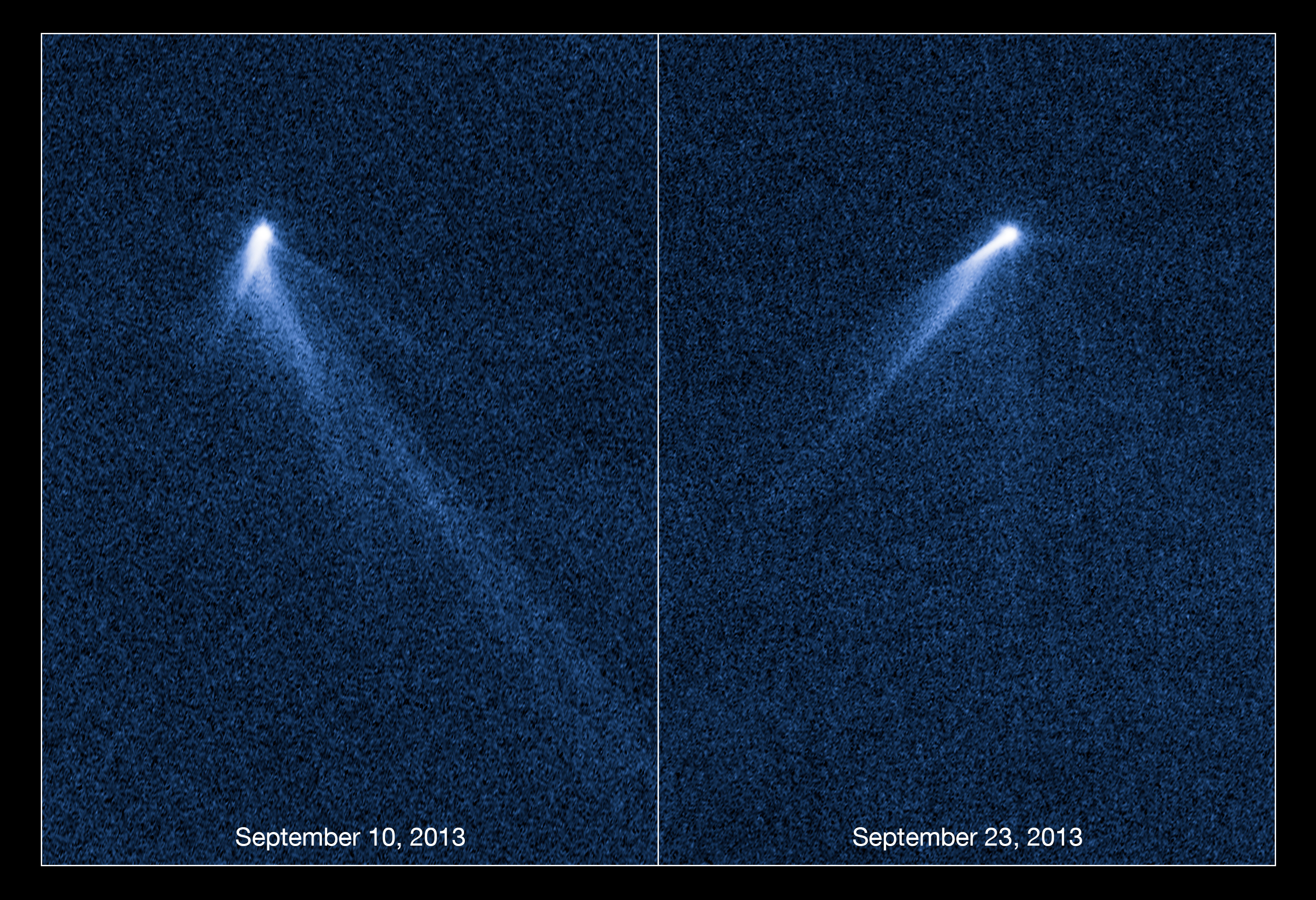
311P/PanSTARRS with six tails (September 2013).

In 2018, a deep space exploration roadmap covering the 2020–2030 timeframe was proposed by researchers at the Chinese Academy of Sciences, which included an asteroid exploration mission planned for launch around 2022 or 2024. Initially, the space probe was known as ZhengHe, with the name referencing the 15th century Ming Dynasty explorer Zheng He. In spring 2019, after a design study for the mission was carried out by the Chinese Academy of Space Technology (CAST), the CNSA began soliciting international proposals for scientific instruments to be carried on Tianwen-2.

In the planning stages, a nano-orbiter and nano-lander were proposed to be deployed to conduct remote sensing and sampling observations. Also, the original secondary target was 133P/Elst–Pizarro, and a flyby of an additional unnamed asteroid may also have been attempted.

Tianwen-2 was launched on 28 May 2025 from the Xichang Satellite Launch Center using a Long March 3B launch vehicle and was put directly on an escape trajectory from Earth, a first in the history of this launch vehicle. On 7 June 2026 the spacecraft performed an engine burn to rendezevous with the quasi-moon. Tianwen-2's close encounter with Kamoʻoalewa began on 4 July, when the spacecraft approached within 20 kilometers of the asteroid.

== Instruments ==
Tianwen-2 will incorporate several types of instruments, including wide/narrow angle multispectral and color cameras, a thermal emission spectrometer, a visible/near-infrared imaging spectrometer, a mass spectrometer, a magnetometer, and a charged/neutral particle and dust analyzer. International contributions to these payloads are being encouraged.

=== Scientific payload ===
- Visible Infrared Imaging Spectrometer
- Thermal Radiation Spectrometer
- Multispectral Camera
- Medium Field Color Camera
- Detection Radar
- Magnetometer
- Charged and Neutral Particle Analyzers
- Ejecta Analyzer
- Narrow Field of View Navigation Sensor
- Laser Integrated Navigation Sensor

== Mission timeline ==
Mission process
Flight event	Time (UTC)	Distance between spacecraft and Earth (AU)	Distance between spacecraft and Sun (AU)
Launch	28 May 2025 17:31	—	1
Spacecraft separation	28 May 2025 17:49	—	1
Deep space maneuver	30 October 2025	0.31	0.99
469219 Kamoʻoalewa Orbit insertion	7 June 2026	0.26	1.06
469219 Kamoʻoalewa rendezvous	4 July 2026	0.28	1.01
Close-up exploration of 469219 Kamoʻoalewa and sample collection	July 2026~April 2027	0.11~0.31	0.89~1.11
Leave 469219 Kamoʻoalewa	24 April 2027	0.22	1.1
Return capsule separation	29 November 2027	23,000 km	0.99
Return capsule landing	29 November 2027 09:15	—	—
Main spacecraft pull-up maneuver	29 November 2027	17,000 km	1
311P/PanSTARRS transfer	—	Farthest 3.4	1~2.38
311P/PanSTARRS rendezvous	24 January 2035	2.71	2.41
311P/PanSTARRS close-up exploration	January~April 2035	2.1~1.64	2.41~2.44

== See also ==
- Chinese space program
  - Chinese Lunar Exploration Program – Lunar research program (2004–present)
  - Planetary Exploration of China – Chinese Solar System exploration program
