= 7968 Elst–Pizarro =

Astronomical object in the Solar System

7968 Elst–Pizarro 133P/Elst–Pizarro
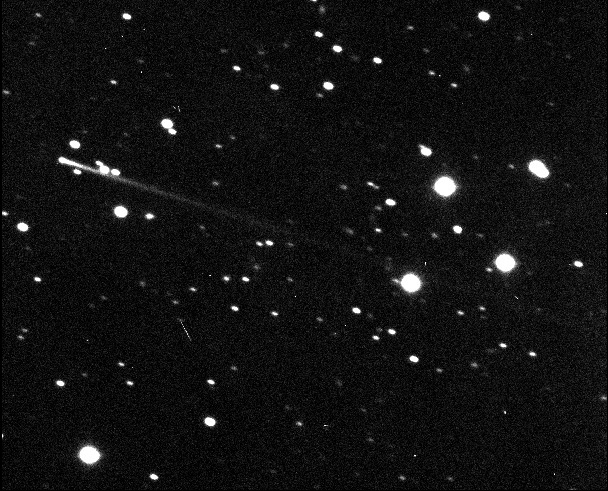
- 7968 Elst–Pizarro imaged at La Silla Observatory in August 1996. The narrow tail is visible.

Discovery
- Discovered by: 1979 OW_{7}: M. R. S. Hawkins; R. H. McNaught, S. J. Bus; 1996 N2: Eric W. Elst, Guido Pizarro
- Discovery date: 24 July 1979 (1979 OW_{7}); 14 July 1996 (1996 N2)

Designations
- Alternative designations: P/1996 N2; 1979 OW_{7}
- Minor planet category: Main-belt comet Main-belt asteroid Themis/ Beagle family

Orbital characteristics
- Epoch 13 January 2016 (JD 2457400.5)
- Uncertainty parameter 0
- Observation arc: 13350 days (36.55 yr)
- Aphelion: 3.66751 AU (548.652 Gm) (Q)
- Perihelion: 2.6524 AU (396.79 Gm) (q)
- Semi-major axis: 3.1600 AU (472.73 Gm) (a)
- Eccentricity: 0.16062 (e)
- Orbital period (sidereal): 5.62 yr (2051.7 d)
- Average orbital speed: 16.64 km/s
- Mean anomaly: 187.70° (M)
- Mean motion: 0° 10^{m} 31.656^{s} / day (n)
- Inclination: 1.3873° (i)
- Longitude of ascending node: 160.14° (Ω)
- Time of perihelion: 1 January 2030; 10 May 2024 (previous)
- Argument of perihelion: 131.97° (ω)
- Jupiter MOID: 1.51427 AU (226.532 Gm)
- T_{Jupiter}: 3.185

Physical characteristics
- Dimensions: 3.8 ± 0.6 km (2.36 ± 0.37 mi); 3.9+0.4 −0.3 km
- Mean density: 1.3 g/cm^{3} (?) (0.047 lb/cu in)
- Synodic rotation period: 3.471 h (0.1446 d)
- Geometric albedo: 0.074±0.013_{R}
- Temperature: 160 K
- Apparent magnitude: 17.24 to 20.71
- Absolute magnitude (H): 15.7; 15.3_{R} (2004); 15.49_{R} (2010)

Comet Elst–Pizarro (minor-planet designation 7968 Elst–Pizarro; comet designation 133P/Elst–Pizarro) is a body that displays characteristics of both asteroids and comets, and is the prototype of active asteroids. Its orbit keeps it within the asteroid belt, yet it displayed a dust tail like a comet while near perihelion in 1996, 2001, and 2007.

Elst–Pizarro was reported in 1979 as minor planet 1979 OW_{7}, with its image on a photographic plate being completely stellar in appearance. Its orbit remains entirely within the orbits of Mars and Jupiter, with eccentricity 0.165, typical of a minor planet in the asteroid belt. However, the images taken by Eric W. Elst and Guido Pizarro in 1996, when it was near perihelion, clearly show a cometary tail. Since this is not normal behaviour for asteroids, it is suspected that Elst–Pizarro has a different, probably icy, composition. The cometary nature of Elst–Pizarro was first discovered when a linear dust feature was observed with the ESO 1-metre Schmidt telescope at La Silla Observatory on 7 August 1996.

Subsequently, around the next perihelion in November 2001, the cometary activity appeared again, and persisted for 5 months. It again came to perihelion on 8 February 2013. The outgassing was found to happen only on a small part of the surface measuring less than 600 metres (2,000 ft) in effective diameter, likely being the relatively recent (younger than 100 million years) impact crater.

At present, there are eight other objects that are cross-listed as both comets and asteroids: 2060 Chiron (95P/Chiron), 4015 Wilson–Harrington (107P/Wilson–Harrington), 60558 Echeclus (174P/Echeclus), 118401 LINEAR (176P/LINEAR), (323137) 2003 BM80 (282P/2003 BM_{80}), (300163) 2006 VW139 (288P/2006 VW_{139}), (457175) 2008 GO98 (362P/2008 GO_{98}), and (248370) 2005 QN173 (433P/2005 QN_{173}). As a dual status object, astrometric observations of 7968 Elst–Pizarro should be reported under the minor planet designation.

== Exploration ==
Castalia is a proposed mission concept for a robotic spacecraft to explore Elst–Pizarro and make the first in situ measurements of water in the asteroid belt, and thus, help solve the mystery of the origin of Earth's water. The lead is Colin Snodgrass, from The Open University in the UK. Castalia was proposed in 2015 and 2016 to the European Space Agency within the Cosmic Vision programme missions M4 and M5, but it was not selected. The team continues to mature the mission concept and science objectives. Because of the construction time required and orbital dynamics, a launch date of October 2028 was proposed.

Castalia mission scientists are now considering instrument contributions for the Chinese ZhengHe comet exploration mission, which will conduct detailed remote sensing and in-situ measurements at Elst–Pizarro in 2032 following a proposed launch in 2025.

Numbered comets
Previous; 132P/Helin–Roman–Alu	7968 Elst–Pizarro	Next; 134P/Kowal–Vávrová
