= P/2011 S1 (Gibbs) =

Periodic comet or active centaur

Discovery
- Discovered by: Alex R. Gibbs
- Discovery site: Mount Lemmon Survey
- Discovery date: 19 September 2011

Orbital characteristics
- Epoch: 5 June 2013 (JD 2456448.5)
- Observation arc: 8.26 years
- Earliest precovery date: 29 September 2010
- Number of observations: 148
- Aphelion: 10.409 AU
- Perihelion: 6.894 AU
- Semi-major axis: 8.652 AU
- Eccentricity: 0.20315
- Orbital period: 25.448 years
- Inclination: 2.679°
- Longitude of ascending node: 218.89°
- Argument of periapsis: 193.37°
- Mean anomaly: 342.76°
- Last perihelion: 24 August 2014
- Next perihelion: 2 November 2039
- T_{Jupiter}: 3.124
- Earth MOID: 5.903 AU
- Jupiter MOID: 1.885 AU

Physical characteristics
- Mean radius: 4.0 km (2.5 mi)
- Spectral type: (B–V) = 0.96±0.11; (V–R) = 0.11±0.09; (R–I) = 0.26±0.06; (B–R) = 1.55±0.11
- Comet total magnitude (M1): 7.1
- Comet nuclear magnitude (M2): 11.5

P/2011 S1 (Gibbs) is a periodic comet or an active centaur with a 25-year orbit around the Sun.

== Discovery ==
American astronomer, Alex R. Gibbs, reported the discovery of a new object from CCD images obtained from the 1.5 m (4.9 ft) reflector telescope from the Mount Lemmon Survey on 19 September 2011. Precovery images show that the object produced comet-like activity as early as September 2010, a year before its discovery.
