= Active asteroid =

Bodies orbiting within the main asteroid belt which have shown cometary activity

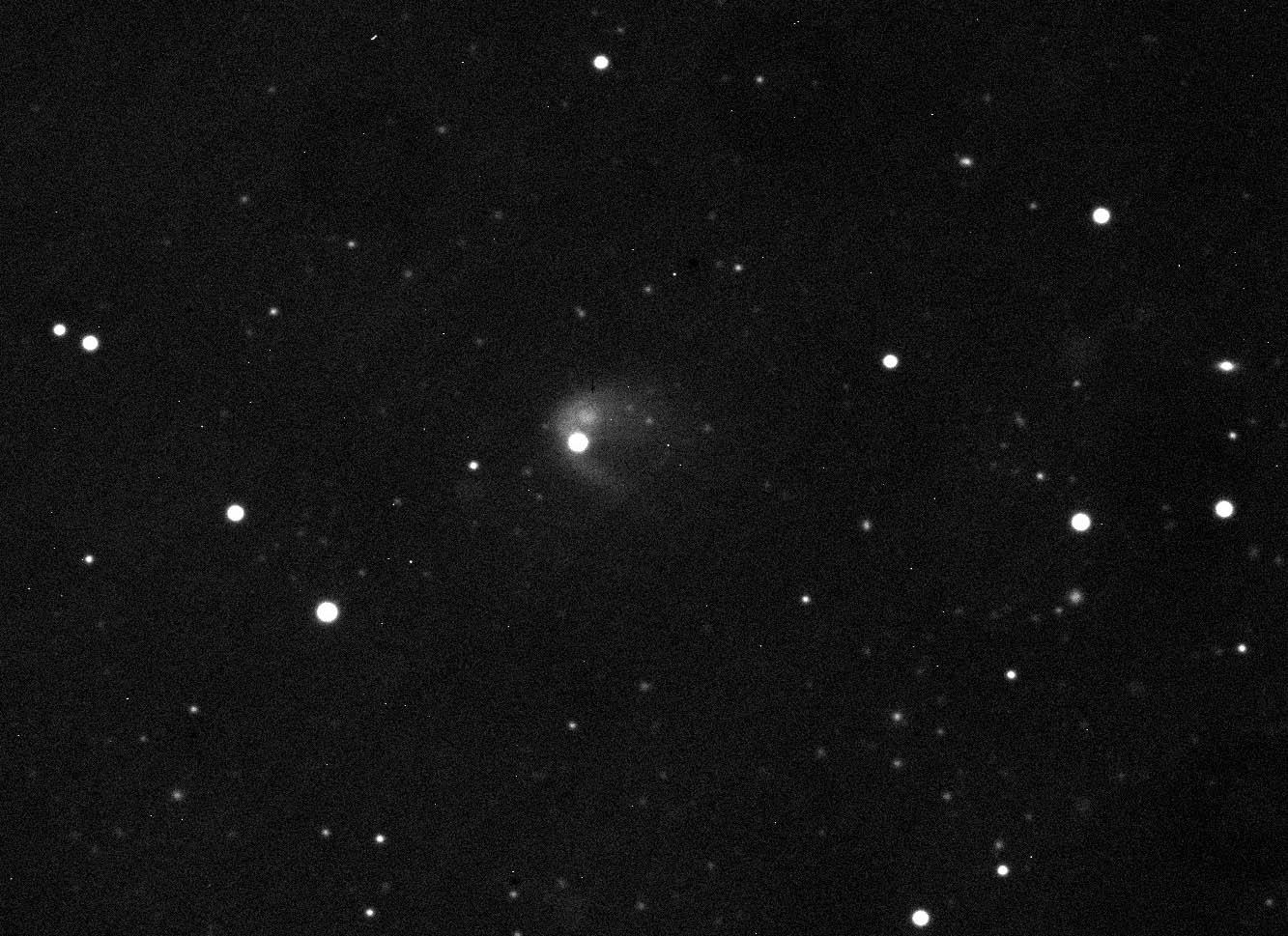
Asteroid 596 Scheila displaying a comet-like appearance on 12 December 2010

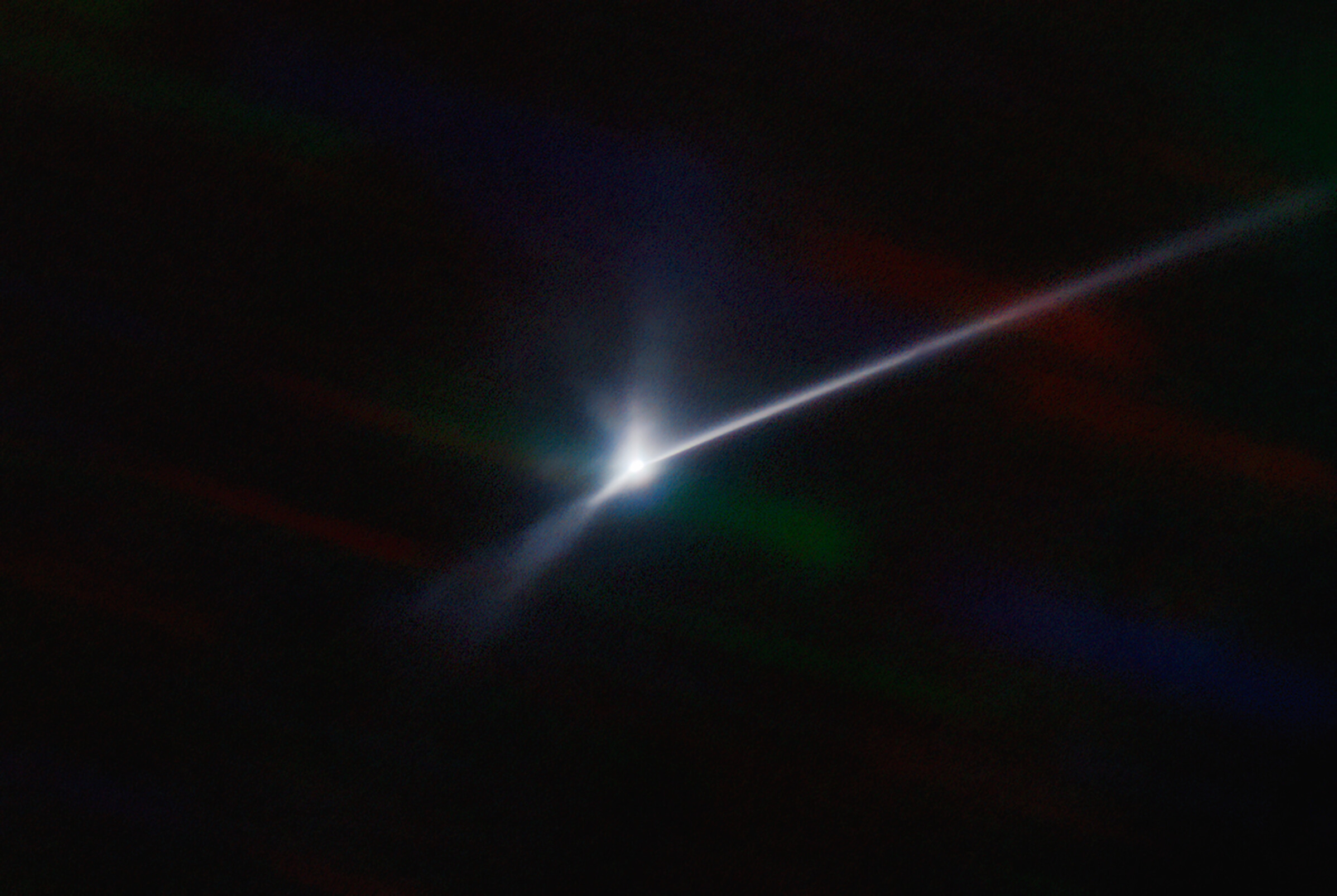
Dust ejecta and tail from the aftermath of the Double Asteroid Redirection Test's impact on the asteroid moon Dimorphos, as seen by the Southern Astrophysical Research Telescope in 2022

Active asteroids are small Solar System bodies that have asteroid-like orbits but show comet-like visual characteristics. That is, they show a coma, tail, or other visual evidence of mass-loss (like a comet), but their orbits remain within Jupiter's orbit (like an asteroid). These bodies were originally designated main-belt comets (MBCs) in 2006 by astronomers David C. Jewitt and Henry Hsieh, but this name implies they are necessarily icy in composition like a comet and that they only exist within the main-belt, whereas the growing population of active asteroids shows that this is not always the case.

The first active asteroid discovered is 7968 Elst–Pizarro. It was discovered (as an asteroid) in 1979 but then was found to have a tail by Eric Elst and Guido Pizarro in 1996 and given the cometary designation 133P/Elst–Pizarro.

== Orbits ==
Unlike comets, which spend most of their orbit at Jupiter-like or greater distances from the Sun, active asteroids follow orbits within the orbit of Jupiter that are often indistinguishable from the orbits of standard asteroids. David C. Jewitt defines active asteroids as those bodies that, in addition to having visual evidence of mass loss, have an orbit with:

- semi-major axis a < a_{Jupiter} (5.20 AU)
- Tisserand parameter with respect to Jupiter T_{J} > 3.08

Jewitt chooses 3.08 as the threshold for the Tisserand parameter (instead of 3.0, the Tisserand parameter of Jupiter itself) to separate asteroids from comets to avoid ambiguous cases caused by the real Solar System deviating from an idealized restricted three-body problem.

The first three identified active asteroids all orbit within the outer part of the asteroid belt.

== Activity ==
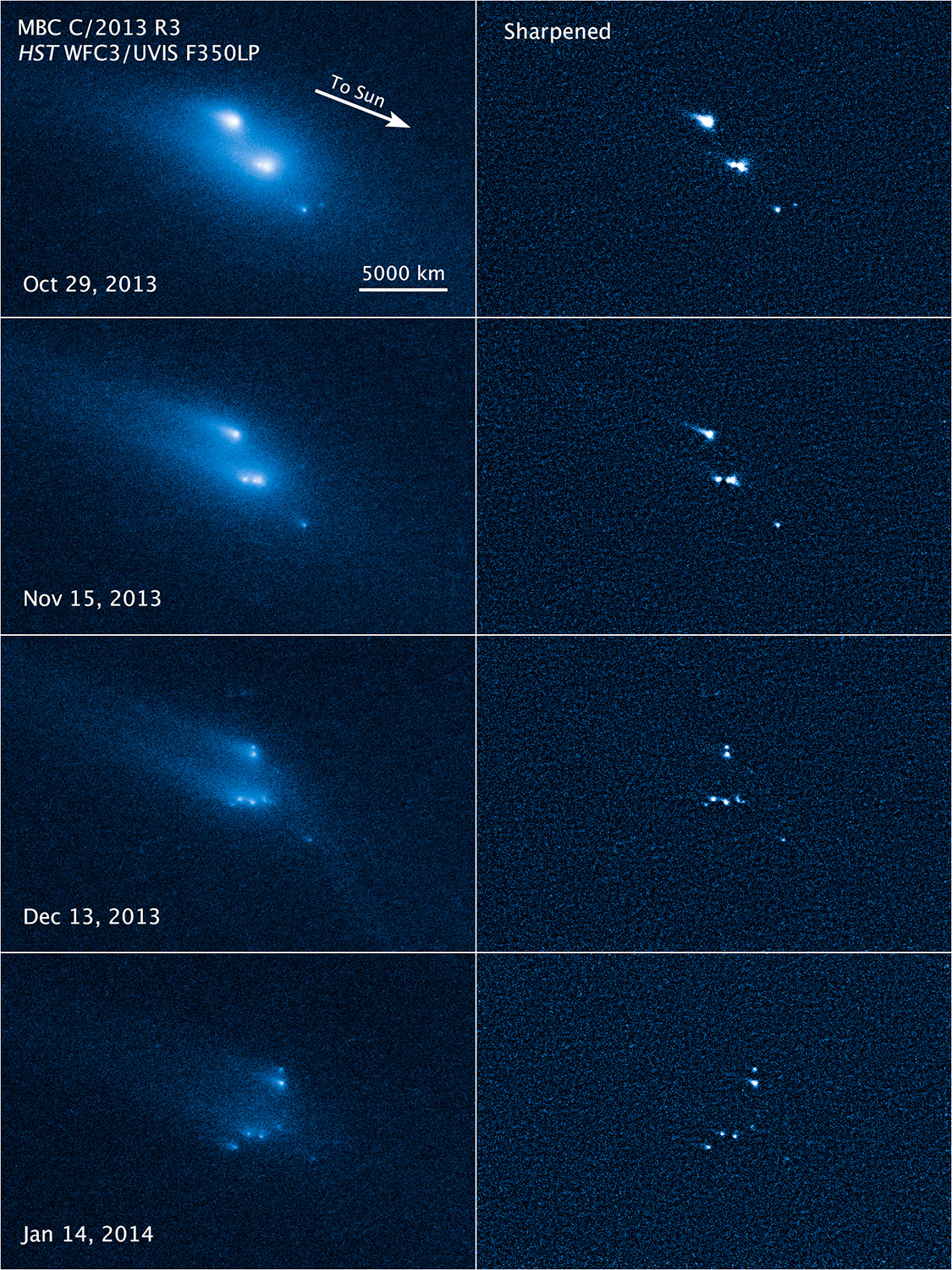
Disintegration of asteroid P/2013 R3 observed by the Hubble Space Telescope (6 March 2014).

Some active asteroids display a cometary dust tail only for a part of their orbit near perihelion. This strongly suggests that volatiles at their surfaces are sublimating, driving off the dust. Activity in 133P/Elst–Pizarro is recurrent, having been observed at each of the last three perihelia. The activity persists for a month or several out of each 5-6 year orbit, and is presumably due to ice being uncovered by minor impacts in the last 100 to 1000 years. These impacts are suspected to excavate these subsurface pockets of volatile material helping to expose them to solar radiation.

When discovered in January 2010, P/2010 A2 (LINEAR) was initially given a cometary designation and thought to be showing comet-like sublimation, but P/2010 A2 is now thought to be the remnant of an asteroid-on-asteroid impact. Observations of 596 Scheila indicated that large amounts of dust were kicked up by the impact of another asteroid of approximately 35 meters in diameter.

=== P/2013 R3 ===
P/2013 R3 (Catalina–PanSTARRS) was discovered independently by two observers by Richard E. Hill using the Catalina Sky Survey's 0.68-m Schmidt telescope and by Bryce T. Bolin using the 1.8-m Pan-STARRS1 telescope on Haleakala. The discovery images taken by Pan-STARRS1 showed the appearance of two distinct sources within 3" of each other combined with a tail enveloping both sources. In October 2013, follow-up observations of P/2013 R3, taken with the 10.4 m Gran Telescopio Canarias on the island of La Palma, showed that this comet was breaking apart. Inspection of the stacked CCD images obtained on October 11 and 12 showed that the main-belt comet presented a central bright condensation that was accompanied on its movement by three more fragments, A, B, C. The brightest A fragment was also detected at the reported position in CCD images obtained at the 1.52 m telescope of the Sierra Nevada Observatory in Granada on October 12.

NASA reported on a series of images taken by the Hubble Space Telescope between October 29, 2013, and January 14, 2014, that show the increasing separation of the four main bodies. The Yarkovsky–O'Keefe–Radzievskii–Paddack effect, caused by sunlight, increased the spin rate until the centrifugal force caused the rubble pile to separate.

=== Dimorphos ===
By smashing into the asteroid moon of the binary asteroid 65803 Didymos, NASA's Double Asteroid Redirection Test spacecraft made Dimorphos an active asteroid. Scientists had proposed that some active asteroids are the result of impact events, but no one had ever observed the activation of an asteroid. The DART mission activated Dimorphos under precisely known and carefully observed impact conditions, enabling the detailed study of the formation of an active asteroid for the first time. Observations show that Dimorphos lost approximately 1 million kilograms after the collision. Impact produced a dust plume that temporarily brightened the Didymos system and developed a 10,000-kilometer (6,200 mi)-long dust tail that persisted for several months. The DART impact is predicted to have caused global resurfacing and deformation of Dimorphos's shape, leaving an impact crater several tens of meters in diameter. The impact has likely sent Dimorphos into a chaotically tumbling rotation that will subject the moon to irregular tidal forces by Didymos before it will eventually return to a tidally locked state within several decades.

== The problem of threshold detection ==
The definition of comet is, in principle, the presence of volatiles such as water ice. In practice, composition usually cannot be measured directly for distant, faint bodies, so most comets are identified by having transient, unbound atmospheres (usually made visible by the scattering of sunlight from entrained micron-sized dust particles) — a coma, and/or tail. Asteroids, then, are defined as non-cometary.

Whether a coma or tail is detected on a given object depends strongly on the parameters of the observing system used. Activity is transient in nature (see e.g. 3552 Don Quixote), and its presence or absence are only qualitative. A puny telescope may not reveal a coma that is easily rendered visible by a more powerful one. There is neither an agreed quantitative ice fraction with which to divide comets from asteroids nor, more importantly, any reliable way to measure the ice fraction in a small body. The simple labels "asteroid" or "comet" then are inadequate for the continuum phenomena.

A small Solar-System body is observationally an active asteroid if, despite a low-inclination and low-eccentricity orbit, a coma and/or tail are visible. This is phenomenological, yet some objective measurement is possible. Small bodies (km-scale) are below the resolution limit of all but the largest telescopes; the bodies should then appear as "pointlike" (specifically, the point spread function of the telescope). Comas, and especially tails, are significantly larger than nuclei; they are more likely to exceed the resolution limit and be "extended objects" in that telescope configuration.

The OSIRIS-REx mission, despite directly targeting 101955 Bennu, failed to detect its activity on its approach in September 2018. Activity was then apparent from Bennu orbit, in 2019.

== Activity mechanisms ==
The following are not mutually exclusive. They were either unsuspected or thought to lie beyond the realm of observation before the discovery of asteroid activity:

Sublimation: Volatiles escape from the object, diffusing away.

Rotational instability: The centrifugal forces on body particles exceed the body's mechanical strength and gravity.

Thermal cycling and cracking: A diurnal cycle leads to thermal expansions, and eventual fatigue.

Impact: An external body confers kinetic energy to the body's exterior, launching ejecta.

Electrostatics: Ionization from the Sun, cosmic rays, etc. cause surface particles to repel each other.

Radiation pressure: Small particles, once lofted, are swept away due to low gravity and a high specific surface area.

A commonly hypothesized multi-cause is impact into a dormant object; the resulting crater exposes volatiles from beneath a formerly-shielding crust. Weak sublimation may be assisted by a short rotation period, lowering the effective gravity. On the other hand, a rotationally-destabilized body may continue splitting via sublimation from now-exposed surfaces.

Hainault et al. expand upon rotational instability: 311P/Pan-STARRS and (6478) Gault are posited to be "rubbing binaries." Before clearly turning from binary object to bilobate object, the two components may scrape mass from each other until eventually fusing.

Work regarding Phaethon has expanded inquiry into the sublimation process. Both Phaethon's close orbit and spectra of Geminid meteors have shown that what constitutes a "volatile" depends on the arbitrary level of temperature chosen.

== Composition ==
Some active asteroids show signs that they are icy in composition like a traditional comet, while others are known to be rocky like an asteroid. It has been hypothesized that main-belt comets may have been the source of Earth's water, because the deuterium–hydrogen ratio of Earth's oceans is too low for classical comets to have been the principal source. European scientists have proposed a sample-return mission from a MBC called Caroline to analyse the content of volatiles and collect dust samples.

== Exploration ==
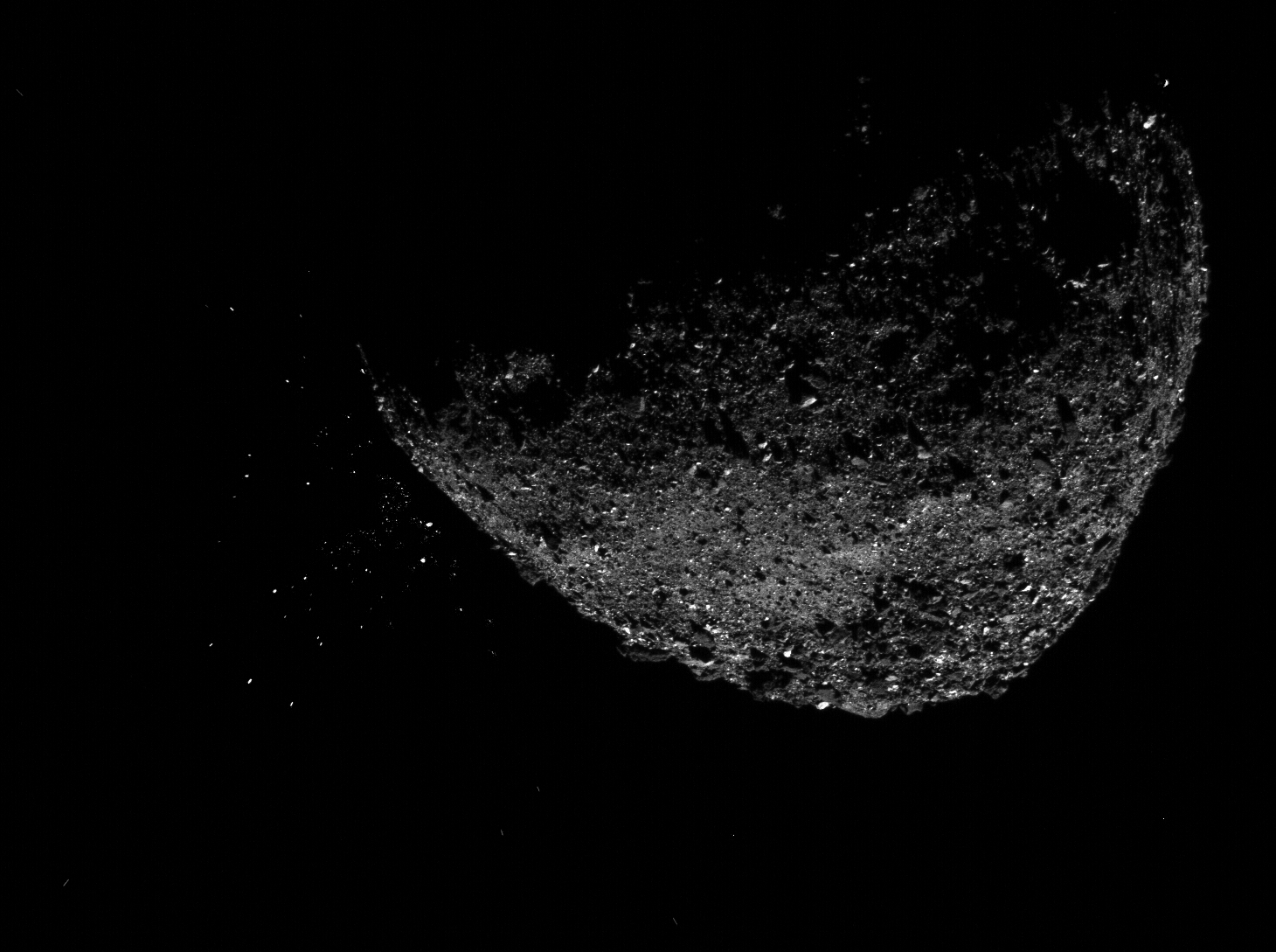
Asteroid 101955 Bennu seen ejecting particles on 6 January 2019, in images taken by the OSIRIS-REx spacecraft

JAXA's DESTINY+ is a planned mission to fly by 3200 Phaethon and collect a dust sample. The mission is planned to be launched in fiscal year 2028.

Castalia is a proposed mission concept for a robotic spacecraft to explore 133P/Elst–Pizarro and make the first in situ measurements of water in the asteroid belt, and thus, help solve the mystery of the origin of Earth's water. Castalia was proposed in 2015 and 2016 to the European Space Agency within the Cosmic Vision programme missions M4 and M5, but it was not selected. The team continues to mature the mission concept and science objectives. Because of the construction time required and orbital dynamics, a launch date of October 2028 was proposed.

On January 6, 2019, the OSIRIS-REx mission first observed episodes of particle ejection from 101955 Bennu shortly after entering orbit around the near-Earth asteroid, leading it to be newly classified as an active asteroid and marking the first time that asteroid activity had been observed up close by a spacecraft. It has since observed at least 10 other such events. The scale of these observed mass loss events is much smaller than those previously observed at other active asteroids by telescopes, indicating that there is a continuum of mass loss event magnitudes at active asteroids.

=== Meteorites ===
We may have samples of active asteroids in meteorite/dust collections. Interplanetary dust particles are being collected and returned by airplanes, high-altitude balloons, and low-orbit spacecraft. Collecting such particles is a relatively inexpensive way of studying the composition and microstructure of small, Earth-crossing bodies.

The Geminid shower has been observed to contain meteoroids large enough to survive atmospheric entry. The recovery of a meteorite originating from asteroid Phaethon "would undoubtedly be a major milestone."

Some researchers, including Henning Haack, have speculated that the Sutter's Mill or Maribo meteorites are fragments from the Taurid meteor complex, and hence from a parent in a NEO-like orbit — either 2P/Encke (itself considered a weak comet), or an active asteroid in the complex.

== List ==
Identified members of this morphology class (T_{Jup}>3.08) include:

Name	Semi-major axis (AU)	Perihelion (AU)	Eccentricity	T_{Jup}	Orbital class	Diameter (km)	Rotation period (hr)	Mechanism	Activity discovery year	Recurrent?
1 Ceres	2.766	2.550	0.078	3.310	main-belt (middle)	939.4	9.07	Water sublimation	2014	
493 Griseldis	3.116	2.568	0.176	3.140	main-belt (outer)	41.56	51.94	Impact	2015	✗
596 Scheila	2.929	2.45	0.163	3.209	main-belt (outer)	159.72	15.85	Impact	2011	✗
2201 Oljato	2.174	0.624	0.713	3.299	NEO (Apollo)	1.8	>26	Sublimation	1984	✗
3200 Phaethon	1.271	0.140	0.890	4.510	NEO (Apollo)	6.26	3.60	Thermal fracturing, dehydration cracking, and/or rotational disintegration	2010	✓
6478 Gault	2.305	1.860	0.193	3.461	main-belt (inner)	5.6	2.49	Rotational disintegration	2019	✓
(62412) 2000 SY_{178}	3.159	2.909	0.079	3.197	main-belt (outer)	10.38	3.33	Rotational disintegration	2014	✗
65803 Didymos/Dimorphos	1.643	1.013	0.383	4.204	NEO (Apollo)	0.77 / 0.15	2.26	Human-caused impact	2022	✗
101955 Bennu	1.126	0.896	0.204	5.525	NEO (Apollo)	0.48	4.29	(unknown); Electrostatic lofting, impacts, thermal fracturing, or dehydration cracking	2019	✓
(588045) 2007 FZ_{18}	3.176	2.783	0.124	3.188	main-belt (outer)				2023	
(875163) 1998 SH2	2.743	0.785	0.71379	2.913	NEO (Apollo)	0.383			2025	
2002 CW_{116}	2.690	2.068	0.231	3.319	main-belt (middle)	0.5			2024	
2008 BJ_{22}	3.071	2.943	0.042	3.199	main-belt (outer)	<0.4			2022	✗
2010 LH15	2.744	1.770	0.355	3.230	main-belt (middle)	1.483			2023	✓
2015 BC_{566}	3.062	2.957	0.034	3.201	main-belt (outer)				2023	✗
2015 FW_{412}	2.765	2.319	0.161	3.280	main-belt (middle)				2023	
2015 VA_{108}	3.128	2.451	0.217	3.160	main-belt (outer)				2023	
P/2023 JN16	2.696	2.300	0.147	3.351	main-belt (middle)				2023	
107P/4015 Wilson–Harrington	2.625	0.966	0.632	3.082	NEO (Apollo)	6.92	7.15	Sublimation	1949	✗
133P/7968 Elst–Pizarro	3.165	2.668	0.157	3.184	main-belt (outer)	3.8	3.47	Sublimation/rotational disintegration	1996	✓
176P/118401 LINEAR	3.194	2.578	0.193	3.167	main-belt (outer)	4.0	22.23	Sublimation	2005	✗
233P/La Sagra (P/2009 WJ_{50})	3.033	1.786	0.411	3.081	main-belt (outer)	3.0			2010	✗
238P/Read (P/2005 U1)	3.162	2.362	0.253	3.153	main-belt (outer)	0.8		Sublimation	2005	✓
259P/Garradd (P/2008 R1)	2.727	1.794	0.342	3.217	main-belt (middle)	0.60		Sublimation	2008	✓
288P/(300163) 2006 VW_{139}	3.051	2.438	0.201	3.203	main-belt (outer)	1.8 / 1.2		Sublimation	2011	✓
311P/PanSTARRS (P/2013 P5)	2.189	1.935	0.116	3.660	main-belt (inner)	0.4	>5.4	Rotational disintegration	2013	✓
313P/Gibbs (P/2003 S10)	3.154	2.391	0.242	3.133	main-belt (outer)	2.0		Sublimation	2003	✓
324P/La Sagra (P/2010 R2)	3.098	2.621	0.154	3.099	main-belt (outer)	1.1		Sublimation	2010	✓
331P/Gibbs (P/2012 F5)	3.005	2.879	0.042	3.228	main-belt (outer)	3.54	3.24	Rotational disintegration	2012	✗
354P/LINEAR (P/2010 A2)	2.290	2.004	0.125	3.583	main-belt (inner)	0.12	11.36	Impact	2010	✗
358P/PanSTARRS (P/2012 T1)	3.155	2.410	0.236	3.134	main-belt (outer)	0.64		Sublimation	2012	✗
426P/PanSTARRS (P/2019 A7)	3.188	2.675	0.161	3.103	main-belt (outer)	2.4			2019	✗
427P/ATLAS (P/2017 S5)	3.171	2.178	0.313	3.092	main-belt (outer)	0.90	1.4	Sublimation/rotational disintegration	2017	✗
432P/PanSTARRS (P/2021 N4)	3.045	2.302	0.244	3.170	main-belt (outer)	<1.4			2021	✗
433P/(248370) 2005 QN_{173}	3.067	2.374	0.226	3.192	main-belt (outer)	3.2		Sublimation/rotational disintegration	2021	✓
435P/PanSTARRS (P/2021 T3)	3.018	2.056	0.319	3.090	main-belt (outer)				2021	✗
455P/PanSTARRS (P/2021 S9)	3.156	2.193	0.305	3.087	main-belt (outer)	<1.6			2017	✗
456P/PanSTARRS (P/2021 L4)	3.165	2.788	0.119	3.125	main-belt (outer)	<4.4			2021	✗
457P/2020 O1 (Lemmon–PanSTARRS)	2.647	2.329	0.120	3.376	main-belt (middle)	0.84	1.67	Sublimation/rotational disintegration	2020	✓
483P/PanSTARRS (P/2016 J1)	3.172	2.449	0.228	3.113	main-belt (outer)	<1.8 / <0.8		Sublimation	2016	✓
P/2013 R3 (Catalina–PanSTARRS)	3.033	2.205	0.273	3.184	main-belt (outer)	~0.4		Sublimation/rotational disintegration	2013	✗
P/2015 X6 (PanSTARRS)	2.755	2.287	0.170	3.318	main-belt (middle)	<1.4		Sublimation	2015	✗
P/2016 G1 (PanSTARRS)	2.583	2.041	0.210	3.367	main-belt (middle)	<0.8		Impact	2016	✗
P/2018 P3 (PanSTARRS)	3.007	1.756	0.416	3.096	main-belt (outer)	<1.2		Sublimation	2018	✓
P/2019 A3 (PanSTARRS)	3.147	2.313	0.265	3.099	main-belt (outer)	<0.8			2019	✗
P/2019 A4 (PanSTARRS)	2.614	2.379	0.090	3.365	main-belt (middle)	0.34			2019	✗
P/2021 A5 (PanSTARRS)	3.047	2.620	0.140	3.147	main-belt (outer)	0.30		Sublimation	2021	✗
P/2021 R8 (Sheppard)	3.019	2.131	0.294	3.179	main-belt (outer)				2021	✗
P/2022 R5 (PanSTARRS)	3.071	2.470	0.196	3.148	main-belt (outer)				2022	
P/2023 S4 (Hogan)	3.134	2.542	0.189	3.185	main-belt (outer)				2023	
P/2024 L4 (Rankin)	2.231	0.672	0.699	3.255	NEO (apollo)	<0.4		Rotational disintegration?	2024	
P/2024 R2 (PANSTARRS)	3.138	2.302	0.266	3.104	main-belt (outer)				2024	

== See also ==
- Centaur (minor planet)
- Extinct comet
- Active Asteroids (citizen science project)
