= 331P/Gibbs =

Active asteroid

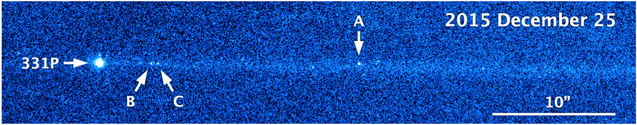
- Fragments and dust trail of comet 331P/Gibbs as seen from the Hubble Space Telescope on 25 December 2015.

Discovery
- Discovered by: Alex R. Gibbs
- Discovery site: Mount Lemmon Survey
- Discovery date: 22 March 2012

Designations
- MPC designation: P/2012 F5
- Alternative designations: Gibbs 14

Orbital characteristics
- Epoch: 21 November 2025 (JD 2461000.5)
- Observation arc: 21.30 years (Note: Observation arc from the Minor Planet Center database covering dates from 26 August 2004 until 12 December 2025.)
- Earliest precovery date: 26 August 2004
- Number of observations: 213
- Aphelion: 3.127 AU
- Perihelion: 2.878 AU
- Semi-major axis: 3.003 AU
- Eccentricity: 0.04142
- Orbital period: 5.203 years
- Inclination: 9.741°
- Longitude of ascending node: 216.74°
- Argument of periapsis: 185.75°
- Mean anomaly: 353.49°
- Last perihelion: 25 December 2025
- Next perihelion: 16 March 2031
- T_{Jupiter}: 3.228
- Earth MOID: 1.886 AU
- Jupiter MOID: 2.087 AU

Physical characteristics
- Mean diameter: 1.77 km (1.10 mi)
- Synodic rotation period: 3.24±0.01 hours
- Comet total magnitude (M1): 16.8

331P/Gibbs (P/2012 F5) is a small Encke-type comet and active asteroid, discovered by American astronomer Alex Gibbs.

== Description ==
It is a rare type of comet called a main-belt comet. Although most comets come from the Oort cloud or the Kuiper belt, main-belt comets are instead members of the asteroid belt that have a coma and tail. As of 2016, it is one of only 15 known main-belt comets.

Precovery observations of 331P/Gibbs in Sloan Digital Sky Survey data were found dating to August 2004, in which the object was visible as a regular asteroid. Further observations in 2014 by the Keck Observatory showed that the comet was fractured into 5 pieces and rotating rapidly, with a rotation period of only 3.2 hours. Due to the YORP effect, 331P/Gibbs had begun to spin so quickly that, being a likely rubble pile, parts began to be thrown off, leaving a very long dust trail. This is very similar to 311P/PanSTARRS, being the best-established cause for main-belt comets along with impacts between small asteroids (such as with 596 Scheila and 354P/LINEAR).

== Orbit ==
The orbit of 331P/Gibbs is found within the dynamically cold region of the outer asteroid belt at distances between 2.88–3.13 AU (431–468 million km) from the Sun. A 2014 study revealed that it is a member of a previously unknown extremely compact cluster of nine asteroids now known as the Gibbs cluster, (Note: Members of this cluster include; 20674 (1999 VT_{1}), 140429 (2001 TQ_{96}), 177075 (2003 FR_{36}), 249738 (2000 SB_{159}), 257134 (2008 GY_{132}), 321490 (2009 SH_{54}), 341222 (2007 RT_{138}), and 496996 (2002 TF_{325}).) which was likely formed by a catastrophic collision event of their parent body more than 1.5 million years ago. Its orbit in the outer main belt is dynamically stable over timescales of 1 billion years.

== Notes ==
Numbered comets
Previous; 330P/Catalina	331P/Gibbs	Next; 332P/Ikeya-Murakami
