= Kathrin Altwegg =

Professor of astrophysics

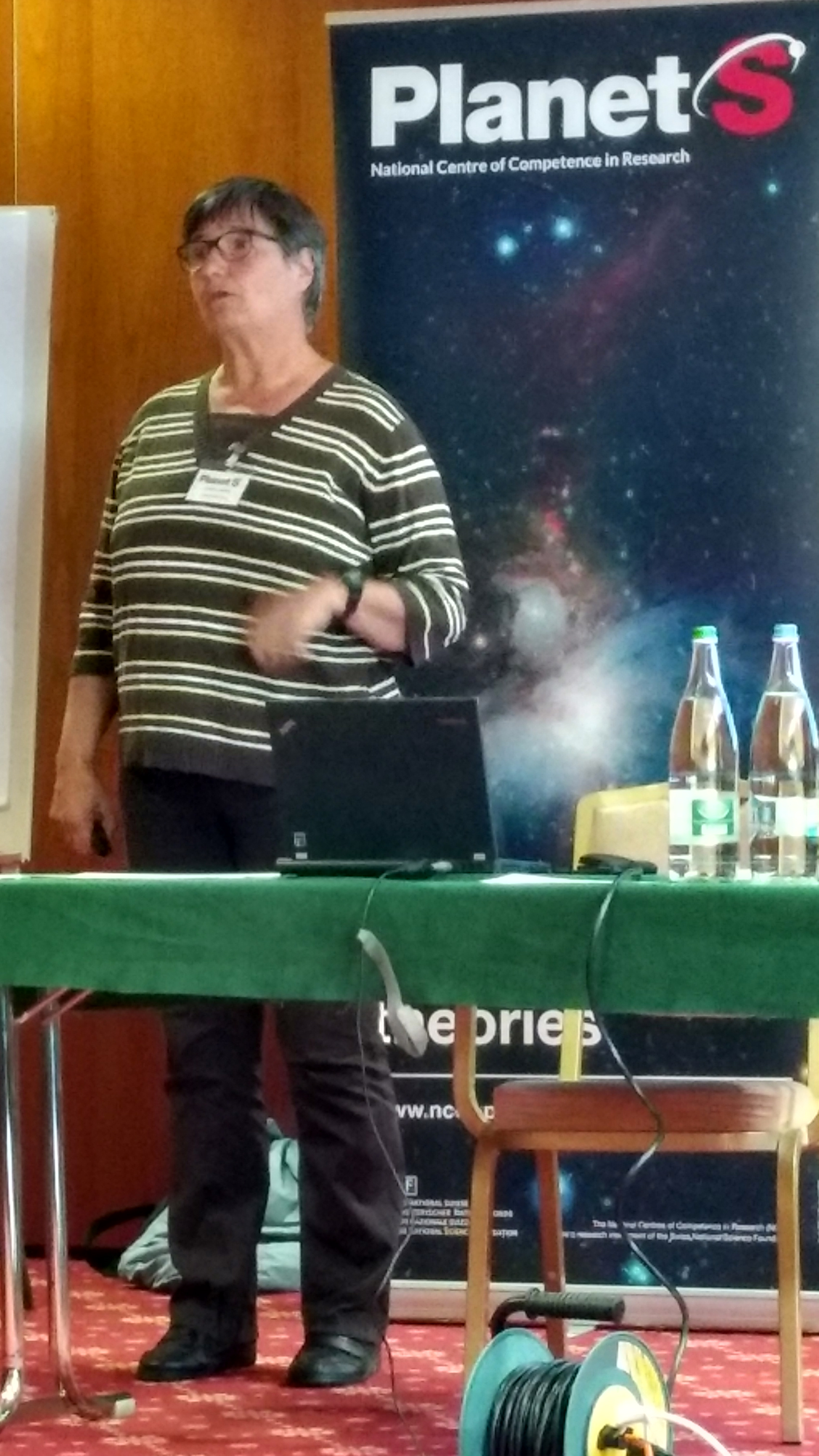
- Born: 11 December 1951 (age 74); Balsthal, Switzerland
- Education: University of Basel
- Known for: Rosetta
- Scientific career
- Fields: Astrophysics
- Institutions: University of Bern

Kathrin Altwegg is an astrophysicist, who is an associate professor in the Department of Space Research and Planetology, and former director of the Center for Space and Habitability at the University of Bern. She is a member of the International Astronomical Union.

== Early life ==
Kathrin Altwegg was born on 11 December 1951 in Balsthal. Between 1957 and 1970, she completed her primary education in Balsthal and passed the High school diploma in Switzerland at the lycée in Solothurn.

== Education and research career ==
In 1975, she graduated studying physics at University of Basel, where she was the only woman in her year. In 1980, she obtained her doctorate in experimental physics from the University of Basel and proceeded to undertake post-doctoral research in the physics-chemistry department of the University of Technology, Design and Architecture, in New York.

In 1982, she returned to Switzerland, where she gained a position at the University of Bern, in the space exploration and planetology department. In 1996, she passed her university accreditation in the field of solar system physics and became project manager of the project -2001.html ROSINA (Rosetta Orbiter Spectrometer for Ion and Neutral Analysis) concerning the comet 67P/Churyumov–Gerasimenko. Since 2001, she has been a full professor and researcher, with the title of associate professor, at the department of space research and planetology at the University of Bern.

== Prizes and awards ==
In 2015, she received the prize of the Commerce and Industry association of Bern 2015 for her mission in the Rosetta project but also for her commitment to young people.
