= (323137) 2003 BM80 =

Main-belt comet

(323137) 2003 BM_{80} 282P/2003 BM_{80}
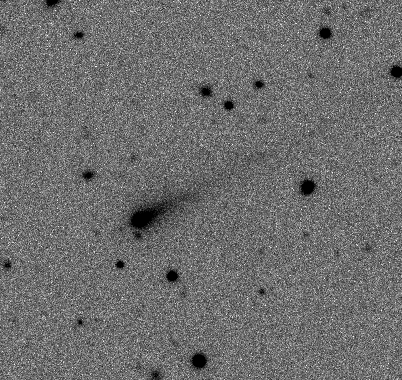
- DECam image, showing the comet activity in March 2021

Discovery
- Discovered by: LONEOS
- Discovery site: Anderson Mesa Stn.
- Discovery date: 31 January 2003

Designations
- MPC designation: (323137) 2003 BM_{80}
- Alternative designations: 282P/2003 BM_{80} · 2003 FV_{112}
- Minor planet category: main-belt · (outer) main-belt comet

Orbital characteristics
- Epoch 1 July 2021 (JD 2459396.5)
- Uncertainty parameter 0
- Observation arc: 19.44 yr (7,101 d)
- Aphelion: 5.04 AU
- Perihelion: 3.44 AU
- Semi-major axis: 4.24 AU
- Eccentricity: 0.189
- Orbital period (sidereal): 8.73 yr (3,190 d)
- Mean anomaly: 347°
- Mean motion: 0° 6^{m} 46.8^{s} / day
- Inclination: 5.81°
- Longitude of ascending node: 9.3°
- Time of perihelion: 3 July 2030
- Argument of perihelion: 218°
- Jupiter MOID: 0.176 AU
- T_{Jupiter}: 2.991

Physical characteristics
- Mean diameter: 9.4 km (est. at 0.07)
- Absolute magnitude (H): 13.63

(323137) 2003 BM_{80}, cometary designation 282P/2003 BM_{80}, is an asteroid and main-belt comet from the outer regions of the asteroid belt, approximately 9.4 kilometers (5.8 miles) in diameter. It was discovered on 31 January 2003 by astronomers of the LONEOS program conducted at Anderson Mesa Station near Flagstaff, Arizona, in the United States.

== Orbit and classification ==
2003 BM_{80} is a main-belt comet with a Jupiter Tisserand's parameter of 2.99. It orbits the Sun in the outer asteroid belt at a distance of 3.4–5.1 AU once every 8 years and 9 months (3,199 days; semi-major axis of 4.25 AU). Its orbit has an eccentricity of 0.19 and an inclination of 6° with respect to the ecliptic.

The body's observation arc begins with its first precovery observation by the NEAT program in December 2001, more than a year before its official discovery observation at Anderson Mesa.

In 2022 a team from Northern Arizona University determined that 2003 BM_{80} is a quasi-Hilda Object with a sustained activity outburst, lasting over 15 months. Their dynamical simulations showed that this object has undergone at least five close encounters with Jupiter and one with Saturn over the last 180 years. It was likely a centaur or Jupiter family comet 250 years ago. In the future, this object will have about 15 strong interactions with Jupiter, and 380 years in the future, it might become again a Jupiter family comet. But it could also become a main-belt asteroid.

== Numbering and naming ==
This minor planet was numbered by the Minor Planet Center on 6 April 2012. As of 2021, it has not been named.

== Physical characteristics ==
Based on a generic magnitude-to-diameter conversion, 2003 BM_{80} measures approximately 4.4 kilometers in diameter using an absolute magnitude of 15.3 and an estimated albedo 0.07, typical for rather dark cometary-like bodies.

As of 2021, no rotational lightcurve of 2003 BM_{80} has been obtained from photometric observations. The body's rotation period, shape and spin axis remain unknown.
