= (248370) 2005 QN173 =

Active asteroid in the outer main belt

(248370) 2005 QN_{173}
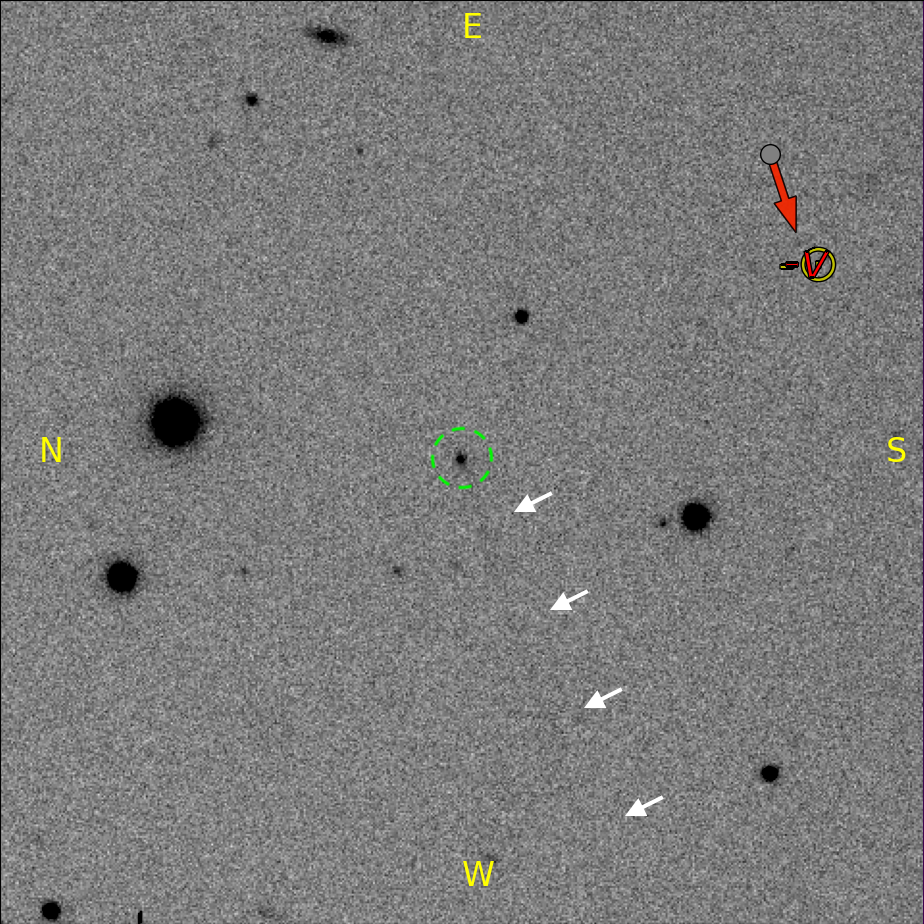
- Cerro Tololo Observatory image of 2005 QN_{173} with a long, narrow tail (indicated with white arrows) on July 22, 2016

Discovery
- Discovered by: NEAT
- Discovery site: Palomar Observatory
- Discovery date: August 29, 2005

Designations
- Minor planet category: main-belt · (outer)

Orbital characteristics
- Epoch February 25, 2023 (JD 2460000.5)
- Uncertainty parameter 0
- Observation arc: 8,055 d (22.05 yr)
- Aphelion: 3.755 AU (561.7 Gm)
- Perihelion: 2.374 AU (355.1 Gm)
- Semi-major axis: 3.064 AU (458.4 Gm)
- Eccentricity: 0.2254
- Orbital period (sidereal): 1,959 d (5.36 yr)
- Mean anomaly: 119.934°
- Mean motion: 0° 11^{m} 1.494^{s} / day
- Inclination: 0.068°
- Longitude of ascending node: 174.334°
- Time of perihelion: 23 September 2026
- Argument of perihelion: 145.860°

Physical characteristics
- Mean diameter: 3.599±0.214 km
- Geometric albedo: 0.054
- Spectral type: C
- Absolute magnitude (H): 15.53

(248370) 2005 QN_{173} is a main belt asteroid that undergoes recurrent comet-like activity near perihelion, and is now designated comet 433P/(248370) 2005 QN_{173}. This object was discovered on August 29, 2005 by the Near-Earth Asteroid Tracking program at Palomar Observatory. It orbits in the outer main asteroid belt with an orbital period of 5.36 years, a semi-major axis of 3.06 AU, and an orbital eccentricity of 0.225, bringing it as close as 2.37 AU to the Sun at perihelion. The orbital plane is inclined at an angle of 0.068° to the ecliptic.

On July 7, 2021, 2005 QN_{173} was found to be active by the Asteroid Terrestrial-impact Last Alert System survey. Archival imagery showed it had been active during a previous perihelion passage, dated July 22, 2016. This indicates the activity is due to the sublimation of icy volatiles, as is common with comets. At the time that activity was identified, the object displayed a long, dusty tail, much like a comet. Follow up observations found this tail extended more than 9′ along its orbital plane. By August 14, 2021, the coma around the nucleus was fading, while the brightness of the tail remained roughly constant.

This asteroid has a mean diameter of 3.6±0.2 km, with a low visual albedo of 0.054±0.012. Its colors are consistent with a taxonomic classification as a dark C-type carbonaceous asteroid, which is a class commonly found in the outer main belt. Dust particles ejected from the object had very low velocities of about 1 m/s. This suggests that the dust emission may have been assisted by rapid spin of the asteroid, which would lower the escape velocity.

The asteroid made perihelion passage on September 3, 2026. Comet-like activity was reported from June 10 onward, becoming the third time it has been observed making an active apparition.
