= (457175) 2008 GO98 =

Jupiter family comet

(457175) 2008 GO_{98} 362P/2008 GO_{98}
Discovery
- Discovered by: Spacewatch
- Discovery site: Kitt Peak National Obs.
- Discovery date: 8 April 2008

Designations
- Alternative designations: 362P
- Minor planet category: Jupiter family quasi-Hilda

Orbital characteristics
- Epoch 9 June 2026 (JD 2461200.5)
- Uncertainty parameter 0
- Observation arc: 24.02 yr (8,774 d)
- Aphelion: 5.0780 AU
- Perihelion: 2.8643 AU
- Semi-major axis: 3.9712 AU
- Eccentricity: 0.27872
- Orbital period (sidereal): 7.89 yr (2,883 d)
- Mean anomaly: 85.852°
- Mean motion: 0° 7^{m} 28.2^{s} / day
- Inclination: 15.560°
- Longitude of ascending node: 192.52°
- Time of perihelion: 14 June 2032
- Argument of perihelion: 53.365°
- Jupiter MOID: 0.3582 AU
- T_{Jupiter}: 2.927

Physical characteristics
- Mean diameter: 5.5–24.7 km (est.); 14.64 h (calculated)
- Synodic rotation period: 10.74±0.01 h (Note: Lightcurve plot of (457175) 2008 GO_{98}, by B. D Warner, at CS3 (2017). Rotation period 10.74±0.01 hours with a brightness amplitude of 0.12±0.02 mag. Quality Code is 2. Summary figures at the LCDB.)
- Geometric albedo: 0.057 (assumed)
- Spectral type: C (assumed)
- Absolute magnitude (H): 12.9; 15.1

(457175) 2008 GO_{98}, cometary number 362P, is a Jupiter-family comet in a quasi-Hilda orbit within the outermost regions of the asteroid belt. It was discovered on 8 April 2008, by astronomers of the Spacewatch program at Kitt Peak National Observatory near Tucson, Arizona, in the United States. This presumably carbonaceous body has a diameter of approximately 15 kilometers (9 miles) and rotation period of 10.7 hours.

== Orbit and classification ==
2008 GO_{98} is classified as a member of the dynamical Hilda group, as well as a Jupiter family comet that shows clear cometary activity, which has also been described as a "quasi-Hilda comet". Orbital backward integration suggests that it might have been a centaur or trans-Neptunian object that ended its dynamical evolution as a quasi-Hilda comet. It may have reached the belt during the last few hundred years.

It orbits the Sun in the outer asteroid belt at a distance of 2.9–5.1 AU once every 7 years and 11 months (2,883 days; semi-major axis of 3.96 AU). Its orbit has an eccentricity of 0.28 and an inclination of 16° with respect to the ecliptic. The body's observation arc begins with a precovery taken by the Sloan Digital Sky Survey in October 2001, more than 5 years prior to its official discovery observation by Spacewatch.

Although 2008 GO_{98} orbits in the asteroid belt, it has a Jupiter Tisserand's parameter (T_{J}) of 2.926, just below Jewitt's threshold of 3, which serves as a distinction between the main-belt asteroids (T_{J} larger than 3) and the Jupiter-family comets (T_{J} between 2 and 3).

== Numbering and naming ==
This minor planet was numbered by the Minor Planet Center on 16 February 2016 (M.P.C. 98587). As of 2020, it has not been named.

== Physical characteristics ==
2008 GO_{98} is an assumed C-type asteroid.

=== Rotation period ===
In August 2017, a rotational lightcurve of 2008 GO_{98} was obtained from photometric observations by American astronomer Brian Warner at the Palmer Divide Station (U82) in California. Lightcurve analysis gave a rotation period of 10.74±0.01 hours with a small brightness amplitude of 0.12 magnitude (U=2).

=== Diameter and albedo ===
The Collaborative Asteroid Lightcurve Link assumes a standard albedo for a carbonaceous body of 0.057 and calculates a diameter of 14.64 kilometers based on an absolute magnitude of 12.9. Other estimates, taking into account several published magnitude measurements and a large range of albedo assumptions, estimate a diameter range of 5.5 to 24.7 kilometers.
