= List of minor planets: 515001–516000 =

The following is a partial list of minor planets, running from minor-planet number 515001 through 516000, inclusive. The primary data for this and other partial lists is based on JPL's "Small-Body Orbital Elements" and data available from the Minor Planet Center. Critical list information is also provided by the MPC, unless otherwise specified from Lowell Observatory. A detailed description of the table's columns and additional sources are given on the main page including a complete list of every page in this series, and a statistical break-up on the dynamical classification of minor planets.

Also see the summary list of all named bodies in numerical and alphabetical order, and the corresponding naming citations for the number range of this particular list. New namings may only be added to this list after official publication, as the preannouncement of names is condemned by the Working Group for Small Bodies Nomenclature of the International Astronomical Union.

Near-Earth obj.	MBA (inner)	MBA (outer)	Centaur
Mars-crosser	MBA (middle)	Jupiter trojan	Trans-Neptunian obj.
Unclassified

== 515001–515100 ==
Designation			Discovery			Properties		Ref
Permanent	Provisional	Named after	Date	Site	Discoverer(s)	Category	Diam.	Ref
515001	2009 PL_{19}	—	August 15, 2009	Kitt Peak	Spacewatch	·	2.4 km	MPC · JPL
515002	2009 QS_{4}	—	July 28, 2009	Kitt Peak	Spacewatch	·	630 m	MPC · JPL
515003	2009 QH_{20}	—	August 19, 2009	La Sagra	OAM	·	820 m	MPC · JPL
515004	2009 QR_{31}	—	August 15, 2009	Kitt Peak	Spacewatch	T_{j} (2.99) · EUP	3.6 km	MPC · JPL
515005	2009 QA_{49}	—	August 28, 2009	La Sagra	OAM	NYS	830 m	MPC · JPL
515006	2009 QA_{57}	—	August 17, 2009	Kitt Peak	Spacewatch	·	2.5 km	MPC · JPL
515007	2009 QU_{65}	—	February 25, 2007	Mount Lemmon	Mount Lemmon Survey	·	2.0 km	MPC · JPL
515008	2009 QV_{65}	—	August 17, 2009	Kitt Peak	Spacewatch	·	2.5 km	MPC · JPL
515009	2009 RE_{33}	—	September 14, 2009	Kitt Peak	Spacewatch	·	650 m	MPC · JPL
515010	2009 SK_{2}	—	September 18, 2009	Mount Lemmon	Mount Lemmon Survey	APO	570 m	MPC · JPL
515011	2009 SF_{23}	—	September 16, 2009	Kitt Peak	Spacewatch	EOS	2.0 km	MPC · JPL
515012	2009 SK_{68}	—	August 17, 2009	Kitt Peak	Spacewatch	·	2.8 km	MPC · JPL
515013	2009 SN_{69}	—	September 17, 2009	Kitt Peak	Spacewatch	·	980 m	MPC · JPL
515014	2009 SP_{78}	—	April 1, 2008	Kitt Peak	Spacewatch	·	690 m	MPC · JPL
515015	2009 SQ_{112}	—	October 31, 2006	Kitt Peak	Spacewatch	·	650 m	MPC · JPL
515016	2009 SK_{117}	—	September 18, 2009	Kitt Peak	Spacewatch	·	2.5 km	MPC · JPL
515017	2009 SJ_{118}	—	March 14, 2007	Kitt Peak	Spacewatch	·	3.3 km	MPC · JPL
515018	2009 SB_{130}	—	September 18, 2009	Kitt Peak	Spacewatch	PHO	700 m	MPC · JPL
515019	2009 SC_{174}	—	August 17, 2009	Kitt Peak	Spacewatch	·	3.0 km	MPC · JPL
515020	2009 SD_{221}	—	August 18, 2009	Kitt Peak	Spacewatch	·	2.4 km	MPC · JPL
515021	2009 SL_{236}	—	August 20, 2009	Catalina	CSS	EUP	4.1 km	MPC · JPL
515022	2009 SU_{246}	—	August 19, 2009	Kitt Peak	Spacewatch	·	3.6 km	MPC · JPL
515023	2009 SY_{284}	—	August 27, 2009	Kitt Peak	Spacewatch	·	740 m	MPC · JPL
515024	2009 SK_{303}	—	August 27, 2009	Kitt Peak	Spacewatch	·	1.8 km	MPC · JPL
515025	2009 SP_{307}	—	September 17, 2009	Kitt Peak	Spacewatch	NYS	810 m	MPC · JPL
515026	2009 SH_{354}	—	September 19, 2009	Catalina	CSS	·	3.7 km	MPC · JPL
515027	2009 SW_{357}	—	September 28, 2009	Kitt Peak	Spacewatch	MAS	480 m	MPC · JPL
515028	2009 TW_{27}	—	October 15, 2009	La Sagra	OAM	·	1.6 km	MPC · JPL
515029	2009 UG_{129}	—	August 29, 2009	Kitt Peak	Spacewatch	·	2.6 km	MPC · JPL
515030	2009 UM_{130}	—	September 28, 2009	Catalina	CSS	·	1.4 km	MPC · JPL
515031	2009 VS_{30}	—	November 9, 2009	Mount Lemmon	Mount Lemmon Survey	·	3.6 km	MPC · JPL
515032	2009 VZ_{50}	—	October 22, 2009	Mount Lemmon	Mount Lemmon Survey	·	910 m	MPC · JPL
515033	2009 VF_{91}	—	September 20, 2009	Siding Spring	SSS	PHO	1.2 km	MPC · JPL
515034	2009 WT_{4}	—	November 16, 2009	Mount Lemmon	Mount Lemmon Survey	·	750 m	MPC · JPL
515035	2009 WE_{28}	—	September 19, 2009	Mount Lemmon	Mount Lemmon Survey	NYS	940 m	MPC · JPL
515036	2009 WB_{36}	—	November 17, 2009	Kitt Peak	Spacewatch	MAS	630 m	MPC · JPL
515037	2009 WE_{40}	—	November 17, 2009	Kitt Peak	Spacewatch	·	990 m	MPC · JPL
515038	2009 WF_{56}	—	October 23, 2009	Mount Lemmon	Mount Lemmon Survey	·	860 m	MPC · JPL
515039	2009 YW_{19}	—	December 25, 2009	Kitt Peak	Spacewatch	·	1.4 km	MPC · JPL
515040	2009 YB_{23}	—	December 20, 2009	Kitt Peak	Spacewatch	V	660 m	MPC · JPL
515041	2010 CU_{19}	—	February 11, 2010	WISE	WISE	T_{j} (2.77)	1.2 km	MPC · JPL
515042	2010 CU_{62}	—	January 21, 2002	Kitt Peak	Spacewatch	·	990 m	MPC · JPL
515043	2010 CW_{148}	—	December 26, 2005	Kitt Peak	Spacewatch	·	990 m	MPC · JPL
515044	2010 CM_{181}	—	February 16, 2010	Mount Lemmon	Mount Lemmon Survey	·	1.3 km	MPC · JPL
515045	2010 DB_{75}	—	February 17, 2010	Kitt Peak	Spacewatch	·	780 m	MPC · JPL
515046	2010 EA_{72}	—	March 13, 2010	Mount Lemmon	Mount Lemmon Survey	KON	2.0 km	MPC · JPL
515047	2010 EN_{83}	—	March 12, 2010	Catalina	CSS	H	530 m	MPC · JPL
515048	2010 EL_{129}	—	March 12, 2010	Kitt Peak	Spacewatch	HNS	1.1 km	MPC · JPL
515049	2010 FL	—	March 17, 2010	Catalina	CSS	APO	350 m	MPC · JPL
515050	2010 FT_{85}	—	March 25, 2010	Kitt Peak	Spacewatch	·	1.0 km	MPC · JPL
515051	2010 GA	—	April 1, 2010	WISE	WISE	·	2.0 km	MPC · JPL
515052	2010 GA_{99}	—	April 20, 2006	Kitt Peak	Spacewatch	·	760 m	MPC · JPL
515053	2010 GZ_{101}	—	April 5, 2010	Kitt Peak	Spacewatch	·	1.4 km	MPC · JPL
515054	2010 GM_{140}	—	April 8, 2010	Kitt Peak	Spacewatch	H	460 m	MPC · JPL
515055	2010 JA_{31}	—	May 4, 2010	Catalina	CSS	·	1.1 km	MPC · JPL
515056	2010 JQ_{43}	—	May 4, 2010	Kitt Peak	Spacewatch	·	1.2 km	MPC · JPL
515057	2010 JU_{115}	—	April 25, 2010	Mount Lemmon	Mount Lemmon Survey	JUN	930 m	MPC · JPL
515058	2010 JY_{175}	—	May 14, 2010	Nogales	P. R. Holvorcem, M. Schwartz	·	1.5 km	MPC · JPL
515059	2010 LQ_{20}	—	December 3, 2008	Mount Lemmon	Mount Lemmon Survey	KRM	2.3 km	MPC · JPL
515060	2010 LO_{55}	—	June 9, 2010	WISE	WISE	·	4.0 km	MPC · JPL
515061	2010 LM_{71}	—	June 10, 2010	WISE	WISE	·	3.8 km	MPC · JPL
515062	2010 LV_{72}	—	June 10, 2010	WISE	WISE	·	3.4 km	MPC · JPL
515063	2010 MO_{61}	—	June 24, 2010	WISE	WISE	·	2.2 km	MPC · JPL
515064	2010 MO_{62}	—	June 24, 2010	WISE	WISE	·	2.3 km	MPC · JPL
515065	2010 MT_{64}	—	January 8, 2007	Mount Lemmon	Mount Lemmon Survey	NAE	3.3 km	MPC · JPL
515066	2010 MG_{72}	—	April 18, 2009	Mount Lemmon	Mount Lemmon Survey	·	2.0 km	MPC · JPL
515067	2010 NH_{60}	—	July 11, 2010	WISE	WISE	·	3.1 km	MPC · JPL
515068	2010 NO_{113}	—	July 13, 2010	WISE	WISE	·	3.3 km	MPC · JPL
515069	2010 OG_{32}	—	July 20, 2010	WISE	WISE	·	2.1 km	MPC · JPL
515070	2010 OA_{34}	—	November 25, 2005	Catalina	CSS	·	4.3 km	MPC · JPL
515071	2010 OU_{34}	—	July 20, 2010	WISE	WISE	·	3.5 km	MPC · JPL
515072	2010 OF_{58}	—	July 23, 2010	WISE	WISE	·	2.6 km	MPC · JPL
515073	2010 OL_{111}	—	July 29, 2010	WISE	WISE	·	3.0 km	MPC · JPL
515074	2010 PX_{64}	—	August 10, 2010	Kitt Peak	Spacewatch	KOR	1.3 km	MPC · JPL
515075	2010 PZ_{67}	—	August 9, 2010	WISE	WISE	·	4.4 km	MPC · JPL
515076	2010 RY_{85}	—	August 12, 2010	Kitt Peak	Spacewatch	EOS	1.4 km	MPC · JPL
515077	2010 RQ_{148}	—	September 15, 2010	Kitt Peak	Spacewatch	·	2.0 km	MPC · JPL
515078	2010 RE_{155}	—	February 12, 2008	Mount Lemmon	Mount Lemmon Survey	·	2.6 km	MPC · JPL
515079	2010 SF_{4}	—	September 16, 2010	Kitt Peak	Spacewatch	·	2.5 km	MPC · JPL
515080	2010 SN_{12}	—	November 3, 2005	Catalina	CSS	·	2.7 km	MPC · JPL
515081	2010 SZ_{43}	—	September 29, 2010	Mount Lemmon	Mount Lemmon Survey	·	3.2 km	MPC · JPL
515082	2010 TM_{3}	—	October 25, 1981	Palomar	S. J. Bus	AMO · fast?	260 m	MPC · JPL
515083	2010 TS_{32}	—	April 6, 2008	Kitt Peak	Spacewatch	EOS	1.5 km	MPC · JPL
515084	2010 TX_{98}	—	September 23, 2005	Kitt Peak	Spacewatch	·	1.8 km	MPC · JPL
515085	2010 TO_{115}	—	October 22, 2005	Kitt Peak	Spacewatch	·	2.4 km	MPC · JPL
515086	2010 TS_{155}	—	September 16, 2010	Kitt Peak	Spacewatch	EOS	1.4 km	MPC · JPL
515087	2010 TN_{165}	—	September 17, 2010	Mount Lemmon	Mount Lemmon Survey	·	2.0 km	MPC · JPL
515088	2010 TN_{193}	—	May 1, 2008	Kitt Peak	Spacewatch	·	2.0 km	MPC · JPL
515089	2010 UT_{4}	—	September 16, 2010	Mount Lemmon	Mount Lemmon Survey	·	660 m	MPC · JPL
515090	2010 UH_{43}	—	November 19, 2007	Kitt Peak	Spacewatch	·	520 m	MPC · JPL
515091	2010 UV_{56}	—	October 29, 2010	Kitt Peak	Spacewatch	THB	2.9 km	MPC · JPL
515092	2010 US_{69}	—	October 28, 2010	Catalina	CSS	·	640 m	MPC · JPL
515093	2010 UP_{79}	—	October 30, 2010	Mount Lemmon	Mount Lemmon Survey	URS	3.8 km	MPC · JPL
515094	2010 UT_{108}	—	October 17, 2010	Mount Lemmon	Mount Lemmon Survey	·	2.4 km	MPC · JPL
515095	2010 VZ_{25}	—	October 14, 2010	Mount Lemmon	Mount Lemmon Survey	·	2.0 km	MPC · JPL
515096	2010 VX_{61}	—	November 5, 2010	Mount Lemmon	Mount Lemmon Survey	EOS	2.0 km	MPC · JPL
515097	2010 VY_{87}	—	October 14, 2010	Mount Lemmon	Mount Lemmon Survey	·	2.9 km	MPC · JPL
515098	2010 VW_{99}	—	September 16, 2010	Mount Lemmon	Mount Lemmon Survey	·	2.5 km	MPC · JPL
515099	2010 VT_{140}	—	October 27, 2005	Kitt Peak	Spacewatch	·	1.9 km	MPC · JPL
515100	2010 VD_{153}	—	October 30, 2010	Mount Lemmon	Mount Lemmon Survey	·	2.5 km	MPC · JPL

== 515101–515200 ==
back to top

Designation			Discovery			Properties		Ref
Permanent	Provisional	Named after	Date	Site	Discoverer(s)	Category	Diam.	Ref
515101	2010 VQ_{161}	—	September 5, 2010	Mount Lemmon	Mount Lemmon Survey	EOS	1.6 km	MPC · JPL
515102	2010 VU_{163}	—	November 1, 2010	Kitt Peak	Spacewatch	·	3.8 km	MPC · JPL
515103	2010 VR_{178}	—	October 14, 2010	Mount Lemmon	Mount Lemmon Survey	VER	2.8 km	MPC · JPL
515104	2010 VW_{208}	—	November 3, 2005	Mount Lemmon	Mount Lemmon Survey	EOS	1.7 km	MPC · JPL
515105	2010 VD_{209}	—	September 16, 2010	Mount Lemmon	Mount Lemmon Survey	·	2.6 km	MPC · JPL
515106	2010 VQ_{209}	—	October 28, 2010	Mount Lemmon	Mount Lemmon Survey	·	2.5 km	MPC · JPL
515107	2010 WJ_{11}	—	April 14, 2007	Mount Lemmon	Mount Lemmon Survey	EOS	1.7 km	MPC · JPL
515108	2010 WS_{33}	—	November 27, 2010	Mount Lemmon	Mount Lemmon Survey	·	3.1 km	MPC · JPL
515109	2010 WV_{61}	—	November 27, 2010	Mount Lemmon	Mount Lemmon Survey	THM	2.3 km	MPC · JPL
515110	2010 XR_{14}	—	October 17, 2010	Catalina	CSS	·	2.5 km	MPC · JPL
515111	2010 XH_{73}	—	January 12, 2008	Kitt Peak	Spacewatch	·	540 m	MPC · JPL
515112	2011 AS_{27}	—	January 9, 2011	Kitt Peak	Spacewatch	·	550 m	MPC · JPL
515113	2011 BW_{88}	—	April 6, 2008	Kitt Peak	Spacewatch	·	470 m	MPC · JPL
515114	2011 BZ_{135}	—	February 10, 2008	Kitt Peak	Spacewatch	·	490 m	MPC · JPL
515115	2011 CS_{79}	—	September 30, 2006	Mount Lemmon	Mount Lemmon Survey	·	500 m	MPC · JPL
515116	2011 CH_{91}	—	February 12, 2011	Mount Lemmon	Mount Lemmon Survey	·	690 m	MPC · JPL
515117	2011 DH_{38}	—	February 25, 2011	Mount Lemmon	Mount Lemmon Survey	·	680 m	MPC · JPL
515118	2011 DX_{48}	—	February 17, 2004	Kitt Peak	Spacewatch	·	690 m	MPC · JPL
515119	2011 EK_{37}	—	February 26, 2011	Kitt Peak	Spacewatch	·	800 m	MPC · JPL
515120	2011 EZ_{51}	—	May 7, 2008	Mount Lemmon	Mount Lemmon Survey	·	690 m	MPC · JPL
515121	2011 EX_{67}	—	March 17, 2004	Kitt Peak	Spacewatch	·	710 m	MPC · JPL
515122	2011 EF_{70}	—	November 16, 2006	Kitt Peak	Spacewatch	·	550 m	MPC · JPL
515123	2011 EW_{70}	—	September 16, 2009	Mount Lemmon	Mount Lemmon Survey	·	600 m	MPC · JPL
515124	2011 EE_{85}	—	September 21, 2009	Mount Lemmon	Mount Lemmon Survey	·	810 m	MPC · JPL
515125	2011 FX_{5}	—	August 18, 2009	Siding Spring	SSS	PHO	910 m	MPC · JPL
515126	2011 FN_{13}	—	August 4, 2008	La Sagra	OAM	·	760 m	MPC · JPL
515127	2011 FQ_{13}	—	March 27, 2011	Kitt Peak	Spacewatch	·	650 m	MPC · JPL
515128	2011 FR_{13}	—	February 25, 2011	Mount Lemmon	Mount Lemmon Survey	·	800 m	MPC · JPL
515129	2011 FS_{17}	—	July 3, 2005	Mount Lemmon	Mount Lemmon Survey	·	1.0 km	MPC · JPL
515130	2011 FN_{32}	—	March 14, 2011	Kitt Peak	Spacewatch	·	620 m	MPC · JPL
515131	2011 FO_{82}	—	September 19, 2001	Socorro	LINEAR	·	940 m	MPC · JPL
515132	2011 FU_{87}	—	February 22, 2011	Kitt Peak	Spacewatch	·	720 m	MPC · JPL
515133	2011 FD_{91}	—	March 10, 2011	Kitt Peak	Spacewatch	NYS	800 m	MPC · JPL
515134	2011 GP_{12}	—	September 6, 2008	Mount Lemmon	Mount Lemmon Survey	NYS	810 m	MPC · JPL
515135	2011 GY_{48}	—	April 13, 2004	Kitt Peak	Spacewatch	·	550 m	MPC · JPL
515136	2011 GB_{62}	—	March 10, 2011	Črni Vrh	Skvarč, J.	·	850 m	MPC · JPL
515137	2011 GL_{70}	—	March 28, 2011	Kitt Peak	Spacewatch	PHO	790 m	MPC · JPL
515138	2011 HZ	—	February 14, 2010	WISE	WISE	PHO	880 m	MPC · JPL
515139	2011 HX_{13}	—	March 31, 2011	Kitt Peak	Spacewatch	·	880 m	MPC · JPL
515140	2011 HT_{25}	—	April 6, 2011	Mount Lemmon	Mount Lemmon Survey	·	920 m	MPC · JPL
515141	2011 HG_{39}	—	April 27, 2011	Kitt Peak	Spacewatch	·	1.0 km	MPC · JPL
515142	2011 HO_{43}	—	March 25, 2011	Kitt Peak	Spacewatch	·	910 m	MPC · JPL
515143	2011 HZ_{72}	—	March 27, 2004	Kitt Peak	Spacewatch	·	630 m	MPC · JPL
515144	2011 HN_{77}	—	April 26, 2011	Kitt Peak	Spacewatch	·	820 m	MPC · JPL
515145	2011 HK_{84}	—	April 13, 2011	Mount Lemmon	Mount Lemmon Survey	NYS	930 m	MPC · JPL
515146	2011 HO_{100}	—	April 30, 2011	Kitt Peak	Spacewatch	·	770 m	MPC · JPL
515147	2011 JU_{12}	—	April 5, 2010	WISE	WISE	PHO	2.8 km	MPC · JPL
515148	2011 JH_{17}	—	April 13, 2011	Mount Lemmon	Mount Lemmon Survey	·	850 m	MPC · JPL
515149	2011 KK_{21}	—	January 30, 2011	Haleakala	Pan-STARRS 1	V	860 m	MPC · JPL
515150	2011 KP_{27}	—	March 13, 2007	Mount Lemmon	Mount Lemmon Survey	NYS	850 m	MPC · JPL
515151	2011 KJ_{33}	—	May 22, 2011	Mount Lemmon	Mount Lemmon Survey	·	1.1 km	MPC · JPL
515152	2011 LV_{9}	—	May 26, 2011	Kitt Peak	Spacewatch	·	1.1 km	MPC · JPL
515153	2011 LR_{20}	—	June 12, 2011	Haleakala	Pan-STARRS 1	·	1.5 km	MPC · JPL
515154	2011 MC_{4}	—	June 26, 2011	Mount Lemmon	Mount Lemmon Survey	·	1.2 km	MPC · JPL
515155	2011 MK_{11}	—	June 27, 2011	Kitt Peak	Spacewatch	L5	8.5 km	MPC · JPL
515156	2011 OY_{7}	—	July 26, 2011	Haleakala	Pan-STARRS 1	MAS	750 m	MPC · JPL
515157	2011 OH_{9}	—	July 24, 2011	Haleakala	Pan-STARRS 1	KON	2.1 km	MPC · JPL
515158	2011 PK_{13}	—	July 27, 2011	Haleakala	Pan-STARRS 1	·	1.5 km	MPC · JPL
515159	2011 PA_{14}	—	August 10, 2011	Haleakala	Pan-STARRS 1	·	1.8 km	MPC · JPL
515160	2011 PC_{16}	—	August 10, 2011	Haleakala	Pan-STARRS 1	·	2.9 km	MPC · JPL
515161	2011 QO_{12}	—	August 23, 2011	Socorro	LINEAR	H	430 m	MPC · JPL
515162	2011 QH_{28}	—	August 22, 2011	La Sagra	OAM	H	460 m	MPC · JPL
515163	2011 QN_{33}	—	September 6, 2002	Socorro	LINEAR	·	2.3 km	MPC · JPL
515164	2011 QO_{38}	—	September 21, 2007	XuYi	PMO NEO Survey Program	·	1.8 km	MPC · JPL
515165	2011 QX_{41}	—	July 27, 2011	Haleakala	Pan-STARRS 1	·	1.4 km	MPC · JPL
515166	2011 QV_{45}	—	August 29, 2011	Haleakala	Pan-STARRS 1	H	360 m	MPC · JPL
515167	2011 QJ_{66}	—	August 25, 2011	La Sagra	OAM	·	1.1 km	MPC · JPL
515168	2011 QW_{99}	—	August 30, 2011	Haleakala	Pan-STARRS 1	DOR	2.1 km	MPC · JPL
515169	2011 RK_{1}	—	October 11, 2007	Kitt Peak	Spacewatch	·	1.1 km	MPC · JPL
515170	2011 SA_{43}	—	September 18, 2011	Mount Lemmon	Mount Lemmon Survey	·	1.5 km	MPC · JPL
515171	2011 SY_{54}	—	September 23, 2011	Haleakala	Pan-STARRS 1	(12739)	1.5 km	MPC · JPL
515172	2011 SE_{56}	—	December 6, 2007	Kitt Peak	Spacewatch	·	1.7 km	MPC · JPL
515173	2011 SE_{67}	—	July 9, 2011	Haleakala	Pan-STARRS 1	·	1.9 km	MPC · JPL
515174	2011 SU_{94}	—	September 24, 2011	Mount Lemmon	Mount Lemmon Survey	·	1.4 km	MPC · JPL
515175	2011 SD_{120}	—	September 4, 2011	Haleakala	Pan-STARRS 1	·	2.0 km	MPC · JPL
515176	2011 SA_{141}	—	September 23, 2011	Haleakala	Pan-STARRS 1	EUN	1.4 km	MPC · JPL
515177	2011 SB_{179}	—	September 22, 2011	Kitt Peak	Spacewatch	·	1.7 km	MPC · JPL
515178	2011 SU_{241}	—	September 8, 2011	Kitt Peak	Spacewatch	·	1.5 km	MPC · JPL
515179	2011 SN_{249}	—	September 24, 2011	Haleakala	Pan-STARRS 1	·	2.0 km	MPC · JPL
515180	2011 SL_{278}	—	September 22, 2011	Kitt Peak	Spacewatch	EUN	1.1 km	MPC · JPL
515181	2011 TB_{15}	—	August 28, 2011	Siding Spring	SSS	·	2.5 km	MPC · JPL
515182	2011 TL_{17}	—	June 9, 2011	Mount Lemmon	Mount Lemmon Survey	·	2.1 km	MPC · JPL
515183	2011 UJ_{66}	—	October 20, 2011	Mount Lemmon	Mount Lemmon Survey	GEF	1.2 km	MPC · JPL
515184	2011 UM_{69}	—	September 29, 2011	Mount Lemmon	Mount Lemmon Survey	GEF	1.1 km	MPC · JPL
515185	2011 UZ_{78}	—	October 19, 2011	Kitt Peak	Spacewatch	WIT	880 m	MPC · JPL
515186	2011 UZ_{93}	—	October 18, 2011	Mount Lemmon	Mount Lemmon Survey	·	1.7 km	MPC · JPL
515187	2011 UC_{95}	—	October 19, 2011	Mount Lemmon	Mount Lemmon Survey	ADE	1.9 km	MPC · JPL
515188	2011 UH_{103}	—	October 20, 2011	Mount Lemmon	Mount Lemmon Survey	·	1.5 km	MPC · JPL
515189	2011 UW_{167}	—	October 18, 2011	Kitt Peak	Spacewatch	·	1.8 km	MPC · JPL
515190	2011 UW_{168}	—	March 12, 2010	Kitt Peak	Spacewatch	H	460 m	MPC · JPL
515191	2011 UK_{198}	—	October 25, 2011	Kitt Peak	Spacewatch	·	1.8 km	MPC · JPL
515192	2011 UZ_{223}	—	October 24, 2011	Mount Lemmon	Mount Lemmon Survey	·	1.6 km	MPC · JPL
515193	2011 UA_{226}	—	September 23, 2011	Haleakala	Pan-STARRS 1	·	1.5 km	MPC · JPL
515194	2011 UL_{246}	—	September 27, 2011	Mount Lemmon	Mount Lemmon Survey	H	470 m	MPC · JPL
515195	2011 UX_{248}	—	October 26, 2011	Haleakala	Pan-STARRS 1	(16286)	1.6 km	MPC · JPL
515196	2011 UB_{319}	—	October 30, 2011	Mount Lemmon	Mount Lemmon Survey	GEF	1.2 km	MPC · JPL
515197	2011 UH_{330}	—	May 8, 2005	Kitt Peak	Spacewatch	WIT	1.1 km	MPC · JPL
515198	2011 UT_{355}	—	September 28, 2011	Kitt Peak	Spacewatch	·	1.7 km	MPC · JPL
515199	2011 UC_{362}	—	August 4, 2011	Haleakala	Pan-STARRS 1	·	1.4 km	MPC · JPL
515200	2011 UH_{414}	—	October 24, 2011	Kitt Peak	Spacewatch	·	1.8 km	MPC · JPL

== 515201–515300 ==
back to top

Designation			Discovery			Properties		Ref
Permanent	Provisional	Named after	Date	Site	Discoverer(s)	Category	Diam.	Ref
515201	2011 UO_{414}	—	November 13, 2007	Mount Lemmon	Mount Lemmon Survey	·	1.9 km	MPC · JPL
515202	2011 UV_{414}	—	February 9, 2008	Mount Lemmon	Mount Lemmon Survey	·	2.0 km	MPC · JPL
515203	2011 VJ_{2}	—	October 19, 2011	Kitt Peak	Spacewatch	H	550 m	MPC · JPL
515204	2011 WB_{26}	—	November 3, 2011	Kitt Peak	Spacewatch	KOR	1.0 km	MPC · JPL
515205	2011 WD_{56}	—	January 13, 2008	Kitt Peak	Spacewatch	·	1.5 km	MPC · JPL
515206	2011 WZ_{59}	—	October 26, 2011	Haleakala	Pan-STARRS 1	·	1.8 km	MPC · JPL
515207	2011 WG_{64}	—	November 24, 2011	Mount Lemmon	Mount Lemmon Survey	·	1.5 km	MPC · JPL
515208	2011 WY_{64}	—	January 17, 2007	Kitt Peak	Spacewatch	·	1.5 km	MPC · JPL
515209	2011 WX_{87}	—	November 16, 2011	Kitt Peak	Spacewatch	·	2.5 km	MPC · JPL
515210	2011 WX_{102}	—	October 25, 2011	Haleakala	Pan-STARRS 1	·	2.0 km	MPC · JPL
515211	2011 WB_{129}	—	December 21, 2006	Kitt Peak	Spacewatch	·	1.2 km	MPC · JPL
515212	2011 YR_{27}	—	October 30, 2010	Mount Lemmon	Mount Lemmon Survey	·	2.4 km	MPC · JPL
515213	2011 YQ_{34}	—	November 28, 2011	Mount Lemmon	Mount Lemmon Survey	·	2.5 km	MPC · JPL
515214	2011 YJ_{43}	—	October 23, 2006	Mount Lemmon	Mount Lemmon Survey	·	1.8 km	MPC · JPL
515215	2012 AV_{8}	—	June 21, 2010	WISE	WISE	·	2.9 km	MPC · JPL
515216	2012 AT_{17}	—	October 11, 2010	Mount Lemmon	Mount Lemmon Survey	·	2.7 km	MPC · JPL
515217	2012 BL_{4}	—	December 3, 2010	Mount Lemmon	Mount Lemmon Survey	EOS	2.2 km	MPC · JPL
515218	2012 BF_{9}	—	August 25, 2009	La Sagra	OAM	EOS	2.4 km	MPC · JPL
515219	2012 BN_{23}	—	September 24, 2005	Kitt Peak	Spacewatch	·	2.2 km	MPC · JPL
515220	2012 BB_{38}	—	January 19, 2012	Mount Lemmon	Mount Lemmon Survey	·	2.7 km	MPC · JPL
515221	2012 BW_{40}	—	November 3, 2005	Mount Lemmon	Mount Lemmon Survey	·	2.4 km	MPC · JPL
515222	2012 BM_{50}	—	August 6, 2010	WISE	WISE	·	4.2 km	MPC · JPL
515223	2012 BC_{65}	—	December 27, 2011	Kitt Peak	Spacewatch	EOS	1.7 km	MPC · JPL
515224	2012 BK_{70}	—	November 16, 2010	Mount Lemmon	Mount Lemmon Survey	EOS	2.1 km	MPC · JPL
515225	2012 BD_{74}	—	December 27, 2011	Catalina	CSS	T_{j} (2.88)	2.9 km	MPC · JPL
515226	2012 BY_{74}	—	October 25, 2005	Kitt Peak	Spacewatch	·	1.9 km	MPC · JPL
515227	2012 BP_{80}	—	February 17, 2007	Kitt Peak	Spacewatch	·	1.6 km	MPC · JPL
515228	2012 BH_{94}	—	January 25, 2006	Catalina	CSS	·	3.3 km	MPC · JPL
515229	2012 BW_{96}	—	December 27, 2011	Kitt Peak	Spacewatch	H	580 m	MPC · JPL
515230	2012 BZ_{99}	—	January 27, 2012	Kitt Peak	Spacewatch	·	2.8 km	MPC · JPL
515231	2012 BS_{101}	—	January 19, 2012	Kitt Peak	Spacewatch	THM	1.8 km	MPC · JPL
515232	2012 BH_{106}	—	December 28, 2005	Kitt Peak	Spacewatch	·	2.6 km	MPC · JPL
515233	2012 BU_{106}	—	January 14, 2012	Kitt Peak	Spacewatch	THB	2.2 km	MPC · JPL
515234	2012 BA_{115}	—	January 27, 2012	Mount Lemmon	Mount Lemmon Survey	·	2.9 km	MPC · JPL
515235	2012 BE_{121}	—	January 19, 2012	Haleakala	Pan-STARRS 1	VER	2.3 km	MPC · JPL
515236	2012 BC_{137}	—	January 26, 2012	Mount Lemmon	Mount Lemmon Survey	THM	1.9 km	MPC · JPL
515237	2012 BE_{142}	—	January 23, 2012	Catalina	CSS	H	750 m	MPC · JPL
515238	2012 BP_{156}	—	March 14, 2007	Mount Lemmon	Mount Lemmon Survey	·	2.6 km	MPC · JPL
515239	2012 BT_{156}	—	April 23, 2007	Kitt Peak	Spacewatch	·	3.1 km	MPC · JPL
515240	2012 CQ_{7}	—	December 28, 2005	Kitt Peak	Spacewatch	·	3.3 km	MPC · JPL
515241	2012 CR_{11}	—	January 4, 2006	Kitt Peak	Spacewatch	·	2.4 km	MPC · JPL
515242	2012 CQ_{16}	—	December 8, 2005	Kitt Peak	Spacewatch	·	2.2 km	MPC · JPL
515243	2012 CV_{17}	—	January 27, 2012	Kitt Peak	Spacewatch	·	2.6 km	MPC · JPL
515244	2012 CY_{22}	—	January 29, 2012	Kitt Peak	Spacewatch	·	2.9 km	MPC · JPL
515245	2012 CK_{27}	—	January 18, 2012	Kitt Peak	Spacewatch	·	2.3 km	MPC · JPL
515246	2012 CN_{33}	—	February 14, 2012	Haleakala	Pan-STARRS 1	·	3.1 km	MPC · JPL
515247	2012 CV_{37}	—	January 20, 2012	Kitt Peak	Spacewatch	TIR	2.7 km	MPC · JPL
515248	2012 CB_{47}	—	January 19, 2012	Haleakala	Pan-STARRS 1	·	2.9 km	MPC · JPL
515249	2012 CF_{51}	—	January 19, 2012	Haleakala	Pan-STARRS 1	(7605)	3.1 km	MPC · JPL
515250	2012 CS_{52}	—	September 25, 2009	Kitt Peak	Spacewatch	·	2.7 km	MPC · JPL
515251	2012 DW_{63}	—	January 4, 2012	Mount Lemmon	Mount Lemmon Survey	·	2.8 km	MPC · JPL
515252	2012 DZ_{70}	—	February 1, 2006	Mount Lemmon	Mount Lemmon Survey	·	3.2 km	MPC · JPL
515253	2012 DB_{83}	—	January 19, 2012	Haleakala	Pan-STARRS 1	·	2.7 km	MPC · JPL
515254	2012 DW_{96}	—	January 26, 2012	Mount Lemmon	Mount Lemmon Survey	T_{j} (2.99)	3.4 km	MPC · JPL
515255	2012 EA_{11}	—	February 21, 2012	Kitt Peak	Spacewatch	HYG	2.7 km	MPC · JPL
515256	2012 FB_{82}	—	March 15, 2012	Mount Lemmon	Mount Lemmon Survey	·	3.2 km	MPC · JPL
515257	2012 JS_{19}	—	May 1, 2012	Mount Lemmon	Mount Lemmon Survey	·	840 m	MPC · JPL
515258	2012 PF_{3}	—	October 26, 2005	Kitt Peak	Spacewatch	·	900 m	MPC · JPL
515259	2012 PK_{42}	—	April 12, 2010	Mount Lemmon	Mount Lemmon Survey	3:2	4.7 km	MPC · JPL
515260	2012 QM_{52}	—	January 8, 2010	WISE	WISE	3:2 · SHU	5.9 km	MPC · JPL
515261	2012 RC_{4}	—	July 18, 2012	Catalina	CSS	·	1.7 km	MPC · JPL
515262	2012 RH_{16}	—	August 11, 2012	Siding Spring	SSS	·	850 m	MPC · JPL
515263	2012 RR_{22}	—	October 9, 1999	Socorro	LINEAR	·	1.2 km	MPC · JPL
515264	2012 RC_{30}	—	August 25, 2012	Haleakala	Pan-STARRS 1	·	1.1 km	MPC · JPL
515265	2012 RJ_{40}	—	August 26, 2012	Catalina	CSS	·	1.9 km	MPC · JPL
515266	2012 SJ_{3}	—	September 17, 2012	Kitt Peak	Spacewatch	·	1.1 km	MPC · JPL
515267	2012 SA_{15}	—	September 17, 2012	Kitt Peak	Spacewatch	EUN	1.0 km	MPC · JPL
515268	2012 SS_{30}	—	September 12, 2012	La Sagra	OAM	·	900 m	MPC · JPL
515269	2012 SP_{40}	—	May 3, 2008	Kitt Peak	Spacewatch	·	660 m	MPC · JPL
515270	2012 SD_{68}	—	April 29, 2011	Mount Lemmon	Mount Lemmon Survey	·	910 m	MPC · JPL
515271	2012 TX_{18}	—	December 3, 2008	Catalina	CSS	·	1.4 km	MPC · JPL
515272	2012 TR_{26}	—	October 22, 1995	Kitt Peak	Spacewatch	·	840 m	MPC · JPL
515273	2012 TA_{55}	—	October 6, 2012	Kitt Peak	Spacewatch	·	1.3 km	MPC · JPL
515274	2012 TQ_{55}	—	September 15, 2012	Kitt Peak	Spacewatch	·	1.0 km	MPC · JPL
515275	2012 TK_{95}	—	March 14, 2011	Mount Lemmon	Mount Lemmon Survey	V	580 m	MPC · JPL
515276	2012 TM_{103}	—	September 28, 1997	Kitt Peak	Spacewatch	·	1.1 km	MPC · JPL
515277	2012 TV_{103}	—	April 15, 2007	Mount Lemmon	Mount Lemmon Survey	·	1.2 km	MPC · JPL
515278	2012 TJ_{145}	—	November 3, 2008	Kitt Peak	Spacewatch	·	1.2 km	MPC · JPL
515279	2012 TO_{153}	—	October 8, 2012	Haleakala	Pan-STARRS 1	·	870 m	MPC · JPL
515280	2012 TY_{158}	—	October 6, 2008	Mount Lemmon	Mount Lemmon Survey	(5)	1.0 km	MPC · JPL
515281	2012 TV_{169}	—	October 8, 2012	Haleakala	Pan-STARRS 1	·	1.0 km	MPC · JPL
515282	2012 TC_{191}	—	August 28, 2005	Kitt Peak	Spacewatch	·	610 m	MPC · JPL
515283	2012 TV_{193}	—	March 4, 2005	Kitt Peak	Spacewatch	·	1.2 km	MPC · JPL
515284	2012 TZ_{202}	—	October 5, 2012	Haleakala	Pan-STARRS 1	V	740 m	MPC · JPL
515285	2012 TL_{223}	—	April 30, 2011	Haleakala	Pan-STARRS 1	·	1.3 km	MPC · JPL
515286	2012 TO_{225}	—	October 8, 2012	Mount Lemmon	Mount Lemmon Survey	·	730 m	MPC · JPL
515287	2012 TR_{227}	—	October 8, 2005	Kitt Peak	Spacewatch	·	600 m	MPC · JPL
515288	2012 TM_{232}	—	July 30, 2008	Kitt Peak	Spacewatch	·	1.2 km	MPC · JPL
515289	2012 TD_{237}	—	January 8, 2010	Mount Lemmon	Mount Lemmon Survey	·	1.2 km	MPC · JPL
515290	2012 TM_{242}	—	October 8, 2012	Haleakala	Pan-STARRS 1	·	1.2 km	MPC · JPL
515291	2012 TO_{275}	—	August 21, 2008	Kitt Peak	Spacewatch	·	1.2 km	MPC · JPL
515292	2012 TC_{304}	—	September 17, 2012	Catalina	CSS	·	1.6 km	MPC · JPL
515293	2012 TS_{305}	—	September 15, 2012	Kitt Peak	Spacewatch	SUL	1.8 km	MPC · JPL
515294	2012 TT_{312}	—	October 28, 2005	Kitt Peak	Spacewatch	·	920 m	MPC · JPL
515295	2012 TW_{326}	—	August 6, 2008	Siding Spring	SSS	V	840 m	MPC · JPL
515296	2012 UB_{39}	—	September 19, 2012	Mount Lemmon	Mount Lemmon Survey	·	1.2 km	MPC · JPL
515297	2012 UP_{41}	—	September 22, 2008	Mount Lemmon	Mount Lemmon Survey	(5)	880 m	MPC · JPL
515298	2012 UA_{51}	—	October 18, 2012	Haleakala	Pan-STARRS 1	·	1.1 km	MPC · JPL
515299	2012 US_{61}	—	August 27, 2012	Siding Spring	SSS	·	1.6 km	MPC · JPL
515300	2012 UA_{84}	—	October 10, 2012	Mount Lemmon	Mount Lemmon Survey	·	1.5 km	MPC · JPL

== 515301–515400 ==
back to top

Designation			Discovery			Properties		Ref
Permanent	Provisional	Named after	Date	Site	Discoverer(s)	Category	Diam.	Ref
515301	2012 UV_{87}	—	October 28, 2008	Kitt Peak	Spacewatch	·	1.0 km	MPC · JPL
515302	2012 UC_{119}	—	October 9, 2012	Mount Lemmon	Mount Lemmon Survey	·	1.2 km	MPC · JPL
515303	2012 UT_{132}	—	October 17, 2012	Mount Lemmon	Mount Lemmon Survey	(5)	1.1 km	MPC · JPL
515304	2012 UK_{133}	—	March 31, 2011	Haleakala	Pan-STARRS 1	·	970 m	MPC · JPL
515305	2012 VK_{1}	—	October 26, 2012	Mount Lemmon	Mount Lemmon Survey	·	930 m	MPC · JPL
515306	2012 VD_{22}	—	October 27, 2008	Kitt Peak	Spacewatch	·	770 m	MPC · JPL
515307	2012 VQ_{26}	—	October 1, 2005	Mount Lemmon	Mount Lemmon Survey	·	670 m	MPC · JPL
515308	2012 VS_{52}	—	October 21, 2012	Haleakala	Pan-STARRS 1	·	1.1 km	MPC · JPL
515309	2012 VL_{58}	—	October 21, 2012	Haleakala	Pan-STARRS 1	·	1.1 km	MPC · JPL
515310	2012 VX_{83}	—	October 21, 2012	Haleakala	Pan-STARRS 1	·	1.5 km	MPC · JPL
515311	2012 VO_{105}	—	October 26, 2012	Haleakala	Pan-STARRS 1	·	1.6 km	MPC · JPL
515312	2012 WP_{5}	—	November 17, 2012	Kitt Peak	Spacewatch	·	1 km	MPC · JPL
515313	2012 WN_{34}	—	November 26, 2012	Mount Lemmon	Mount Lemmon Survey	·	1.7 km	MPC · JPL
515314	2012 XL_{5}	—	November 14, 2012	Mount Lemmon	Mount Lemmon Survey	(5)	1.1 km	MPC · JPL
515315	2012 XQ_{6}	—	April 27, 2009	Catalina	CSS	·	2.1 km	MPC · JPL
515316	2012 XM_{7}	—	December 1, 2008	Mount Lemmon	Mount Lemmon Survey	·	1.3 km	MPC · JPL
515317	2012 XQ_{15}	—	September 19, 2003	Kitt Peak	Spacewatch	·	1.5 km	MPC · JPL
515318	2012 XW_{15}	—	December 5, 2012	Mount Lemmon	Mount Lemmon Survey	·	1.9 km	MPC · JPL
515319	2012 XM_{43}	—	December 2, 2008	Kitt Peak	Spacewatch	·	1.1 km	MPC · JPL
515320	2012 XN_{61}	—	June 2, 2011	Haleakala	Pan-STARRS 1	V	720 m	MPC · JPL
515321	2012 XB_{76}	—	November 25, 2012	Kitt Peak	Spacewatch	·	920 m	MPC · JPL
515322	2012 XS_{116}	—	December 8, 2012	Mount Lemmon	Mount Lemmon Survey	·	1.6 km	MPC · JPL
515323	2012 XT_{139}	—	November 7, 2012	Mount Lemmon	Mount Lemmon Survey	LEO	1.3 km	MPC · JPL
515324	2012 XZ_{144}	—	December 17, 2003	Kitt Peak	Spacewatch	·	1.7 km	MPC · JPL
515325	2012 XO_{154}	—	November 11, 2012	Catalina	CSS	EUN	1.2 km	MPC · JPL
515326	2012 XC_{155}	—	November 2, 2008	Mount Lemmon	Mount Lemmon Survey	(5)	1.2 km	MPC · JPL
515327	2012 YF_{5}	—	December 18, 2004	Kitt Peak	Spacewatch	·	1.4 km	MPC · JPL
515328	2013 AE_{8}	—	January 28, 2004	Kitt Peak	Spacewatch	·	1.8 km	MPC · JPL
515329	2013 AD_{13}	—	December 12, 2012	Kitt Peak	Spacewatch	·	1.9 km	MPC · JPL
515330	2013 AL_{27}	—	January 7, 2013	Mount Lemmon	Mount Lemmon Survey	·	1.9 km	MPC · JPL
515331	2013 AQ_{44}	—	November 9, 2007	Kitt Peak	Spacewatch	AEO	1.1 km	MPC · JPL
515332	2013 AB_{49}	—	March 21, 2004	Kitt Peak	Spacewatch	·	1.5 km	MPC · JPL
515333	2013 AP_{52}	—	April 20, 2009	Kitt Peak	Spacewatch	·	1.9 km	MPC · JPL
515334	2013 AN_{55}	—	November 16, 2007	Mount Lemmon	Mount Lemmon Survey	EUN	1.7 km	MPC · JPL
515335	2013 AW_{60}	—	January 9, 2013	Mount Lemmon	Mount Lemmon Survey	AMO	640 m	MPC · JPL
515336	2013 AY_{98}	—	February 13, 2004	Kitt Peak	Spacewatch	DOR	2.0 km	MPC · JPL
515337	2013 AD_{128}	—	December 22, 2012	Haleakala	Pan-STARRS 1	·	1.2 km	MPC · JPL
515338	2013 AP_{136}	—	September 24, 2011	Haleakala	Pan-STARRS 1	PAD	1.6 km	MPC · JPL
515339	2013 AE_{143}	—	June 13, 2005	Kitt Peak	Spacewatch	JUN	1.0 km	MPC · JPL
515340	2013 AD_{170}	—	August 27, 2011	Haleakala	Pan-STARRS 1	·	1.2 km	MPC · JPL
515341	2013 AX_{184}	—	January 10, 2013	Haleakala	Pan-STARRS 1	·	1.4 km	MPC · JPL
515342	2013 BT_{10}	—	November 18, 2007	Kitt Peak	Spacewatch	·	1.4 km	MPC · JPL
515343	2013 BK_{14}	—	January 4, 2013	Mount Lemmon	Mount Lemmon Survey	EUN	1.2 km	MPC · JPL
515344	2013 BC_{15}	—	January 5, 2013	Mount Lemmon	Mount Lemmon Survey	·	1.5 km	MPC · JPL
515345	2013 BH_{38}	—	October 30, 2011	Mount Lemmon	Mount Lemmon Survey	·	1.8 km	MPC · JPL
515346	2013 BV_{39}	—	January 10, 2013	Haleakala	Pan-STARRS 1	·	1.5 km	MPC · JPL
515347	2013 BK_{61}	—	September 8, 2011	Haleakala	Pan-STARRS 1	·	2.0 km	MPC · JPL
515348	2013 BT_{67}	—	September 26, 2011	Haleakala	Pan-STARRS 1	NEM	2.3 km	MPC · JPL
515349	2013 BV_{70}	—	February 16, 2004	Kitt Peak	Spacewatch	·	1.7 km	MPC · JPL
515350	2013 CY_{9}	—	January 10, 2013	Haleakala	Pan-STARRS 1	·	1.3 km	MPC · JPL
515351	2013 CH_{32}	—	April 18, 2009	Kitt Peak	Spacewatch	·	1.5 km	MPC · JPL
515352	2013 CA_{54}	—	October 4, 2006	Mount Lemmon	Mount Lemmon Survey	·	1.9 km	MPC · JPL
515353	2013 CL_{61}	—	February 5, 2013	Kitt Peak	Spacewatch	·	1.8 km	MPC · JPL
515354	2013 CY_{74}	—	September 23, 2011	Haleakala	Pan-STARRS 1	·	1.6 km	MPC · JPL
515355	2013 CX_{96}	—	October 24, 2011	Haleakala	Pan-STARRS 1	AEO	1.2 km	MPC · JPL
515356	2013 CL_{110}	—	February 9, 2013	Haleakala	Pan-STARRS 1	·	2.0 km	MPC · JPL
515357	2013 CJ_{117}	—	September 29, 2011	Kitt Peak	Spacewatch	GEF	1.0 km	MPC · JPL
515358	2013 CY_{145}	—	September 17, 1996	Kitt Peak	Spacewatch	GEF	1.3 km	MPC · JPL
515359	2013 CH_{158}	—	February 10, 2008	Mount Lemmon	Mount Lemmon Survey	·	1.6 km	MPC · JPL
515360	2013 CS_{159}	—	January 11, 2008	Kitt Peak	Spacewatch	·	1.9 km	MPC · JPL
515361	2013 CJ_{162}	—	March 27, 2008	Kitt Peak	Spacewatch	KOR	1.3 km	MPC · JPL
515362	2013 CC_{178}	—	September 15, 2006	Kitt Peak	Spacewatch	·	1.8 km	MPC · JPL
515363	2013 CM_{188}	—	December 8, 2012	Mount Lemmon	Mount Lemmon Survey	·	1.6 km	MPC · JPL
515364	2013 CY_{204}	—	October 31, 2011	Mount Lemmon	Mount Lemmon Survey	·	1.8 km	MPC · JPL
515365	2013 CW_{224}	—	April 24, 2007	Mount Lemmon	Mount Lemmon Survey	·	2.7 km	MPC · JPL
515366	2013 DE_{1}	—	February 17, 2013	Catalina	CSS	H	490 m	MPC · JPL
515367	2013 EZ_{25}	—	March 9, 2003	Kitt Peak	Spacewatch	KOR	1.4 km	MPC · JPL
515368	2013 ER_{28}	—	February 11, 2008	Kitt Peak	Spacewatch	·	1.8 km	MPC · JPL
515369	2013 EE_{38}	—	March 8, 2008	Kitt Peak	Spacewatch	·	2.2 km	MPC · JPL
515370	2013 EJ_{38}	—	April 14, 2008	Mount Lemmon	Mount Lemmon Survey	·	2.6 km	MPC · JPL
515371	2013 EC_{41}	—	February 18, 2008	Mount Lemmon	Mount Lemmon Survey	H	350 m	MPC · JPL
515372	2013 EO_{58}	—	March 8, 2013	Haleakala	Pan-STARRS 1	·	3.4 km	MPC · JPL
515373	2013 EZ_{60}	—	February 28, 2008	Kitt Peak	Spacewatch	·	1.3 km	MPC · JPL
515374	2013 EV_{72}	—	November 27, 2011	Mount Lemmon	Mount Lemmon Survey	KOR	1.1 km	MPC · JPL
515375	2013 EN_{73}	—	February 28, 2008	Kitt Peak	Spacewatch	·	1.2 km	MPC · JPL
515376	2013 EJ_{76}	—	March 27, 2008	Kitt Peak	Spacewatch	·	1.9 km	MPC · JPL
515377	2013 EW_{81}	—	February 7, 2008	Mount Lemmon	Mount Lemmon Survey	·	1.3 km	MPC · JPL
515378	2013 EH_{87}	—	December 21, 2006	Mount Lemmon	Mount Lemmon Survey	EOS	1.8 km	MPC · JPL
515379	2013 ED_{108}	—	February 15, 2013	Haleakala	Pan-STARRS 1	·	1.9 km	MPC · JPL
515380	2013 EH_{155}	—	February 28, 2008	Mount Lemmon	Mount Lemmon Survey	·	1.5 km	MPC · JPL
515381	2013 EJ_{155}	—	October 7, 2005	Mount Lemmon	Mount Lemmon Survey	·	1.4 km	MPC · JPL
515382	2013 EN_{155}	—	November 11, 2006	Mount Lemmon	Mount Lemmon Survey	KOR	1.2 km	MPC · JPL
515383	2013 ER_{155}	—	November 28, 2006	Mount Lemmon	Mount Lemmon Survey	EOS	1.7 km	MPC · JPL
515384	2013 FD_{4}	—	March 31, 2008	Mount Lemmon	Mount Lemmon Survey	H	450 m	MPC · JPL
515385	2013 FT_{21}	—	March 31, 2008	Kitt Peak	Spacewatch	·	1.4 km	MPC · JPL
515386	2013 GP_{3}	—	March 16, 2013	Kitt Peak	Spacewatch	H	560 m	MPC · JPL
515387	2013 GG_{15}	—	May 5, 2008	Kitt Peak	Spacewatch	·	1.7 km	MPC · JPL
515388	2013 GU_{23}	—	October 22, 2005	Kitt Peak	Spacewatch	·	1.9 km	MPC · JPL
515389	2013 GF_{28}	—	April 26, 2008	Kitt Peak	Spacewatch	·	2.1 km	MPC · JPL
515390	2013 GG_{34}	—	April 5, 2013	Haleakala	Pan-STARRS 1	·	1.7 km	MPC · JPL
515391	2013 GZ_{42}	—	August 27, 2009	Kitt Peak	Spacewatch	·	1.9 km	MPC · JPL
515392	2013 GQ_{47}	—	March 19, 2013	Haleakala	Pan-STARRS 1	·	1.9 km	MPC · JPL
515393	2013 GY_{65}	—	April 30, 2008	Mount Lemmon	Mount Lemmon Survey	·	1.5 km	MPC · JPL
515394	2013 GX_{69}	—	April 6, 2013	Haleakala	Pan-STARRS 1	·	3.0 km	MPC · JPL
515395	2013 GV_{76}	—	April 14, 2008	Mount Lemmon	Mount Lemmon Survey	EOS	1.6 km	MPC · JPL
515396	2013 GN_{80}	—	April 25, 2008	Kitt Peak	Spacewatch	H	510 m	MPC · JPL
515397	2013 GJ_{88}	—	December 29, 2011	Kitt Peak	Spacewatch	·	2.9 km	MPC · JPL
515398	2013 GU_{105}	—	October 27, 2009	Mount Lemmon	Mount Lemmon Survey	·	2.5 km	MPC · JPL
515399	2013 GV_{116}	—	March 6, 2008	Mount Lemmon	Mount Lemmon Survey	·	2.0 km	MPC · JPL
515400	2013 GQ_{120}	—	February 21, 2007	Mount Lemmon	Mount Lemmon Survey	THM	2.0 km	MPC · JPL

== 515401–515500 ==
back to top

Designation			Discovery			Properties		Ref
Permanent	Provisional	Named after	Date	Site	Discoverer(s)	Category	Diam.	Ref
515401	2013 GS_{133}	—	March 28, 2008	Mount Lemmon	Mount Lemmon Survey	·	1.5 km	MPC · JPL
515402	2013 GM_{135}	—	April 13, 2013	Haleakala	Pan-STARRS 1	·	2.2 km	MPC · JPL
515403	2013 GE_{139}	—	March 12, 2013	Mount Lemmon	Mount Lemmon Survey	·	2.7 km	MPC · JPL
515404	2013 HB_{2}	—	April 11, 2013	Kitt Peak	Spacewatch	·	2.2 km	MPC · JPL
515405	2013 HU_{7}	—	April 10, 2013	Catalina	CSS	H	450 m	MPC · JPL
515406	2013 HB_{8}	—	August 24, 2011	La Sagra	OAM	H	440 m	MPC · JPL
515407	2013 HX_{18}	—	March 2, 2005	Kitt Peak	Spacewatch	H	470 m	MPC · JPL
515408	2013 HN_{24}	—	April 13, 2013	Haleakala	Pan-STARRS 1	·	2.4 km	MPC · JPL
515409	2013 HS_{26}	—	May 2, 2008	Mount Lemmon	Mount Lemmon Survey	·	1.8 km	MPC · JPL
515410	2013 HN_{32}	—	February 21, 2007	Mount Lemmon	Mount Lemmon Survey	·	2.4 km	MPC · JPL
515411	2013 HO_{33}	—	April 9, 2013	Haleakala	Pan-STARRS 1	·	3.7 km	MPC · JPL
515412	2013 HT_{37}	—	September 20, 2009	Mount Lemmon	Mount Lemmon Survey	·	1.9 km	MPC · JPL
515413	2013 HB_{41}	—	April 9, 2013	Haleakala	Pan-STARRS 1	EOS	1.2 km	MPC · JPL
515414	2013 HH_{50}	—	April 9, 2013	Haleakala	Pan-STARRS 1	EOS	1.5 km	MPC · JPL
515415	2013 HV_{60}	—	April 9, 2013	Haleakala	Pan-STARRS 1	·	2.0 km	MPC · JPL
515416	2013 HS_{66}	—	April 9, 2013	Haleakala	Pan-STARRS 1	HYG	2.7 km	MPC · JPL
515417	2013 HM_{88}	—	November 27, 2010	Mount Lemmon	Mount Lemmon Survey	·	2.4 km	MPC · JPL
515418	2013 HF_{92}	—	September 30, 2005	Kitt Peak	Spacewatch	·	2.3 km	MPC · JPL
515419	2013 HX_{100}	—	October 20, 1993	Kitt Peak	Spacewatch	·	2.3 km	MPC · JPL
515420	2013 HM_{106}	—	October 2, 2010	Kitt Peak	Spacewatch	THM	1.7 km	MPC · JPL
515421	2013 HC_{122}	—	October 9, 2005	Kitt Peak	Spacewatch	·	1.8 km	MPC · JPL
515422	2013 HA_{124}	—	April 9, 2013	Haleakala	Pan-STARRS 1	·	1.7 km	MPC · JPL
515423	2013 HE_{124}	—	April 29, 2008	Mount Lemmon	Mount Lemmon Survey	·	1.8 km	MPC · JPL
515424	2013 HL_{135}	—	March 12, 2007	Kitt Peak	Spacewatch	·	2.7 km	MPC · JPL
515425	2013 HK_{142}	—	October 11, 2004	Kitt Peak	Spacewatch	·	1.6 km	MPC · JPL
515426	2013 HQ_{146}	—	April 9, 2013	Haleakala	Pan-STARRS 1	THM	2.0 km	MPC · JPL
515427	2013 HE_{157}	—	February 3, 2012	Haleakala	Pan-STARRS 1	·	1.9 km	MPC · JPL
515428	2013 JS_{35}	—	March 10, 2007	Mount Lemmon	Mount Lemmon Survey	·	2.2 km	MPC · JPL
515429	2013 JA_{47}	—	February 14, 2013	Haleakala	Pan-STARRS 1	·	2.3 km	MPC · JPL
515430	2013 JO_{48}	—	April 2, 2013	Mount Lemmon	Mount Lemmon Survey	LIX	3.4 km	MPC · JPL
515431	2013 JG_{54}	—	April 15, 2013	Haleakala	Pan-STARRS 1	·	2.2 km	MPC · JPL
515432	2013 JF_{56}	—	April 15, 2013	Haleakala	Pan-STARRS 1	EOS	1.6 km	MPC · JPL
515433	2013 JE_{58}	—	April 15, 2013	Haleakala	Pan-STARRS 1	·	2.7 km	MPC · JPL
515434	2013 JU_{60}	—	April 15, 2013	Haleakala	Pan-STARRS 1	THM	2.1 km	MPC · JPL
515435	2013 KL_{8}	—	March 17, 2005	Kitt Peak	Spacewatch	H	500 m	MPC · JPL
515436	2013 KH_{12}	—	May 31, 2013	Haleakala	Pan-STARRS 1	H	400 m	MPC · JPL
515437	2013 KW_{16}	—	March 14, 2007	Kitt Peak	Spacewatch	HYG	2.4 km	MPC · JPL
515438	2013 LF_{30}	—	May 18, 2013	Mount Lemmon	Mount Lemmon Survey	H	430 m	MPC · JPL
515439	2013 OG_{2}	—	July 17, 2013	Haleakala	Pan-STARRS 1	H	580 m	MPC · JPL
515440	2013 RU_{65}	—	September 28, 1997	Kitt Peak	Spacewatch	3:2	5.0 km	MPC · JPL
515441	2013 TX_{33}	—	October 1, 2005	Kitt Peak	Spacewatch	3:2	5.3 km	MPC · JPL
515442	2013 TW_{90}	—	September 1, 2013	Mount Lemmon	Mount Lemmon Survey	L5	7.8 km	MPC · JPL
515443	2013 TZ_{131}	—	October 27, 2006	Mount Lemmon	Mount Lemmon Survey	·	560 m	MPC · JPL
515444	2013 TQ_{141}	—	October 1, 2006	Kitt Peak	Spacewatch	·	490 m	MPC · JPL
515445	2013 TW_{159}	—	October 9, 2013	Mount Lemmon	Mount Lemmon Survey	L5	7.9 km	MPC · JPL
515446	2013 UG_{5}	—	October 25, 2013	Haleakala	Pan-STARRS 1	AMO	300 m	MPC · JPL
515447	2013 UY_{15}	—	October 26, 2013	Kitt Peak	Spacewatch	L5	9.3 km	MPC · JPL
515448	2013 VK_{24}	—	August 24, 2011	Haleakala	Pan-STARRS 1	L5	10 km	MPC · JPL
515449	2013 VM_{24}	—	June 4, 2011	Mount Lemmon	Mount Lemmon Survey	L5	9.3 km	MPC · JPL
515450	2013 WB_{36}	—	November 27, 2013	Haleakala	Pan-STARRS 1	L5	9.1 km	MPC · JPL
515451	2013 WU_{50}	—	January 30, 2011	Kitt Peak	Spacewatch	·	1.1 km	MPC · JPL
515452	2013 WX_{55}	—	October 27, 2006	Mount Lemmon	Mount Lemmon Survey	·	480 m	MPC · JPL
515453	2013 WR_{100}	—	October 28, 2006	Mount Lemmon	Mount Lemmon Survey	·	750 m	MPC · JPL
515454	2013 WG_{106}	—	October 30, 2013	Kitt Peak	Spacewatch	·	1.1 km	MPC · JPL
515455	2013 WH_{110}	—	July 14, 2013	Haleakala	Pan-STARRS 1	L5	7.3 km	MPC · JPL
515456	2013 XP_{26}	—	October 23, 2006	Mount Lemmon	Mount Lemmon Survey	·	600 m	MPC · JPL
515457	2013 YX_{10}	—	May 1, 2011	Haleakala	Pan-STARRS 1	·	1.0 km	MPC · JPL
515458	2013 YU_{15}	—	December 24, 2013	Mount Lemmon	Mount Lemmon Survey	NYS	1.0 km	MPC · JPL
515459	2013 YW_{27}	—	February 23, 2007	Kitt Peak	Spacewatch	·	850 m	MPC · JPL
515460	2013 YX_{32}	—	February 29, 2004	Kitt Peak	Spacewatch	·	540 m	MPC · JPL
515461	2013 YM_{50}	—	December 24, 2013	Mount Lemmon	Mount Lemmon Survey	·	870 m	MPC · JPL
515462	2013 YR_{53}	—	December 24, 2006	Kitt Peak	Spacewatch	NYS	800 m	MPC · JPL
515463	2013 YR_{62}	—	October 25, 2005	Kitt Peak	Spacewatch	MAS	630 m	MPC · JPL
515464	2013 YK_{96}	—	November 9, 2009	Mount Lemmon	Mount Lemmon Survey	·	770 m	MPC · JPL
515465	2013 YN_{102}	—	January 25, 2007	Kitt Peak	Spacewatch	(2076)	810 m	MPC · JPL
515466	2013 YX_{109}	—	November 18, 2009	Kitt Peak	Spacewatch	·	810 m	MPC · JPL
515467	2013 YL_{113}	—	December 30, 2013	Kitt Peak	Spacewatch	·	710 m	MPC · JPL
515468	2013 YS_{125}	—	February 21, 2007	Kitt Peak	Spacewatch	NYS	970 m	MPC · JPL
515469	2013 YF_{152}	—	May 25, 2007	Mount Lemmon	Mount Lemmon Survey	·	1.2 km	MPC · JPL
515470	2013 YY_{152}	—	April 15, 2007	Kitt Peak	Spacewatch	MAS	560 m	MPC · JPL
515471	2014 AK_{6}	—	March 9, 2007	Mount Lemmon	Mount Lemmon Survey	MAS	620 m	MPC · JPL
515472	2014 AN_{10}	—	March 31, 2010	WISE	WISE	·	1.5 km	MPC · JPL
515473	2014 AW_{16}	—	December 14, 2013	Haleakala	Pan-STARRS 1	PHO	1.1 km	MPC · JPL
515474	2014 AD_{19}	—	March 14, 2007	Kitt Peak	Spacewatch	·	1.0 km	MPC · JPL
515475	2014 AM_{26}	—	April 3, 2011	Haleakala	Pan-STARRS 1	·	780 m	MPC · JPL
515476	2014 AF_{57}	—	March 23, 2001	Anderson Mesa	LONEOS	·	1.6 km	MPC · JPL
515477	2014 BN_{6}	—	December 30, 2013	Mount Lemmon	Mount Lemmon Survey	·	820 m	MPC · JPL
515478	2014 BL_{15}	—	April 14, 2007	Mount Lemmon	Mount Lemmon Survey	NYS	930 m	MPC · JPL
515479	2014 BX_{25}	—	April 22, 2007	Kitt Peak	Spacewatch	MAS	610 m	MPC · JPL
515480	2014 BF_{26}	—	January 1, 2014	Haleakala	Pan-STARRS 1	·	800 m	MPC · JPL
515481	2014 BZ_{26}	—	October 30, 2005	Kitt Peak	Spacewatch	NYS	1.0 km	MPC · JPL
515482	2014 BK_{28}	—	March 12, 2000	Kitt Peak	Spacewatch	·	810 m	MPC · JPL
515483	2014 BD_{35}	—	April 20, 2007	Kitt Peak	Spacewatch	·	970 m	MPC · JPL
515484	2014 BB_{44}	—	March 9, 1999	Kitt Peak	Spacewatch	MAS	670 m	MPC · JPL
515485	2014 BS_{44}	—	November 15, 2001	Kitt Peak	Spacewatch	MAS	580 m	MPC · JPL
515486	2014 BP_{65}	—	January 9, 2010	Mount Lemmon	Mount Lemmon Survey	·	1.6 km	MPC · JPL
515487	2014 CR_{1}	—	September 29, 2005	Kitt Peak	Spacewatch	MAS	580 m	MPC · JPL
515488	2014 DQ_{7}	—	October 18, 2008	Kitt Peak	Spacewatch	·	1.1 km	MPC · JPL
515489	2014 DB_{8}	—	April 4, 2011	Mount Lemmon	Mount Lemmon Survey	·	750 m	MPC · JPL
515490	2014 DN_{8}	—	March 23, 2003	Kitt Peak	Spacewatch	MAS	670 m	MPC · JPL
515491	2014 DV_{26}	—	November 25, 2005	Mount Lemmon	Mount Lemmon Survey	NYS	890 m	MPC · JPL
515492	2014 DU_{32}	—	November 2, 2008	Mount Lemmon	Mount Lemmon Survey	·	1.0 km	MPC · JPL
515493	2014 DE_{59}	—	November 1, 2008	Mount Lemmon	Mount Lemmon Survey	·	910 m	MPC · JPL
515494	2014 DS_{62}	—	February 26, 2014	Haleakala	Pan-STARRS 1	·	1.1 km	MPC · JPL
515495	2014 DV_{66}	—	November 6, 1996	Kitt Peak	Spacewatch	·	850 m	MPC · JPL
515496	2014 DD_{69}	—	January 23, 2006	Kitt Peak	Spacewatch	·	1.1 km	MPC · JPL
515497	2014 DB_{72}	—	April 14, 2010	Mount Lemmon	Mount Lemmon Survey	(5)	780 m	MPC · JPL
515498	2014 DK_{88}	—	February 10, 2014	Haleakala	Pan-STARRS 1	·	950 m	MPC · JPL
515499	2014 DL_{98}	—	July 22, 2011	Haleakala	Pan-STARRS 1	NYS	980 m	MPC · JPL
515500	2014 DA_{106}	—	September 2, 2011	Haleakala	Pan-STARRS 1	·	990 m	MPC · JPL

== 515501–515600 ==
back to top

Designation			Discovery			Properties		Ref
Permanent	Provisional	Named after	Date	Site	Discoverer(s)	Category	Diam.	Ref
515501	2014 DJ_{113}	—	September 10, 2007	Mount Lemmon	Mount Lemmon Survey	·	820 m	MPC · JPL
515502	2014 DP_{113}	—	January 3, 2014	Mount Lemmon	Mount Lemmon Survey	·	1.1 km	MPC · JPL
515503	2014 DP_{114}	—	September 24, 2008	Kitt Peak	Spacewatch	·	930 m	MPC · JPL
515504	2014 DL_{116}	—	March 16, 2010	Mount Lemmon	Mount Lemmon Survey	·	2.3 km	MPC · JPL
515505	2014 DP_{147}	—	October 14, 2007	Mount Lemmon	Mount Lemmon Survey	·	1.8 km	MPC · JPL
515506	2014 DJ_{148}	—	August 10, 2007	Kitt Peak	Spacewatch	·	930 m	MPC · JPL
515507	2014 DK_{148}	—	March 13, 2010	Mount Lemmon	Mount Lemmon Survey	·	950 m	MPC · JPL
515508	2014 ED_{7}	—	May 1, 2010	WISE	WISE	·	2.2 km	MPC · JPL
515509	2014 EO_{14}	—	September 16, 2012	Kitt Peak	Spacewatch	·	960 m	MPC · JPL
515510	2014 EX_{19}	—	November 12, 2012	Haleakala	Pan-STARRS 1	·	1.4 km	MPC · JPL
515511	2014 EQ_{21}	—	March 23, 2006	Kitt Peak	Spacewatch	(5)	880 m	MPC · JPL
515512	2014 EY_{26}	—	May 2, 2006	Kitt Peak	Spacewatch	·	1.1 km	MPC · JPL
515513	2014 ER_{30}	—	February 26, 2014	Haleakala	Pan-STARRS 1	·	1.2 km	MPC · JPL
515514	2014 EJ_{32}	—	May 12, 2010	Kitt Peak	Spacewatch	·	1.1 km	MPC · JPL
515515	2014 EQ_{45}	—	February 18, 2010	Mount Lemmon	Mount Lemmon Survey	·	790 m	MPC · JPL
515516	2014 EO_{47}	—	February 26, 2014	Mount Lemmon	Mount Lemmon Survey	·	1.2 km	MPC · JPL
515517	2014 EF_{102}	—	August 25, 2004	Kitt Peak	Spacewatch	·	1.4 km	MPC · JPL
515518	2014 ES_{133}	—	February 28, 2014	Haleakala	Pan-STARRS 1	(5)	820 m	MPC · JPL
515519	2014 EF_{225}	—	October 9, 2004	Kitt Peak	Spacewatch	·	1.3 km	MPC · JPL
515520	2014 EQ_{248}	—	March 11, 2014	Catalina	CSS	·	1.1 km	MPC · JPL
515521	2014 FG_{4}	—	October 7, 2012	Haleakala	Pan-STARRS 1	·	1.3 km	MPC · JPL
515522	2014 FQ_{5}	—	September 29, 2008	Mount Lemmon	Mount Lemmon Survey	·	900 m	MPC · JPL
515523	2014 FL_{9}	—	February 3, 2003	Kitt Peak	Spacewatch	·	1.3 km	MPC · JPL
515524	2014 FL_{35}	—	March 8, 2014	Mount Lemmon	Mount Lemmon Survey	·	1.3 km	MPC · JPL
515525	2014 FC_{57}	—	March 17, 2010	Kitt Peak	Spacewatch	MAR	840 m	MPC · JPL
515526	2014 FK_{64}	—	July 4, 2010	WISE	WISE	·	3.0 km	MPC · JPL
515527	2014 FJ_{73}	—	December 8, 2012	Mount Lemmon	Mount Lemmon Survey	·	1.3 km	MPC · JPL
515528	2014 FW_{73}	—	March 25, 2014	Kitt Peak	Spacewatch	·	1.5 km	MPC · JPL
515529	2014 FX_{73}	—	October 11, 2007	Mount Lemmon	Mount Lemmon Survey	·	1.8 km	MPC · JPL
515530	2014 GG_{5}	—	March 13, 2010	Kitt Peak	Spacewatch	·	2.6 km	MPC · JPL
515531	2014 GG_{6}	—	September 13, 2007	Kitt Peak	Spacewatch	·	1.3 km	MPC · JPL
515532	2014 GN_{7}	—	April 1, 2014	Mount Lemmon	Mount Lemmon Survey	·	940 m	MPC · JPL
515533	2014 GS_{7}	—	August 30, 2011	Haleakala	Pan-STARRS 1	·	1.1 km	MPC · JPL
515534	2014 GS_{13}	—	September 13, 2007	Kitt Peak	Spacewatch	MAR	850 m	MPC · JPL
515535	2014 GC_{14}	—	March 25, 2014	Kitt Peak	Spacewatch	·	1.3 km	MPC · JPL
515536	2014 GU_{25}	—	March 8, 2005	Mount Lemmon	Mount Lemmon Survey	·	1.5 km	MPC · JPL
515537	2014 GQ_{28}	—	April 4, 2014	Mount Lemmon	Mount Lemmon Survey	·	1.4 km	MPC · JPL
515538	2014 GJ_{30}	—	May 4, 2006	Kitt Peak	Spacewatch	·	910 m	MPC · JPL
515539	2014 GO_{37}	—	April 21, 2006	Kitt Peak	Spacewatch	·	650 m	MPC · JPL
515540	2014 GB_{43}	—	November 19, 2008	Kitt Peak	Spacewatch	·	960 m	MPC · JPL
515541	2014 GD_{43}	—	May 4, 2005	Mount Lemmon	Mount Lemmon Survey	·	1.3 km	MPC · JPL
515542	2014 GU_{45}	—	February 28, 2014	Haleakala	Pan-STARRS 1	NEM	2.0 km	MPC · JPL
515543	2014 GL_{53}	—	May 1, 2006	Kitt Peak	Spacewatch	·	1.1 km	MPC · JPL
515544	2014 GJ_{56}	—	April 5, 2014	Haleakala	Pan-STARRS 1	·	1.3 km	MPC · JPL
515545	2014 GK_{56}	—	February 27, 2009	Mount Lemmon	Mount Lemmon Survey	·	1.4 km	MPC · JPL
515546	2014 GA_{57}	—	October 19, 2007	Mount Lemmon	Mount Lemmon Survey	MAR	860 m	MPC · JPL
515547	2014 GC_{57}	—	October 10, 2007	Mount Lemmon	Mount Lemmon Survey	HNS	1 km	MPC · JPL
515548	2014 GK_{57}	—	September 23, 2011	Haleakala	Pan-STARRS 1	·	1.1 km	MPC · JPL
515549	2014 GM_{57}	—	February 27, 2009	Mount Lemmon	Mount Lemmon Survey	·	1.4 km	MPC · JPL
515550	2014 GZ_{57}	—	April 10, 2005	Mount Lemmon	Mount Lemmon Survey	·	1.6 km	MPC · JPL
515551	2014 GB_{58}	—	March 10, 2008	Kitt Peak	Spacewatch	·	3.0 km	MPC · JPL
515552	2014 HC_{2}	—	October 19, 2011	Mount Lemmon	Mount Lemmon Survey	BAR	1.2 km	MPC · JPL
515553	2014 HA_{8}	—	April 20, 2014	Kitt Peak	Spacewatch	·	1.5 km	MPC · JPL
515554	2014 HO_{13}	—	March 8, 2005	Mount Lemmon	Mount Lemmon Survey	·	1.2 km	MPC · JPL
515555	2014 HD_{16}	—	April 21, 2014	Mount Lemmon	Mount Lemmon Survey	·	1.7 km	MPC · JPL
515556	2014 HJ_{22}	—	January 10, 2014	Haleakala	Pan-STARRS 1	·	1.6 km	MPC · JPL
515557	2014 HT_{22}	—	February 1, 2013	Mount Lemmon	Mount Lemmon Survey	EUN	1.2 km	MPC · JPL
515558	2014 HY_{22}	—	December 30, 2008	Kitt Peak	Spacewatch	·	1.3 km	MPC · JPL
515559	2014 HD_{23}	—	April 17, 2010	WISE	WISE	ADE	2.2 km	MPC · JPL
515560	2014 HF_{23}	—	May 28, 2010	WISE	WISE	·	3.0 km	MPC · JPL
515561	2014 HG_{23}	—	March 24, 2014	Haleakala	Pan-STARRS 1	(194)	1.3 km	MPC · JPL
515562	2014 HK_{24}	—	April 22, 2014	Mount Lemmon	Mount Lemmon Survey	·	1.1 km	MPC · JPL
515563	2014 HU_{27}	—	December 22, 2008	Kitt Peak	Spacewatch	·	1.1 km	MPC · JPL
515564	2014 HW_{31}	—	January 2, 2009	Kitt Peak	Spacewatch	·	1.1 km	MPC · JPL
515565	2014 HJ_{33}	—	September 28, 2006	Kitt Peak	Spacewatch	AEO	990 m	MPC · JPL
515566	2014 HY_{38}	—	April 6, 2010	Kitt Peak	Spacewatch	·	1.0 km	MPC · JPL
515567	2014 HU_{40}	—	November 13, 2007	Mount Lemmon	Mount Lemmon Survey	·	1.4 km	MPC · JPL
515568	2014 HB_{43}	—	October 8, 2007	Mount Lemmon	Mount Lemmon Survey	EUN	1.2 km	MPC · JPL
515569	2014 HL_{47}	—	February 26, 2009	Kitt Peak	Spacewatch	HOF	2.1 km	MPC · JPL
515570	2014 HA_{98}	—	March 25, 2014	Kitt Peak	Spacewatch	(5)	1.2 km	MPC · JPL
515571	2014 HG_{100}	—	January 16, 2013	Haleakala	Pan-STARRS 1	·	1.5 km	MPC · JPL
515572	2014 HC_{102}	—	April 5, 2014	Haleakala	Pan-STARRS 1	·	1.5 km	MPC · JPL
515573	2014 HV_{131}	—	March 28, 2014	Mount Lemmon	Mount Lemmon Survey	·	1.4 km	MPC · JPL
515574	2014 HA_{136}	—	September 26, 2011	Haleakala	Pan-STARRS 1	HOF	2.0 km	MPC · JPL
515575	2014 HX_{137}	—	December 23, 2012	Haleakala	Pan-STARRS 1	·	1.6 km	MPC · JPL
515576	2014 HW_{151}	—	September 19, 2003	Palomar	NEAT	·	1.2 km	MPC · JPL
515577	2014 HF_{163}	—	February 26, 2014	Kitt Peak	Spacewatch	·	760 m	MPC · JPL
515578	2014 HG_{167}	—	September 24, 2011	Haleakala	Pan-STARRS 1	·	1.4 km	MPC · JPL
515579	2014 HK_{173}	—	November 17, 2008	Kitt Peak	Spacewatch	·	1.1 km	MPC · JPL
515580	2014 HU_{190}	—	March 13, 2005	Mount Lemmon	Mount Lemmon Survey	(1547)	1.3 km	MPC · JPL
515581	2014 HH_{202}	—	April 14, 2010	Mount Lemmon	Mount Lemmon Survey	EUN	970 m	MPC · JPL
515582	2014 HA_{203}	—	October 12, 2007	Mount Lemmon	Mount Lemmon Survey	·	1.1 km	MPC · JPL
515583	2014 JV	—	October 25, 2011	Kitt Peak	Spacewatch	·	1.9 km	MPC · JPL
515584	2014 JC_{12}	—	May 3, 2014	Mount Lemmon	Mount Lemmon Survey	·	1.3 km	MPC · JPL
515585	2014 JM_{12}	—	February 28, 2014	Haleakala	Pan-STARRS 1	·	1.5 km	MPC · JPL
515586	2014 JN_{12}	—	December 16, 2007	Kitt Peak	Spacewatch	AGN	920 m	MPC · JPL
515587	2014 JG_{13}	—	April 21, 2014	Kitt Peak	Spacewatch	·	1.9 km	MPC · JPL
515588	2014 JF_{14}	—	May 3, 2014	Mount Lemmon	Mount Lemmon Survey	·	1.2 km	MPC · JPL
515589	2014 JN_{16}	—	February 28, 2014	Haleakala	Pan-STARRS 1	·	1.5 km	MPC · JPL
515590	2014 JS_{22}	—	June 2, 2005	Mount Lemmon	Mount Lemmon Survey	·	1.5 km	MPC · JPL
515591	2014 JB_{27}	—	February 28, 2014	Haleakala	Pan-STARRS 1	·	1.5 km	MPC · JPL
515592	2014 JN_{31}	—	April 4, 2014	Haleakala	Pan-STARRS 1	·	1.5 km	MPC · JPL
515593	2014 JJ_{33}	—	April 5, 2014	Haleakala	Pan-STARRS 1	AGN	850 m	MPC · JPL
515594	2014 JA_{34}	—	March 28, 2014	Mount Lemmon	Mount Lemmon Survey	GEF	1.2 km	MPC · JPL
515595	2014 JU_{36}	—	September 23, 2011	Haleakala	Pan-STARRS 1	·	1.9 km	MPC · JPL
515596	2014 JQ_{40}	—	April 30, 2014	Haleakala	Pan-STARRS 1	GAL	1.3 km	MPC · JPL
515597	2014 JX_{40}	—	February 22, 2009	Kitt Peak	Spacewatch	·	1.3 km	MPC · JPL
515598	2014 JY_{45}	—	November 14, 2007	Kitt Peak	Spacewatch	·	1.4 km	MPC · JPL
515599	2014 JC_{53}	—	March 28, 2010	WISE	WISE	ADE	1.8 km	MPC · JPL
515600	2014 JX_{62}	—	April 29, 2010	WISE	WISE	·	1.8 km	MPC · JPL

== 515601–515700 ==
back to top

Designation			Discovery			Properties		Ref
Permanent	Provisional	Named after	Date	Site	Discoverer(s)	Category	Diam.	Ref
515601	2014 JL_{64}	—	December 5, 2008	Mount Lemmon	Mount Lemmon Survey	·	1.2 km	MPC · JPL
515602	2014 JD_{65}	—	January 10, 2013	Haleakala	Pan-STARRS 1	AGN	1.1 km	MPC · JPL
515603	2014 JN_{65}	—	February 22, 2001	Kitt Peak	Spacewatch	·	1.2 km	MPC · JPL
515604	2014 JT_{73}	—	May 8, 2005	Mount Lemmon	Mount Lemmon Survey	·	1.6 km	MPC · JPL
515605	2014 JK_{84}	—	December 6, 2012	Mount Lemmon	Mount Lemmon Survey	MAR	950 m	MPC · JPL
515606	2014 JA_{85}	—	March 17, 2005	Mount Lemmon	Mount Lemmon Survey	·	1.2 km	MPC · JPL
515607	2014 JC_{85}	—	October 12, 2007	Mount Lemmon	Mount Lemmon Survey	·	1.5 km	MPC · JPL
515608	2014 JG_{85}	—	November 8, 2007	Mount Lemmon	Mount Lemmon Survey	·	1.5 km	MPC · JPL
515609	2014 KM_{1}	—	June 17, 2010	Mount Lemmon	Mount Lemmon Survey	·	1.3 km	MPC · JPL
515610	2014 KA_{17}	—	May 4, 2014	Mount Lemmon	Mount Lemmon Survey	·	1.3 km	MPC · JPL
515611	2014 KF_{19}	—	May 8, 2014	Haleakala	Pan-STARRS 1	KOR	1.2 km	MPC · JPL
515612	2014 KC_{36}	—	March 11, 2005	Kitt Peak	Spacewatch	EUN	1.2 km	MPC · JPL
515613	2014 KM_{41}	—	April 7, 2005	Kitt Peak	Spacewatch	·	1.3 km	MPC · JPL
515614	2014 KF_{45}	—	September 27, 2006	Catalina	CSS	·	1.4 km	MPC · JPL
515615	2014 KZ_{52}	—	December 30, 2008	Kitt Peak	Spacewatch	·	1.3 km	MPC · JPL
515616	2014 KN_{67}	—	January 30, 2004	Kitt Peak	Spacewatch	·	1.7 km	MPC · JPL
515617	2014 KR_{87}	—	January 6, 2013	Mount Lemmon	Mount Lemmon Survey	·	1.8 km	MPC · JPL
515618	2014 KY_{91}	—	February 4, 2005	Kitt Peak	Spacewatch	·	1.5 km	MPC · JPL
515619	2014 KU_{94}	—	May 7, 2014	Haleakala	Pan-STARRS 1	·	1.7 km	MPC · JPL
515620	2014 KK_{98}	—	May 28, 2014	Haleakala	Pan-STARRS 1	·	2.5 km	MPC · JPL
515621	2014 KB_{104}	—	April 30, 2010	WISE	WISE	·	2.1 km	MPC · JPL
515622	2014 KC_{104}	—	July 14, 2010	WISE	WISE	·	2.6 km	MPC · JPL
515623	2014 KG_{104}	—	April 12, 2005	Kitt Peak	Spacewatch	ADE	1.5 km	MPC · JPL
515624	2014 KE_{105}	—	February 26, 2009	Catalina	CSS	·	1.5 km	MPC · JPL
515625	2014 KM_{105}	—	December 4, 2007	Mount Lemmon	Mount Lemmon Survey	·	1.4 km	MPC · JPL
515626	2014 LP	—	October 21, 2007	Mount Lemmon	Mount Lemmon Survey	EUN	1.3 km	MPC · JPL
515627	2014 LW_{3}	—	February 9, 2013	Haleakala	Pan-STARRS 1	·	1.7 km	MPC · JPL
515628	2014 LA_{6}	—	October 20, 2011	Mount Lemmon	Mount Lemmon Survey	·	1.6 km	MPC · JPL
515629	2014 LL_{12}	—	October 24, 2011	Haleakala	Pan-STARRS 1	·	1.4 km	MPC · JPL
515630	2014 LJ_{23}	—	March 2, 2009	Mount Lemmon	Mount Lemmon Survey	·	1.6 km	MPC · JPL
515631	2014 LM_{27}	—	February 14, 2005	Kitt Peak	Spacewatch	·	1.1 km	MPC · JPL
515632	2014 LG_{29}	—	February 3, 2012	Haleakala	Pan-STARRS 1	·	2.8 km	MPC · JPL
515633	2014 LU_{29}	—	April 29, 2008	Mount Lemmon	Mount Lemmon Survey	EOS	2.0 km	MPC · JPL
515634	2014 MR_{3}	—	December 1, 2011	Haleakala	Pan-STARRS 1	·	2.1 km	MPC · JPL
515635	2014 MW_{6}	—	April 28, 2014	Haleakala	Pan-STARRS 1	EUN	890 m	MPC · JPL
515636	2014 MX_{9}	—	June 21, 2014	Mount Lemmon	Mount Lemmon Survey	·	1.2 km	MPC · JPL
515637	2014 MO_{14}	—	January 17, 2013	Haleakala	Pan-STARRS 1	·	1.5 km	MPC · JPL
515638	2014 MC_{21}	—	November 23, 2011	Mount Lemmon	Mount Lemmon Survey	GEF	1.1 km	MPC · JPL
515639	2014 MK_{27}	—	June 27, 2014	Haleakala	Pan-STARRS 1	APO	160 m	MPC · JPL
515640	2014 MZ_{32}	—	August 12, 2010	Kitt Peak	Spacewatch	·	2.1 km	MPC · JPL
515641	2014 ML_{35}	—	June 23, 2010	WISE	WISE	·	3.5 km	MPC · JPL
515642	2014 MF_{57}	—	June 27, 2014	Haleakala	Pan-STARRS 1	·	2.7 km	MPC · JPL
515643	2014 MH_{64}	—	October 30, 2005	Kitt Peak	Spacewatch	·	2.0 km	MPC · JPL
515644	2014 ME_{72}	—	March 9, 2007	Mount Lemmon	Mount Lemmon Survey	·	2.3 km	MPC · JPL
515645	2014 NZ_{27}	—	July 2, 2014	Haleakala	Pan-STARRS 1	·	2.6 km	MPC · JPL
515646	2014 NB_{36}	—	September 29, 2009	Mount Lemmon	Mount Lemmon Survey	·	2.7 km	MPC · JPL
515647	2014 NP_{60}	—	January 19, 2012	Haleakala	Pan-STARRS 1	·	2.6 km	MPC · JPL
515648	2014 OA_{19}	—	December 25, 2005	Kitt Peak	Spacewatch	·	2.4 km	MPC · JPL
515649	2014 OU_{30}	—	October 25, 2005	Kitt Peak	Spacewatch	KOR	1.2 km	MPC · JPL
515650	2014 OZ_{37}	—	May 3, 2008	Mount Lemmon	Mount Lemmon Survey	·	1.9 km	MPC · JPL
515651	2014 OT_{41}	—	March 4, 2008	Mount Lemmon	Mount Lemmon Survey	·	1.4 km	MPC · JPL
515652	2014 OO_{46}	—	August 18, 2009	Kitt Peak	Spacewatch	VER	2.7 km	MPC · JPL
515653	2014 OY_{77}	—	June 27, 2014	Haleakala	Pan-STARRS 1	·	2.8 km	MPC · JPL
515654	2014 OL_{79}	—	July 26, 2014	Haleakala	Pan-STARRS 1	·	2.5 km	MPC · JPL
515655	2014 OP_{84}	—	December 1, 2005	Mount Lemmon	Mount Lemmon Survey	·	2.8 km	MPC · JPL
515656	2014 OX_{87}	—	November 12, 2010	Mount Lemmon	Mount Lemmon Survey	·	2.0 km	MPC · JPL
515657	2014 OB_{105}	—	January 10, 2013	Haleakala	Pan-STARRS 1	EUN	1.1 km	MPC · JPL
515658	2014 OH_{131}	—	October 25, 2011	Haleakala	Pan-STARRS 1	MAR	1.1 km	MPC · JPL
515659	2014 OW_{133}	—	February 3, 2012	Mount Lemmon	Mount Lemmon Survey	·	3.2 km	MPC · JPL
515660	2014 OA_{183}	—	February 21, 2007	Mount Lemmon	Mount Lemmon Survey	·	2.4 km	MPC · JPL
515661	2014 OZ_{190}	—	September 26, 1998	Socorro	LINEAR	·	3.1 km	MPC · JPL
515662	2014 OE_{201}	—	January 19, 2012	Kitt Peak	Spacewatch	URS	2.7 km	MPC · JPL
515663	2014 OM_{226}	—	April 11, 2013	Mount Lemmon	Mount Lemmon Survey	·	3.0 km	MPC · JPL
515664	2014 OV_{245}	—	September 7, 2004	Kitt Peak	Spacewatch	EOS	1.6 km	MPC · JPL
515665	2014 OH_{259}	—	August 17, 2009	Kitt Peak	Spacewatch	·	2.9 km	MPC · JPL
515666	2014 OY_{285}	—	April 19, 2013	Haleakala	Pan-STARRS 1	·	2.6 km	MPC · JPL
515667	2014 OE_{290}	—	June 26, 2014	Haleakala	Pan-STARRS 1	·	3.7 km	MPC · JPL
515668	2014 OP_{306}	—	December 3, 2010	Mount Lemmon	Mount Lemmon Survey	·	2.1 km	MPC · JPL
515669	2014 OH_{317}	—	January 31, 2006	Mount Lemmon	Mount Lemmon Survey	URS	2.8 km	MPC · JPL
515670	2014 OG_{322}	—	July 29, 2014	Haleakala	Pan-STARRS 1	·	2.3 km	MPC · JPL
515671	2014 OK_{328}	—	May 27, 2014	Mount Lemmon	Mount Lemmon Survey	HYG	2.2 km	MPC · JPL
515672	2014 OE_{352}	—	November 14, 2010	Kitt Peak	Spacewatch	·	1.7 km	MPC · JPL
515673	2014 OL_{361}	—	April 6, 2013	Mount Lemmon	Mount Lemmon Survey	·	1.3 km	MPC · JPL
515674	2014 OV_{374}	—	April 30, 2008	Mount Lemmon	Mount Lemmon Survey	·	1.4 km	MPC · JPL
515675	2014 OT_{378}	—	June 28, 2014	Haleakala	Pan-STARRS 1	·	2.7 km	MPC · JPL
515676	2014 OV_{381}	—	May 2, 2008	Kitt Peak	Spacewatch	·	2.2 km	MPC · JPL
515677	2014 OV_{385}	—	February 13, 2012	Haleakala	Pan-STARRS 1	VER	2.6 km	MPC · JPL
515678	2014 OK_{399}	—	May 11, 2008	Kitt Peak	Spacewatch	·	1.3 km	MPC · JPL
515679	2014 OE_{400}	—	January 18, 2012	Mount Lemmon	Mount Lemmon Survey	·	1.6 km	MPC · JPL
515680	2014 OO_{400}	—	March 14, 2013	Kitt Peak	Spacewatch	·	1.7 km	MPC · JPL
515681	2014 OA_{401}	—	July 25, 2014	Haleakala	Pan-STARRS 1	·	1.9 km	MPC · JPL
515682	2014 OV_{401}	—	May 7, 2008	Mount Lemmon	Mount Lemmon Survey	·	2.6 km	MPC · JPL
515683	2014 OG_{402}	—	January 30, 2011	Mount Lemmon	Mount Lemmon Survey	(260) · CYB	3.2 km	MPC · JPL
515684	2014 PA_{1}	—	February 1, 2012	Mount Lemmon	Mount Lemmon Survey	·	2.5 km	MPC · JPL
515685	2014 PL_{2}	—	December 1, 2008	Kitt Peak	Spacewatch	3:2	4.3 km	MPC · JPL
515686	2014 PG_{10}	—	April 13, 2013	Haleakala	Pan-STARRS 1	·	1.9 km	MPC · JPL
515687	2014 PB_{23}	—	May 6, 2014	Haleakala	Pan-STARRS 1	TIN	820 m	MPC · JPL
515688	2014 PC_{34}	—	September 11, 2007	Kitt Peak	Spacewatch	·	1.3 km	MPC · JPL
515689	2014 PX_{61}	—	September 17, 2009	Catalina	CSS	·	2.4 km	MPC · JPL
515690	2014 PN_{72}	—	January 22, 2006	Mount Lemmon	Mount Lemmon Survey	·	2.6 km	MPC · JPL
515691	2014 QY_{42}	—	May 26, 2014	Mount Lemmon	Mount Lemmon Survey	T_{j} (2.99) · EUP	3.2 km	MPC · JPL
515692	2014 QD_{49}	—	November 25, 2005	Mount Lemmon	Mount Lemmon Survey	·	2.2 km	MPC · JPL
515693	2014 QF_{54}	—	September 17, 2009	Mount Lemmon	Mount Lemmon Survey	HYG · fast	2.5 km	MPC · JPL
515694	2014 QH_{60}	—	March 3, 2013	Kitt Peak	Spacewatch	·	2.2 km	MPC · JPL
515695	2014 QM_{91}	—	January 19, 2012	Haleakala	Pan-STARRS 1	·	2.6 km	MPC · JPL
515696	2014 QS_{108}	—	June 3, 2014	Haleakala	Pan-STARRS 1	·	2.7 km	MPC · JPL
515697	2014 QV_{119}	—	May 8, 2013	Haleakala	Pan-STARRS 1	·	1.9 km	MPC · JPL
515698	2014 QV_{122}	—	January 19, 2012	Kitt Peak	Spacewatch	·	2.4 km	MPC · JPL
515699	2014 QL_{173}	—	October 17, 2009	Mount Lemmon	Mount Lemmon Survey	·	1.8 km	MPC · JPL
515700	2014 QF_{189}	—	April 18, 2007	Mount Lemmon	Mount Lemmon Survey	·	2.9 km	MPC · JPL

== 515701–515800 ==
back to top

Designation			Discovery			Properties		Ref
Permanent	Provisional	Named after	Date	Site	Discoverer(s)	Category	Diam.	Ref
515701	2014 QD_{201}	—	March 14, 2012	Catalina	CSS	·	3.2 km	MPC · JPL
515702	2014 QU_{339}	—	January 19, 2012	Haleakala	Pan-STARRS 1	·	2.2 km	MPC · JPL
515703	2014 QB_{340}	—	February 23, 2007	Mount Lemmon	Mount Lemmon Survey	·	2.4 km	MPC · JPL
515704	2014 QD_{366}	—	October 21, 2003	Palomar	NEAT	LUT	5.0 km	MPC · JPL
515705	2014 QS_{375}	—	August 27, 2014	Haleakala	Pan-STARRS 1	VER	2.1 km	MPC · JPL
515706	2014 QT_{380}	—	September 19, 2003	Kitt Peak	Spacewatch	·	3.0 km	MPC · JPL
515707	2014 QZ_{383}	—	February 8, 2007	Mount Lemmon	Mount Lemmon Survey	·	2.3 km	MPC · JPL
515708	2014 QL_{447}	—	January 23, 2006	Kitt Peak	Spacewatch	·	3.0 km	MPC · JPL
515709	2014 QZ_{449}	—	March 14, 2007	Mount Lemmon	Mount Lemmon Survey	·	2.4 km	MPC · JPL
515710	2014 QG_{450}	—	March 14, 2007	Mount Lemmon	Mount Lemmon Survey	·	2.6 km	MPC · JPL
515711	2014 RT_{7}	—	February 23, 2012	Mount Lemmon	Mount Lemmon Survey	·	2.1 km	MPC · JPL
515712	2014 SF_{60}	—	June 28, 2014	Mount Lemmon	Mount Lemmon Survey	·	3.0 km	MPC · JPL
515713	2014 SM_{223}	—	August 1, 2009	Siding Spring	SSS	·	1.9 km	MPC · JPL
515714	2014 TT_{3}	—	March 26, 2006	Mount Lemmon	Mount Lemmon Survey	·	3.0 km	MPC · JPL
515715	2014 TR_{61}	—	March 14, 2007	Mount Lemmon	Mount Lemmon Survey	·	4.0 km	MPC · JPL
515716	2014 UD_{64}	—	September 28, 2003	Kitt Peak	Spacewatch	·	3.5 km	MPC · JPL
515717	2014 UX_{182}	—	April 6, 2008	Kitt Peak	Spacewatch	L5	7.8 km	MPC · JPL
515718	2014 UQ_{194}	—	March 28, 2008	Kitt Peak	Spacewatch	T_{j} (2.83)	7.8 km	MPC · JPL
515719	2014 VJ_{2}	—	April 29, 2003	Socorro	LINEAR	H	450 m	MPC · JPL
515720	2014 VL_{2}	—	August 31, 2014	Haleakala	Pan-STARRS 1	H	600 m	MPC · JPL
515721	2014 WM_{220}	—	September 3, 2013	Kitt Peak	Spacewatch	L5	7.2 km	MPC · JPL
515722	2014 WE_{242}	—	December 8, 2005	Kitt Peak	Spacewatch	·	4.1 km	MPC · JPL
515723	2014 WR_{246}	—	March 15, 2007	Mount Lemmon	Mount Lemmon Survey	·	3.5 km	MPC · JPL
515724	2014 WZ_{364}	—	September 28, 2006	Kitt Peak	Spacewatch	H	380 m	MPC · JPL
515725	2014 WT_{366}	—	September 24, 2011	Catalina	CSS	H	670 m	MPC · JPL
515726	2014 WD_{387}	—	November 27, 2014	Kitt Peak	Spacewatch	L5	8.7 km	MPC · JPL
515727	2014 WF_{403}	—	April 14, 2008	Kitt Peak	Spacewatch	L5	8.0 km	MPC · JPL
515728	2014 WS_{490}	—	March 10, 2008	Mount Lemmon	Mount Lemmon Survey	L5	10 km	MPC · JPL
515729	2014 WV_{500}	—	June 9, 2004	Kitt Peak	Spacewatch	·	2.1 km	MPC · JPL
515730	2014 WT_{510}	—	May 15, 2008	Mount Lemmon	Mount Lemmon Survey	L5	7.5 km	MPC · JPL
515731	2014 WS_{511}	—	December 27, 2011	Mount Lemmon	Mount Lemmon Survey	H	570 m	MPC · JPL
515732	2014 XW_{31}	—	December 13, 2014	Haleakala	Pan-STARRS 1	H	550 m	MPC · JPL
515733	2014 YX_{43}	—	December 30, 2014	Haleakala	Pan-STARRS 1	H	380 m	MPC · JPL
515734	2014 YQ_{50}	—	October 2, 2008	Mount Lemmon	Mount Lemmon Survey	H	560 m	MPC · JPL
515735	2014 YX_{50}	—	February 17, 2007	Kitt Peak	Spacewatch	H	410 m	MPC · JPL
515736	2014 YA_{52}	—	July 11, 2005	Kitt Peak	Spacewatch	H	430 m	MPC · JPL
515737	2015 AL_{26}	—	March 14, 2007	Kitt Peak	Spacewatch	H	440 m	MPC · JPL
515738	2015 AW_{95}	—	March 15, 2007	Mount Lemmon	Mount Lemmon Survey	L5	8.8 km	MPC · JPL
515739	2015 BV_{101}	—	March 15, 2005	Mount Lemmon	Mount Lemmon Survey	·	1.9 km	MPC · JPL
515740	2015 BO_{298}	—	December 8, 2010	Mount Lemmon	Mount Lemmon Survey	NYS	1.1 km	MPC · JPL
515741	2015 BO_{512}	—	July 2, 2005	Kitt Peak	Spacewatch	H	510 m	MPC · JPL
515742	2015 CU	—	February 8, 2015	Haleakala	Pan-STARRS 1	ATE	240 m	MPC · JPL
515743	2015 CY_{24}	—	January 18, 2012	Catalina	CSS	·	800 m	MPC · JPL
515744	2015 CX_{61}	—	March 20, 1998	Socorro	LINEAR	·	1.3 km	MPC · JPL
515745	2015 DT_{230}	—	October 27, 2006	Mount Lemmon	Mount Lemmon Survey	·	710 m	MPC · JPL
515746	2015 EB_{39}	—	February 21, 2012	Kitt Peak	Spacewatch	·	870 m	MPC · JPL
515747	2015 FH_{1}	—	March 18, 2002	Kitt Peak	Spacewatch	EUN	1.3 km	MPC · JPL
515748	2015 FQ_{6}	—	January 19, 2015	Haleakala	Pan-STARRS 1	H	460 m	MPC · JPL
515749	2015 FN_{40}	—	November 9, 2013	Mount Lemmon	Mount Lemmon Survey	·	590 m	MPC · JPL
515750	2015 FD_{76}	—	November 17, 2008	Kitt Peak	Spacewatch	·	1.9 km	MPC · JPL
515751	2015 FQ_{163}	—	December 18, 2007	Mount Lemmon	Mount Lemmon Survey	·	600 m	MPC · JPL
515752	2015 FX_{200}	—	January 21, 2015	Haleakala	Pan-STARRS 1	·	600 m	MPC · JPL
515753	2015 FM_{211}	—	September 27, 2006	Mount Lemmon	Mount Lemmon Survey	·	740 m	MPC · JPL
515754	2015 FX_{326}	—	April 21, 1998	Kitt Peak	Spacewatch	·	630 m	MPC · JPL
515755	2015 FS_{330}	—	December 28, 2011	Catalina	CSS	H	680 m	MPC · JPL
515756	2015 FM_{334}	—	September 21, 2012	Catalina	CSS	V	640 m	MPC · JPL
515757	2015 FB_{354}	—	January 31, 2009	Mount Lemmon	Mount Lemmon Survey	·	2.3 km	MPC · JPL
515758	2015 FJ_{384}	—	February 23, 2015	Haleakala	Pan-STARRS 1	·	1.5 km	MPC · JPL
515759	2015 FS_{402}	—	March 6, 2008	Mount Lemmon	Mount Lemmon Survey	·	690 m	MPC · JPL
515760	2015 GW_{2}	—	June 6, 2013	Mount Lemmon	Mount Lemmon Survey	H	660 m	MPC · JPL
515761	2015 GH_{34}	—	February 11, 2008	Kitt Peak	Spacewatch	·	570 m	MPC · JPL
515762	2015 HT_{15}	—	November 10, 2013	Kitt Peak	Spacewatch	·	690 m	MPC · JPL
515763	2015 HJ_{36}	—	March 21, 2015	Haleakala	Pan-STARRS 1	·	740 m	MPC · JPL
515764	2015 HC_{84}	—	October 5, 2003	Kitt Peak	Spacewatch	·	720 m	MPC · JPL
515765	2015 HC_{92}	—	July 30, 2008	Mount Lemmon	Mount Lemmon Survey	NYS	1.1 km	MPC · JPL
515766	2015 HH_{186}	—	October 2, 2006	Mount Lemmon	Mount Lemmon Survey	·	570 m	MPC · JPL
515767	2015 JA_{2}	—	May 13, 2015	Haleakala	Pan-STARRS 2	APO · PHA · fast	210 m	MPC · JPL
515768	2015 JR_{3}	—	August 30, 2005	Kitt Peak	Spacewatch	·	860 m	MPC · JPL
515769	2015 KK_{10}	—	June 10, 2011	Mount Lemmon	Mount Lemmon Survey	fast	1.3 km	MPC · JPL
515770	2015 KW_{25}	—	April 11, 2008	Mount Lemmon	Mount Lemmon Survey	·	710 m	MPC · JPL
515771	2015 KB_{29}	—	June 14, 2012	Haleakala	Pan-STARRS 1	·	640 m	MPC · JPL
515772	2015 KX_{36}	—	November 14, 2012	Kitt Peak	Spacewatch	·	850 m	MPC · JPL
515773	2015 KS_{38}	—	November 19, 2009	Mount Lemmon	Mount Lemmon Survey	·	580 m	MPC · JPL
515774	2015 KX_{38}	—	April 2, 2009	Kitt Peak	Spacewatch	·	3.4 km	MPC · JPL
515775	2015 KX_{49}	—	September 21, 2009	Kitt Peak	Spacewatch	·	530 m	MPC · JPL
515776	2015 KZ_{51}	—	December 3, 2004	Kitt Peak	Spacewatch	·	1.8 km	MPC · JPL
515777	2015 KJ_{52}	—	March 11, 2008	Mount Lemmon	Mount Lemmon Survey	·	570 m	MPC · JPL
515778	2015 KW_{55}	—	October 18, 2012	Haleakala	Pan-STARRS 1	·	820 m	MPC · JPL
515779	2015 KN_{74}	—	March 31, 2015	Haleakala	Pan-STARRS 1	·	1.3 km	MPC · JPL
515780	2015 KZ_{88}	—	August 17, 2012	Haleakala	Pan-STARRS 1	·	730 m	MPC · JPL
515781	2015 KF_{137}	—	April 13, 2008	Kitt Peak	Spacewatch	(2076)	600 m	MPC · JPL
515782	2015 KV_{146}	—	February 25, 2006	Kitt Peak	Spacewatch	·	1 km	MPC · JPL
515783	2015 KY_{147}	—	May 24, 2015	Haleakala	Pan-STARRS 1	BRG	1.7 km	MPC · JPL
515784	2015 KD_{151}	—	March 28, 2015	Haleakala	Pan-STARRS 1	·	1.0 km	MPC · JPL
515785	2015 KC_{154}	—	September 4, 2008	Kitt Peak	Spacewatch	NYS	1.1 km	MPC · JPL
515786	2015 KD_{161}	—	October 3, 2006	Mount Lemmon	Mount Lemmon Survey	·	720 m	MPC · JPL
515787	2015 KU_{165}	—	February 10, 2007	Mount Lemmon	Mount Lemmon Survey	·	2.5 km	MPC · JPL
515788	2015 KY_{165}	—	February 21, 2007	Mount Lemmon	Mount Lemmon Survey	·	860 m	MPC · JPL
515789	2015 LD_{15}	—	November 7, 2012	Mount Lemmon	Mount Lemmon Survey	MAR	920 m	MPC · JPL
515790	2015 LK_{20}	—	May 19, 2006	Mount Lemmon	Mount Lemmon Survey	MAR	1.0 km	MPC · JPL
515791	2015 LT_{21}	—	November 21, 2005	Kitt Peak	Spacewatch	·	1.4 km	MPC · JPL
515792	2015 LC_{22}	—	January 11, 2008	Mount Lemmon	Mount Lemmon Survey	·	2.2 km	MPC · JPL
515793	2015 LH_{23}	—	September 6, 2008	Catalina	CSS	NYS	1.2 km	MPC · JPL
515794	2015 LR_{27}	—	March 16, 2004	Kitt Peak	Spacewatch	·	750 m	MPC · JPL
515795	2015 LA_{36}	—	August 3, 2011	Haleakala	Pan-STARRS 1	MAR	1.0 km	MPC · JPL
515796	2015 LS_{38}	—	June 15, 2015	Haleakala	Pan-STARRS 1	·	2.0 km	MPC · JPL
515797	2015 LR_{39}	—	August 2, 2011	Haleakala	Pan-STARRS 1	·	1.2 km	MPC · JPL
515798	2015 LG_{42}	—	July 1, 2011	Kitt Peak	Spacewatch	·	1.6 km	MPC · JPL
515799	2015 LK_{42}	—	December 31, 2008	Kitt Peak	Spacewatch	·	1.8 km	MPC · JPL
515800	2015 LL_{42}	—	January 5, 2013	Mount Lemmon	Mount Lemmon Survey	PAD	1.4 km	MPC · JPL

== 515801–515900 ==
back to top

Designation			Discovery			Properties		Ref
Permanent	Provisional	Named after	Date	Site	Discoverer(s)	Category	Diam.	Ref
515801	2015 MQ_{6}	—	February 27, 2006	Mount Lemmon	Mount Lemmon Survey	·	950 m	MPC · JPL
515802	2015 MR_{7}	—	April 24, 2006	Kitt Peak	Spacewatch	·	1.4 km	MPC · JPL
515803	2015 MK_{9}	—	September 25, 2011	Haleakala	Pan-STARRS 1	·	1.9 km	MPC · JPL
515804	2015 MO_{9}	—	March 13, 2011	Mount Lemmon	Mount Lemmon Survey	·	670 m	MPC · JPL
515805	2015 ME_{12}	—	October 11, 2012	Haleakala	Pan-STARRS 1	·	940 m	MPC · JPL
515806	2015 MC_{26}	—	October 5, 2012	Haleakala	Pan-STARRS 1	V	430 m	MPC · JPL
515807	2015 MT_{46}	—	January 24, 2014	Haleakala	Pan-STARRS 1	·	850 m	MPC · JPL
515808	2015 MY_{47}	—	April 6, 2011	Mount Lemmon	Mount Lemmon Survey	V	610 m	MPC · JPL
515809	2015 MP_{49}	—	February 26, 2014	Haleakala	Pan-STARRS 1	·	1.3 km	MPC · JPL
515810	2015 MU_{50}	—	September 21, 2011	Kitt Peak	Spacewatch	MAR	1.0 km	MPC · JPL
515811	2015 MW_{50}	—	December 5, 2007	Kitt Peak	Spacewatch	·	1.8 km	MPC · JPL
515812 Pueo	2015 ME_{52}	Pueo	October 20, 2012	Haleakala	Pan-STARRS 1	V	590 m	MPC · JPL
515813	2015 MJ_{54}	—	April 25, 2015	Haleakala	Pan-STARRS 1	PHO	1.1 km	MPC · JPL
515814	2015 MS_{56}	—	May 30, 2008	Mount Lemmon	Mount Lemmon Survey	·	790 m	MPC · JPL
515815	2015 MF_{57}	—	December 12, 2004	Kitt Peak	Spacewatch	·	1.4 km	MPC · JPL
515816	2015 MC_{58}	—	October 27, 2008	Kitt Peak	Spacewatch	MAS	710 m	MPC · JPL
515817	2015 MZ_{74}	—	April 20, 2007	Kitt Peak	Spacewatch	·	990 m	MPC · JPL
515818	2015 MO_{79}	—	October 8, 2008	Mount Lemmon	Mount Lemmon Survey	·	1.1 km	MPC · JPL
515819	2015 ME_{85}	—	April 23, 2011	Haleakala	Pan-STARRS 1	·	600 m	MPC · JPL
515820	2015 MX_{90}	—	April 2, 2006	Kitt Peak	Spacewatch	T_{j} (2.97)	3.9 km	MPC · JPL
515821	2015 MU_{106}	—	November 23, 2012	Kitt Peak	Spacewatch	·	1.1 km	MPC · JPL
515822	2015 MS_{111}	—	October 11, 2005	Kitt Peak	Spacewatch	·	740 m	MPC · JPL
515823	2015 MM_{114}	—	November 30, 2011	Catalina	CSS	·	2.4 km	MPC · JPL
515824	2015 MD_{115}	—	March 11, 2014	Mount Lemmon	Mount Lemmon Survey	·	1.2 km	MPC · JPL
515825	2015 ML_{117}	—	March 6, 2011	Mount Lemmon	Mount Lemmon Survey	·	610 m	MPC · JPL
515826	2015 ML_{121}	—	August 27, 2006	Kitt Peak	Spacewatch	·	1.5 km	MPC · JPL
515827	2015 MG_{126}	—	July 2, 2011	Mount Lemmon	Mount Lemmon Survey	·	850 m	MPC · JPL
515828	2015 MV_{134}	—	October 31, 2005	Mount Lemmon	Mount Lemmon Survey	THM	2.0 km	MPC · JPL
515829	2015 MF_{135}	—	February 20, 2009	Kitt Peak	Spacewatch	·	2.0 km	MPC · JPL
515830	2015 MJ_{135}	—	October 8, 2007	Mount Lemmon	Mount Lemmon Survey	·	1.1 km	MPC · JPL
515831	2015 MF_{136}	—	August 5, 2010	WISE	WISE	·	1.9 km	MPC · JPL
515832	2015 MV_{136}	—	September 18, 2007	Mount Lemmon	Mount Lemmon Survey	·	1.3 km	MPC · JPL
515833	2015 MK_{137}	—	October 2, 2008	Kitt Peak	Spacewatch	NYS	1.1 km	MPC · JPL
515834	2015 NP_{4}	—	October 27, 2008	Mount Lemmon	Mount Lemmon Survey	·	1.1 km	MPC · JPL
515835	2015 NC_{6}	—	June 30, 2010	WISE	WISE	·	1.9 km	MPC · JPL
515836	2015 NO_{16}	—	June 16, 2006	Kitt Peak	Spacewatch	JUN	1.1 km	MPC · JPL
515837	2015 NX_{18}	—	December 31, 2008	Kitt Peak	Spacewatch	(194)	1.2 km	MPC · JPL
515838	2015 NF_{19}	—	October 20, 2006	Catalina	CSS	BRA	1.7 km	MPC · JPL
515839	2015 NQ_{23}	—	February 14, 2010	Kitt Peak	Spacewatch	·	1.3 km	MPC · JPL
515840	2015 NR_{26}	—	July 9, 2015	Haleakala	Pan-STARRS 1	MAR	1.2 km	MPC · JPL
515841	2015 OB_{2}	—	June 6, 2011	Haleakala	Pan-STARRS 1	·	1.1 km	MPC · JPL
515842	2015 OO_{10}	—	February 8, 2007	Kitt Peak	Spacewatch	·	950 m	MPC · JPL
515843	2015 OY_{15}	—	August 28, 2011	Haleakala	Pan-STARRS 1	·	1.2 km	MPC · JPL
515844	2015 OX_{17}	—	August 18, 2006	Kitt Peak	Spacewatch	AGN	1.0 km	MPC · JPL
515845	2015 OY_{27}	—	May 7, 2014	Haleakala	Pan-STARRS 1	·	2.5 km	MPC · JPL
515846	2015 OK_{31}	—	July 24, 2010	WISE	WISE	·	2.9 km	MPC · JPL
515847	2015 OL_{32}	—	November 7, 2012	Mount Lemmon	Mount Lemmon Survey	V	640 m	MPC · JPL
515848	2015 OH_{36}	—	July 31, 2008	La Sagra	OAM	·	650 m	MPC · JPL
515849	2015 OU_{36}	—	August 23, 2011	Haleakala	Pan-STARRS 1	·	1.4 km	MPC · JPL
515850	2015 OE_{37}	—	February 26, 2009	Catalina	CSS	HNS	1.1 km	MPC · JPL
515851	2015 OH_{53}	—	December 25, 2011	Mount Lemmon	Mount Lemmon Survey	·	2.5 km	MPC · JPL
515852	2015 OD_{55}	—	March 7, 2003	Apache Point	SDSS	PHO	1.1 km	MPC · JPL
515853	2015 OP_{68}	—	November 2, 2007	Kitt Peak	Spacewatch	NEM	1.9 km	MPC · JPL
515854	2015 OW_{71}	—	September 14, 2007	Mount Lemmon	Mount Lemmon Survey	·	1.2 km	MPC · JPL
515855	2015 OA_{73}	—	August 23, 2011	Haleakala	Pan-STARRS 1	·	1.4 km	MPC · JPL
515856	2015 OO_{76}	—	April 21, 2006	Kitt Peak	Spacewatch	(5)	1.1 km	MPC · JPL
515857	2015 OJ_{77}	—	February 21, 2007	Mount Lemmon	Mount Lemmon Survey	·	3.1 km	MPC · JPL
515858	2015 OX_{82}	—	May 28, 2014	Haleakala	Pan-STARRS 1	KOR	1.2 km	MPC · JPL
515859	2015 ON_{84}	—	February 16, 2013	Mount Lemmon	Mount Lemmon Survey	·	1.7 km	MPC · JPL
515860	2015 OD_{85}	—	April 7, 2008	Kitt Peak	Spacewatch	EOS	1.9 km	MPC · JPL
515861	2015 OH_{85}	—	January 10, 2013	Kitt Peak	Spacewatch	·	1.4 km	MPC · JPL
515862	2015 OD_{86}	—	March 15, 2007	Mount Lemmon	Mount Lemmon Survey	V	670 m	MPC · JPL
515863	2015 OG_{86}	—	November 14, 2006	Kitt Peak	Spacewatch	KOR	950 m	MPC · JPL
515864	2015 OF_{87}	—	September 13, 2007	Mount Lemmon	Mount Lemmon Survey	·	930 m	MPC · JPL
515865	2015 OG_{87}	—	February 28, 2014	Haleakala	Pan-STARRS 1	·	990 m	MPC · JPL
515866	2015 OQ_{87}	—	September 20, 1995	Kitt Peak	Spacewatch	·	980 m	MPC · JPL
515867	2015 OE_{88}	—	September 9, 2010	Kitt Peak	Spacewatch	TEL	1.0 km	MPC · JPL
515868	2015 OM_{88}	—	July 9, 2010	WISE	WISE	·	1.9 km	MPC · JPL
515869	2015 OS_{88}	—	September 24, 2011	Haleakala	Pan-STARRS 1	·	1.7 km	MPC · JPL
515870	2015 OU_{88}	—	February 15, 2013	Haleakala	Pan-STARRS 1	·	2.1 km	MPC · JPL
515871	2015 PO_{1}	—	September 10, 2007	Kitt Peak	Spacewatch	·	1.1 km	MPC · JPL
515872	2015 PV_{2}	—	July 1, 2011	Haleakala	Pan-STARRS 1	·	1.5 km	MPC · JPL
515873	2015 PE_{3}	—	June 27, 2015	Haleakala	Pan-STARRS 1	·	1.2 km	MPC · JPL
515874	2015 PK_{3}	—	January 17, 2007	Kitt Peak	Spacewatch	·	2.0 km	MPC · JPL
515875	2015 PB_{4}	—	February 26, 2014	Haleakala	Pan-STARRS 1	·	1.3 km	MPC · JPL
515876	2015 PC_{4}	—	September 12, 2007	Catalina	CSS	·	1.0 km	MPC · JPL
515877	2015 PA_{6}	—	July 22, 2011	Haleakala	Pan-STARRS 1	·	1.5 km	MPC · JPL
515878	2015 PT_{9}	—	September 11, 2004	Kitt Peak	Spacewatch	·	970 m	MPC · JPL
515879	2015 PY_{12}	—	May 13, 2010	WISE	WISE	PHO	1.0 km	MPC · JPL
515880	2015 PF_{26}	—	January 2, 2013	Mount Lemmon	Mount Lemmon Survey	·	1.4 km	MPC · JPL
515881	2015 PL_{26}	—	August 28, 2006	Catalina	CSS	·	1.8 km	MPC · JPL
515882	2015 PO_{26}	—	September 4, 2011	Haleakala	Pan-STARRS 1	·	1.4 km	MPC · JPL
515883	2015 PB_{30}	—	August 20, 2003	Campo Imperatore	CINEOS	·	1 km	MPC · JPL
515884	2015 PB_{31}	—	March 5, 2006	Kitt Peak	Spacewatch	·	1.4 km	MPC · JPL
515885	2015 PP_{35}	—	March 23, 2006	Kitt Peak	Spacewatch	·	890 m	MPC · JPL
515886	2015 PR_{36}	—	October 22, 2011	Mount Lemmon	Mount Lemmon Survey	·	2.0 km	MPC · JPL
515887	2015 PE_{37}	—	September 21, 2011	Kitt Peak	Spacewatch	·	1.8 km	MPC · JPL
515888	2015 PH_{38}	—	April 28, 2003	Kitt Peak	Spacewatch	NYS	1.2 km	MPC · JPL
515889	2015 PY_{38}	—	March 12, 2014	Mount Lemmon	Mount Lemmon Survey	EUN	1.1 km	MPC · JPL
515890	2015 PH_{40}	—	January 13, 2008	Kitt Peak	Spacewatch	·	1.8 km	MPC · JPL
515891	2015 PC_{42}	—	September 15, 2007	Mount Lemmon	Mount Lemmon Survey	WIT	860 m	MPC · JPL
515892	2015 PK_{43}	—	November 19, 2003	Kitt Peak	Spacewatch	·	1.5 km	MPC · JPL
515893	2015 PY_{44}	—	December 21, 2005	Kitt Peak	Spacewatch	·	1.4 km	MPC · JPL
515894	2015 PR_{45}	—	December 17, 2007	Kitt Peak	Spacewatch	·	1.8 km	MPC · JPL
515895	2015 PD_{46}	—	April 14, 2005	Kitt Peak	Spacewatch	·	1.5 km	MPC · JPL
515896	2015 PG_{48}	—	August 27, 2011	Haleakala	Pan-STARRS 1	·	1.2 km	MPC · JPL
515897	2015 PV_{62}	—	July 2, 2011	Mount Lemmon	Mount Lemmon Survey	·	1.0 km	MPC · JPL
515898	2015 PM_{68}	—	July 24, 1995	Kitt Peak	Spacewatch	·	1.0 km	MPC · JPL
515899	2015 PH_{74}	—	March 28, 2004	Kitt Peak	Spacewatch	·	700 m	MPC · JPL
515900	2015 PE_{80}	—	April 24, 2000	Kitt Peak	Spacewatch	MAS	850 m	MPC · JPL

== 515901–516000 ==
back to top

Designation			Discovery			Properties		Ref
Permanent	Provisional	Named after	Date	Site	Discoverer(s)	Category	Diam.	Ref
515901	2015 PQ_{94}	—	September 27, 2006	Kitt Peak	Spacewatch	KOR	1.2 km	MPC · JPL
515902	2015 PE_{98}	—	April 28, 2011	Kitt Peak	Spacewatch	V	640 m	MPC · JPL
515903	2015 PC_{125}	—	March 11, 2007	Kitt Peak	Spacewatch	·	920 m	MPC · JPL
515904	2015 PX_{126}	—	September 11, 2004	Kitt Peak	Spacewatch	NYS	1.0 km	MPC · JPL
515905	2015 PB_{133}	—	May 8, 2011	Kitt Peak	Spacewatch	V	560 m	MPC · JPL
515906	2015 PD_{169}	—	March 12, 2007	Mount Lemmon	Mount Lemmon Survey	·	860 m	MPC · JPL
515907	2015 PA_{170}	—	October 7, 2008	Kitt Peak	Spacewatch	NYS	1.0 km	MPC · JPL
515908	2015 PW_{180}	—	March 5, 2013	Haleakala	Pan-STARRS 1	EOS	1.4 km	MPC · JPL
515909	2015 PM_{190}	—	September 14, 2007	Mount Lemmon	Mount Lemmon Survey	·	1.1 km	MPC · JPL
515910	2015 PT_{257}	—	September 7, 2004	Kitt Peak	Spacewatch	NYS	1.1 km	MPC · JPL
515911	2015 PB_{290}	—	June 9, 2010	WISE	WISE	NAE	2.2 km	MPC · JPL
515912	2015 PQ_{293}	—	September 4, 2011	Haleakala	Pan-STARRS 1	·	1.3 km	MPC · JPL
515913	2015 PE_{294}	—	January 1, 2009	Kitt Peak	Spacewatch	·	1.3 km	MPC · JPL
515914	2015 PU_{299}	—	October 19, 2011	Haleakala	Pan-STARRS 1	·	1.5 km	MPC · JPL
515915	2015 PW_{302}	—	February 9, 2007	Catalina	CSS	·	2.0 km	MPC · JPL
515916	2015 PZ_{302}	—	January 9, 2006	Kitt Peak	Spacewatch	·	3.3 km	MPC · JPL
515917	2015 PG_{311}	—	November 9, 2008	Mount Lemmon	Mount Lemmon Survey	·	1.1 km	MPC · JPL
515918	2015 PP_{311}	—	November 17, 2006	Kitt Peak	Spacewatch	·	2.1 km	MPC · JPL
515919	2015 PQ_{314}	—	January 11, 2008	Mount Lemmon	Mount Lemmon Survey	·	2.0 km	MPC · JPL
515920	2015 PU_{314}	—	October 2, 2006	Mount Lemmon	Mount Lemmon Survey	·	1.9 km	MPC · JPL
515921	2015 PC_{315}	—	September 25, 2007	Mount Lemmon	Mount Lemmon Survey	·	1.5 km	MPC · JPL
515922	2015 PM_{315}	—	January 9, 2013	Mount Lemmon	Mount Lemmon Survey	·	1.6 km	MPC · JPL
515923	2015 QA_{3}	—	May 3, 2003	Kitt Peak	Spacewatch	·	1.2 km	MPC · JPL
515924	2015 QV_{4}	—	October 31, 2006	Mount Lemmon	Mount Lemmon Survey	KOR	1.6 km	MPC · JPL
515925	2015 QX_{10}	—	June 3, 2011	Mount Lemmon	Mount Lemmon Survey	PHO	1.3 km	MPC · JPL
515926	2015 QS_{12}	—	February 4, 2005	Mount Lemmon	Mount Lemmon Survey	·	1.3 km	MPC · JPL
515927	2015 QZ_{12}	—	October 25, 2005	Mount Lemmon	Mount Lemmon Survey	EOS	1.5 km	MPC · JPL
515928	2015 QE_{13}	—	February 15, 2013	Haleakala	Pan-STARRS 1	·	1.6 km	MPC · JPL
515929	2015 QJ_{13}	—	February 3, 2012	Haleakala	Pan-STARRS 1	·	2.2 km	MPC · JPL
515930	2015 QR_{13}	—	January 23, 2012	Catalina	CSS	·	4.3 km	MPC · JPL
515931	2015 QW_{13}	—	March 13, 2008	Mount Lemmon	Mount Lemmon Survey	·	1.9 km	MPC · JPL
515932	2015 RG_{1}	—	June 24, 2010	Mount Lemmon	Mount Lemmon Survey	·	2.6 km	MPC · JPL
515933	2015 RC_{3}	—	March 2, 2009	Mount Lemmon	Mount Lemmon Survey	TIN	900 m	MPC · JPL
515934	2015 RE_{14}	—	October 10, 2010	Mount Lemmon	Mount Lemmon Survey	·	2.4 km	MPC · JPL
515935	2015 RB_{15}	—	September 3, 2008	Kitt Peak	Spacewatch	·	780 m	MPC · JPL
515936	2015 RA_{23}	—	November 9, 1999	Kitt Peak	Spacewatch	·	2.3 km	MPC · JPL
515937	2015 RF_{24}	—	February 17, 2007	Kitt Peak	Spacewatch	·	2.7 km	MPC · JPL
515938	2015 RV_{25}	—	October 2, 2006	Mount Lemmon	Mount Lemmon Survey	·	1.8 km	MPC · JPL
515939	2015 RY_{26}	—	October 9, 1999	Socorro	LINEAR	·	3.0 km	MPC · JPL
515940	2015 RG_{27}	—	July 21, 2010	WISE	WISE	·	1.6 km	MPC · JPL
515941	2015 RJ_{27}	—	September 20, 2009	Mount Lemmon	Mount Lemmon Survey	·	3.5 km	MPC · JPL
515942	2015 RW_{29}	—	September 12, 2004	Socorro	LINEAR	·	3.8 km	MPC · JPL
515943	2015 RX_{29}	—	July 9, 2011	Haleakala	Pan-STARRS 1	·	1.7 km	MPC · JPL
515944	2015 RD_{30}	—	May 28, 2011	Mount Lemmon	Mount Lemmon Survey	·	1.3 km	MPC · JPL
515945	2015 RY_{34}	—	March 9, 2005	Kitt Peak	Spacewatch	·	1.6 km	MPC · JPL
515946	2015 RG_{43}	—	April 26, 2003	Kitt Peak	Spacewatch	MAS	620 m	MPC · JPL
515947	2015 RX_{47}	—	March 6, 2013	Haleakala	Pan-STARRS 1	·	2.0 km	MPC · JPL
515948	2015 RO_{56}	—	October 7, 2004	Kitt Peak	Spacewatch	HYG	2.9 km	MPC · JPL
515949	2015 RG_{58}	—	September 11, 2005	Kitt Peak	Spacewatch	KOR	1.3 km	MPC · JPL
515950	2015 RN_{60}	—	August 10, 2010	Kitt Peak	Spacewatch	KOR	1.1 km	MPC · JPL
515951	2015 RY_{64}	—	September 22, 2004	Kitt Peak	Spacewatch	·	2.2 km	MPC · JPL
515952	2015 RL_{65}	—	August 30, 2005	Kitt Peak	Spacewatch	KOR	1.4 km	MPC · JPL
515953	2015 RB_{73}	—	March 1, 1998	Kitt Peak	Spacewatch	·	2.1 km	MPC · JPL
515954	2015 RO_{74}	—	September 18, 2010	Mount Lemmon	Mount Lemmon Survey	KOR	1.2 km	MPC · JPL
515955	2015 RP_{77}	—	March 5, 2008	Mount Lemmon	Mount Lemmon Survey	·	1.7 km	MPC · JPL
515956	2015 RT_{77}	—	February 16, 2012	Haleakala	Pan-STARRS 1	LUT	3.2 km	MPC · JPL
515957	2015 RJ_{78}	—	September 26, 2006	Kitt Peak	Spacewatch	·	1.7 km	MPC · JPL
515958	2015 RB_{79}	—	October 22, 2005	Kitt Peak	Spacewatch	·	1.6 km	MPC · JPL
515959	2015 RK_{85}	—	September 21, 2011	Haleakala	Pan-STARRS 1	·	1.3 km	MPC · JPL
515960	2015 RL_{90}	—	January 23, 2006	Kitt Peak	Spacewatch	·	2.8 km	MPC · JPL
515961	2015 RO_{93}	—	September 21, 2008	Kitt Peak	Spacewatch	·	950 m	MPC · JPL
515962	2015 RR_{93}	—	March 13, 2007	Mount Lemmon	Mount Lemmon Survey	·	1.2 km	MPC · JPL
515963	2015 RG_{99}	—	September 9, 2004	Socorro	LINEAR	·	1.0 km	MPC · JPL
515964	2015 RF_{101}	—	January 30, 2012	Mount Lemmon	Mount Lemmon Survey	·	3.7 km	MPC · JPL
515965	2015 RG_{101}	—	February 26, 2007	Mount Lemmon	Mount Lemmon Survey	·	4.3 km	MPC · JPL
515966	2015 RG_{104}	—	June 20, 2010	Mount Lemmon	Mount Lemmon Survey	·	2.1 km	MPC · JPL
515967	2015 RH_{106}	—	September 15, 2004	Kitt Peak	Spacewatch	EOS	2.2 km	MPC · JPL
515968	2015 RZ_{106}	—	September 5, 2007	Mount Lemmon	Mount Lemmon Survey	T_{j} (2.98)	3.6 km	MPC · JPL
515969	2015 RD_{107}	—	September 2, 2010	Mount Lemmon	Mount Lemmon Survey	·	1.8 km	MPC · JPL
515970	2015 RA_{109}	—	March 26, 2007	Kitt Peak	Spacewatch	·	3.4 km	MPC · JPL
515971	2015 RU_{114}	—	March 4, 2008	Kitt Peak	Spacewatch	BRA	1.4 km	MPC · JPL
515972	2015 RM_{118}	—	November 4, 2004	Catalina	CSS	·	3.4 km	MPC · JPL
515973	2015 RE_{119}	—	April 7, 2008	Kitt Peak	Spacewatch	·	3.0 km	MPC · JPL
515974	2015 RT_{138}	—	January 10, 2007	Mount Lemmon	Mount Lemmon Survey	·	1.7 km	MPC · JPL
515975	2015 RY_{141}	—	October 15, 2004	Kitt Peak	Spacewatch	·	2.3 km	MPC · JPL
515976	2015 RF_{146}	—	March 4, 2014	Haleakala	Pan-STARRS 1	·	1.4 km	MPC · JPL
515977	2015 RT_{182}	—	November 24, 2011	Haleakala	Pan-STARRS 1	·	1.5 km	MPC · JPL
515978	2015 RJ_{185}	—	October 2, 2006	Mount Lemmon	Mount Lemmon Survey	·	1.7 km	MPC · JPL
515979	2015 RN_{185}	—	October 12, 2005	Kitt Peak	Spacewatch	KOR	1.1 km	MPC · JPL
515980	2015 RE_{186}	—	May 28, 2008	Kitt Peak	Spacewatch	EOS	1.6 km	MPC · JPL
515981	2015 RV_{191}	—	December 31, 2007	Mount Lemmon	Mount Lemmon Survey	AGN	1.1 km	MPC · JPL
515982	2015 RG_{192}	—	August 29, 2006	Kitt Peak	Spacewatch	·	1.6 km	MPC · JPL
515983	2015 RT_{195}	—	November 18, 2008	Kitt Peak	Spacewatch	·	1.5 km	MPC · JPL
515984	2015 RR_{198}	—	August 12, 2015	Haleakala	Pan-STARRS 1	·	1.8 km	MPC · JPL
515985	2015 RH_{199}	—	March 19, 2013	Haleakala	Pan-STARRS 1	·	2.1 km	MPC · JPL
515986	2015 RJ_{199}	—	January 22, 2006	Mount Lemmon	Mount Lemmon Survey	·	2.3 km	MPC · JPL
515987	2015 RH_{200}	—	April 18, 2007	Kitt Peak	Spacewatch	·	2.4 km	MPC · JPL
515988	2015 RN_{205}	—	September 28, 2006	Kitt Peak	Spacewatch	·	1.5 km	MPC · JPL
515989	2015 RW_{207}	—	September 11, 2015	Haleakala	Pan-STARRS 1	·	3.4 km	MPC · JPL
515990	2015 RC_{208}	—	August 12, 2015	Haleakala	Pan-STARRS 1	BRA	1.5 km	MPC · JPL
515991	2015 RC_{209}	—	October 12, 2004	Kitt Peak	Spacewatch	·	3.0 km	MPC · JPL
515992	2015 RX_{210}	—	August 25, 2004	Kitt Peak	Spacewatch	·	2.6 km	MPC · JPL
515993	2015 RE_{218}	—	May 2, 2008	Mount Lemmon	Mount Lemmon Survey	·	2.0 km	MPC · JPL
515994	2015 RS_{218}	—	February 26, 2007	Mount Lemmon	Mount Lemmon Survey	·	3.0 km	MPC · JPL
515995	2015 RY_{222}	—	October 1, 2005	Mount Lemmon	Mount Lemmon Survey	KOR	1.1 km	MPC · JPL
515996	2015 RN_{227}	—	November 30, 2010	Mount Lemmon	Mount Lemmon Survey	·	3.2 km	MPC · JPL
515997	2015 RP_{233}	—	October 31, 2010	Mount Lemmon	Mount Lemmon Survey	·	1.9 km	MPC · JPL
515998	2015 RW_{233}	—	July 7, 2014	Haleakala	Pan-STARRS 1	·	2.4 km	MPC · JPL
515999	2015 RC_{234}	—	September 15, 2004	Kitt Peak	Spacewatch	·	2.2 km	MPC · JPL
516000	2015 RK_{239}	—	June 1, 2006	Kitt Peak	Spacewatch	JUN	1.1 km	MPC · JPL

back to top

== Meaning of names ==
As minor planet discoveries are confirmed, they are given a permanent number by the IAU's Minor Planet Center (MPC), and the discoverers can then submit names for them, following the IAU's naming conventions. The list below concerns those minor planets in the specified number-range that have received names, and explains the meanings of those names.

Official naming citations of newly named small Solar System bodies are approved and published in a bulletin by IAU's Working Group for Small Bodies Nomenclature (WGSBN). Before May 2021, citations were published in MPC's Minor Planet Circulars for many decades. Recent citations can also be found on the JPL Small-Body Database (SBDB). Until his death in 2016, German astronomer Lutz D. Schmadel compiled these citations into the Dictionary of Minor Planet Names (DMP) and regularly updated the collection.

Based on Paul Herget's The Names of the Minor Planets, Schmadel also researched the unclear origin of numerous asteroids, most of which had been named prior to World War II. This article incorporates text from this source, which is in the public domain: SBDB New namings may only be added to this list below after official publication as the preannouncement of names is condemned. The WGSBN publishes a comprehensive guideline for the naming rules of non-cometary small Solar System bodies.

Named minor planet	Provisional	This minor planet was named for...	Ref · Catalog
515812 Pueo	2015 ME_{52}	Pueo, a subspecies of the short-eared owl	IAU · 515812
