= Kelly Fast =

American Scientist

Kelly E. Fast
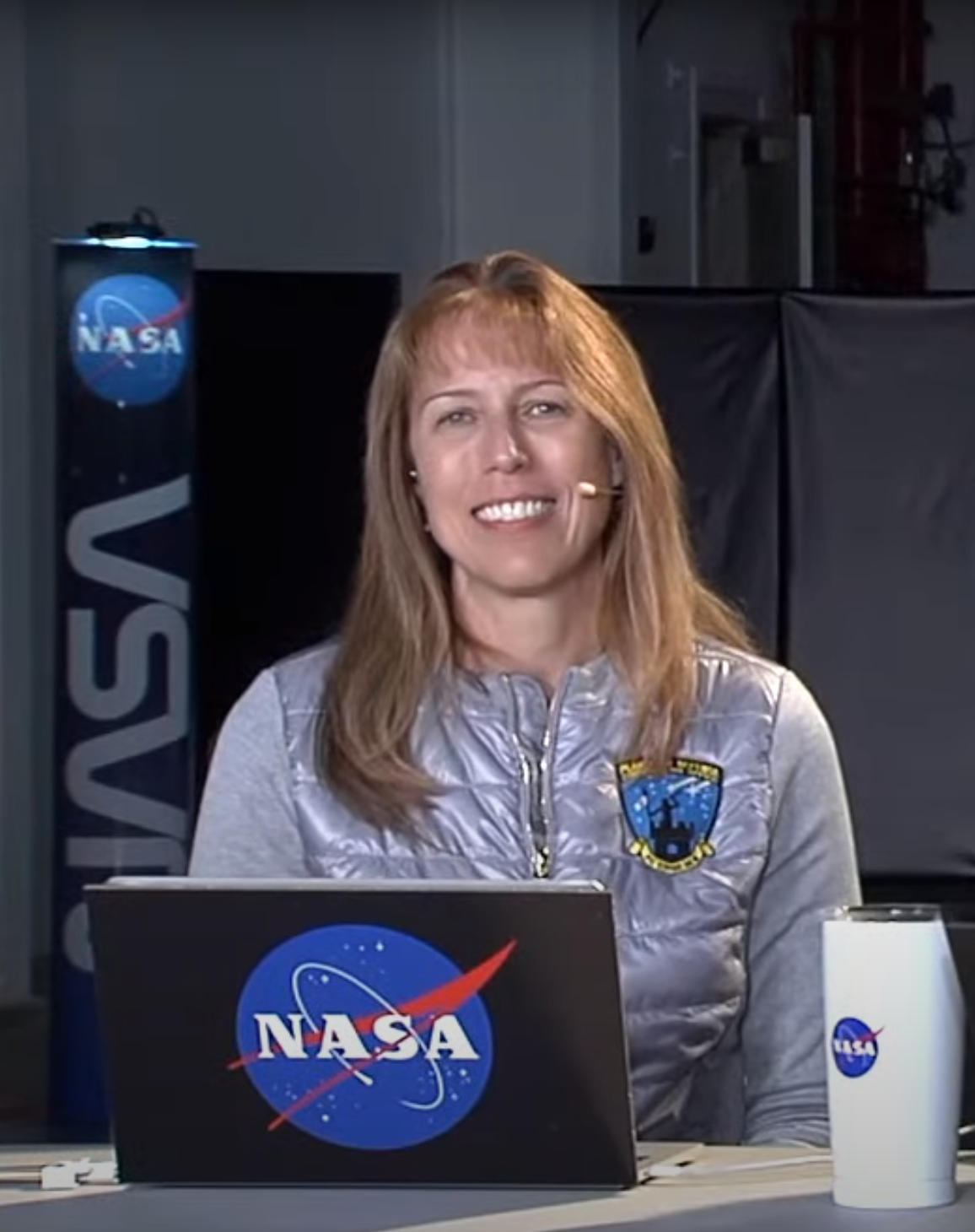
- Fast co-hosting NASA's launch coverage of the agency's DART mission.
- Born: Los Angeles
- Education: University of Maryland, College Park; University of California, Los Angeles
- Scientific career
- Institutions: NASA Headquarters; Goddard Space Flight Center

Kelly E. Fast is an American astronomer, program scientist, and science communicator who currently serves as the Acting NASA Planetary Defense Officer, the Program Manager for NASA’s Near-Earth Object Observations program, the Program Scientist for the NASA Infrared Telescope Facility (IRTF), and the Program Officer for NASA’s Yearly Opportunities for Research in Planetary Defense (YORPD) research solicitation. The portfolio Fast oversees is part of NASA’s Planetary Defense Coordination Office, which manages asteroid impact avoidance activities across NASA and coordinates U.S. interagency and international efforts to study and plan a response to the asteroid impact hazard. In 2003, main belt asteroid 115434 (2003 TU2) was renamed “Kellyfast” in honor of her contributions to planetary science.

== Early life and education ==
Fast grew up in Southern California with views of both the Hollywood Sign and the Griffith Observatory outside her bedroom window. In the end, the observatory won her heart, and she often preferred spending her weekends exploring the Los Angeles skies with her telescope. Fast’s passion for astronomy and space-themed TV shows led her to pursue a B.S. in Astrophysics from the University of California, Los Angeles, and she later attended the University of Maryland, College Park where she earned both a M.S. and Ph.D. in Astronomy.

== Career ==
Fast began her NASA career working as a research astronomer at Goddard Space Flight Center where she worked with high-resolution infrared instrumentation on telescopes to study planetary atmospheres. While at Godard, Fast also researched the atmospheric chemistry of Mars, the atmospheric dynamics of Titan, the 1994 impact of Comet Shoemaker-Levy 9 with Jupiter, and the effects of the 2009 Jupiter impact event. During her Goddard tenure, Fast also regularly visited NASA’s IRTF on Mauna Kea, Hawaii as a visiting astronomer, and she was later appointed to the Joint Management Operations Working Group for the IRTF and for NASA’s participation at the W. M. Keck Observatory.

In 2011, Fast moved to NASA Headquarters in Washington, D.C. where she served as a Discipline Scientist for the Planetary Atmospheres program, the Planetary Astronomy program, and the Solar System Observations program. Fast also served as the NASA HQ Program Scientist for the MAVEN Mars orbiter before assuming her current role as NASA’s Near-Earth Object Observations Program Manager in the agency’s Planetary Defense Coordination Office.

== Film and television ==
Fast’s science career has led her to appear as a subject matter expert in several films and television shows including the Neil deGrasse Tyson show StarTalk, the IMAX film Asteroid Hunters, and the Apple TV documentary Fireball: Visitors from Darker Worlds. In 2021, she co-hosted NASA’s live launch coverage of the agency’s Double Asteroid Redirection Test (DART) mission.

== Research publications ==
- Fast, Kelly E: Astrophysics Data System
