= LICIACube =

Italian cubesat aboard DART spacecraft (2022)

Light Italian Cubesat for Imaging of Asteroids (LICIACube)
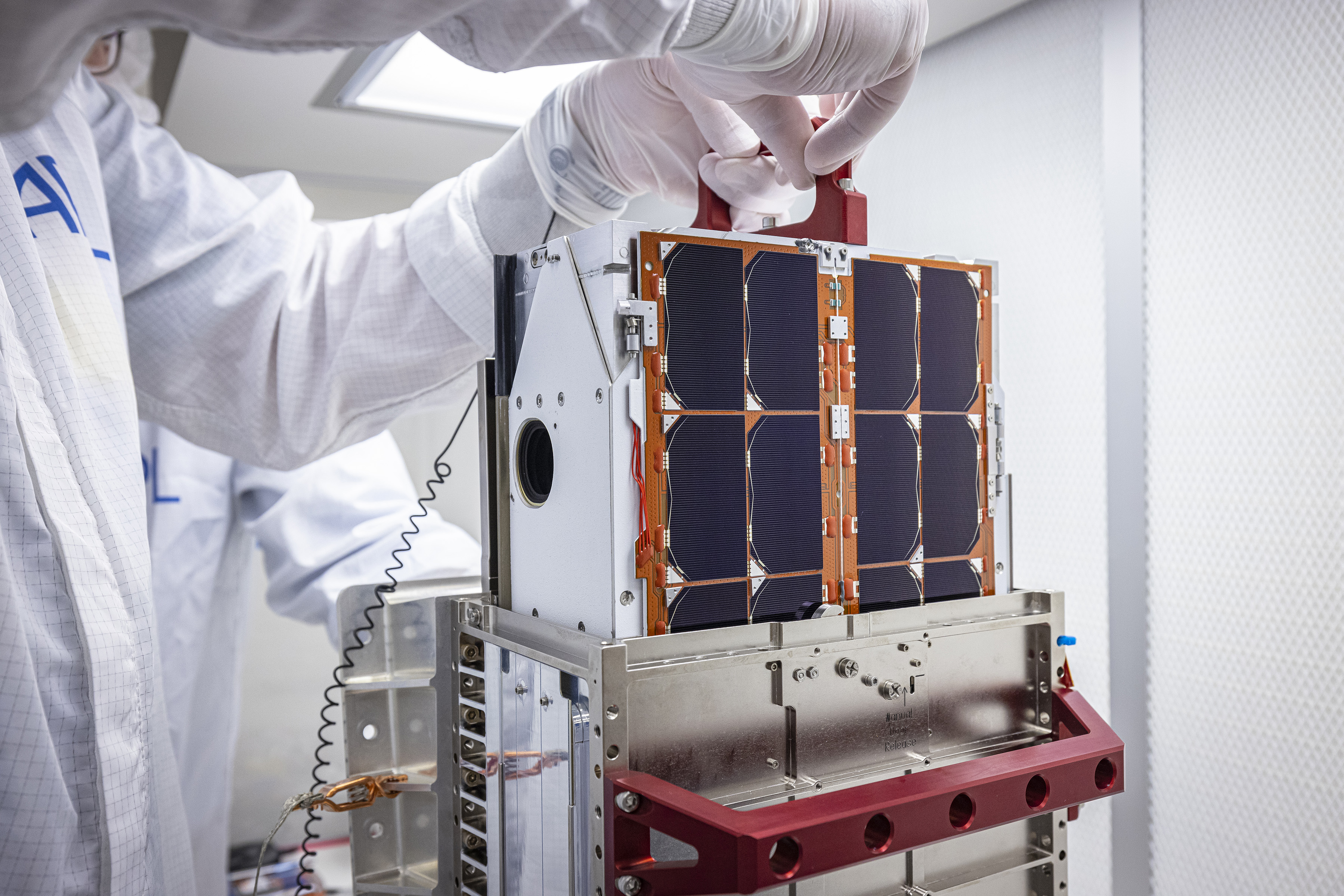
- LICIACube at the Applied Physics Laboratory in August 2021
- Mission type: Didymos flyby
- Operator: Italian Space Agency
- COSPAR ID: 2021-110C
- SATCAT no.: none
- Mission duration: ~6 months (planned); 334 days (total)

Spacecraft properties
- Bus: 6U CubeSat
- Manufacturer: Argotec
- Launch mass: 14 kg (31 lb)
- Dimensions: 10 × 20 × 30 cm (3.9 × 7.9 × 11.8 in)
- Power: Solar array × 2

Start of mission
- Launch date: 24 November 2021, 06:21:02 UTC
- Rocket: Falcon 9 Block 5, B1063.3
- Launch site: Vandenberg SLC-4E
- Deployed from: DART
- Deployment date: 11 September 2022, 23:14 UTC

End of mission
- Disposal: Spacecraft failure
- Declared: 23 December 2022
- Last contact: 24 October 2022

Orbital parameters
- Reference system: Heliocentric
- Semi-major axis: 1.0018 AU (149,870,000 km)
- Eccentricity: 0.06497
- Perihelion altitude: 0.9368 AU (140,140,000 km)
- Aphelion altitude: 1.0669 AU (159,610,000 km)
- Inclination: 3.8196°
- Period: 366.27 days
- RAAN: 60.858°
- Argument of perihelion: 79.427°
- Mean anomaly: 230.05°
- Epoch: 27 September 2022

Flyby of Didymos system
- Closest approach: 26 September 2022, 23:17 UTC
- Distance: 56.7 km (35.2 mi)
Instruments
- LEIA: LICIACube Explorer Imaging for Asteroid
- LUKE: LICIACube Unit Key Explorer

Light Italian CubeSat for Imaging of Asteroids (LICIACube, /ˈliːtʃiəˌkjuːb/) is a six-unit CubeSat of the Italian Space Agency (ASI). LICIACube is a part of the Double Asteroid Redirection Test (DART) mission and carries out observational analysis of the Didymos asteroid binary system after DART's impact on Dimorphos. It communicates directly with Earth, sending back images of the ejecta and plume of DART's impact as well as having done asteroidal study during its flyby of the Didymos system from a distance of 56.7 km (35.2 mi), 165 seconds after DART's impact. LICIACube is the first purely Italian autonomous spacecraft in deep space. Data archiving and processing is managed by the Mission Control Center of Argotec. Its mission ended in the autumn of 2022.

== History ==
LICIACube is the first deep space mission developed and autonomously managed by an Italian team. To collaborate upon the design, integration, and testing of the CubeSat, the Italian Space Agency selected the aerospace company Argotec, while the LICIACube GS has a complex architecture based on a mission control center in Turin hosted by Argotec and science operation center in Rome. Antennas of the NASA Deep Space Network (NASA DSN) and data archiving and processing is managed at the ASI SSDC. The scientific team making this cubesat is led by National Institute of Astrophysics INAF (OAR, IAPS, OAA, OAPd, OATs) with the support of IFAC-CNR and Parthenope University of Naples. The team is supported by the University of Bologna for orbit determination and satellite navigation and the Polytechnic University of Milan, for mission analysis and optimisation. The LICIACube team includes the wider Italian scientific community involved in the definition of all the aspects of the mission: trajectory design; mission definition (and real-time orbit determination during operations); impact, plume and imaging simulation, and modelling, in preparation of a suitable framework for the analysis and interpretation of in situ data. Major technological challenges during the mission (autonomous targeting and imaging of such a small body during a fast flyby with the limited resources of a CubeSat) is affordable thanks to cooperation between the mentioned teams in support of the engineering tasks.

== Satellite design ==
In order to deal with the mission, the Argotec platform uses an autonomous attitude control system, two light solar arrays, an integrated propulsion system with thrusters of 50mN thrust and isp of 40s, two cameras, an X-band communication system, and an advanced onboard computer.

== Scientific payload ==
LICIACube is equipped with two optical cameras for conducting asteroidal reconnaissance during flyby, dubbed LEIA (LICIACube Explorer Imaging for Asteroid), a Catadioptric camera, a narrow field of view (FoV) of 2.06°, 25 microradian/pixel, 2048x2048 pixels, monochrome, achieving a best resolution of 1.38 m/pix at closest approach) camera, and LUKE (LICIACube Unit Key Explorer), a wide 5° FoV imaging camera with an RGB Bayer pattern infrared filter. These captured scientific data revealing the composition of the asteroid and provided data for its autonomous system by finding and tracking the asteroid throughout the encounter. As it was released when DART sped up for its intentional impact, it took an image every 6 seconds during DART's impact period. It had preliminary flyby targets including taking 3 high resolution images revealing the asteroid's morphology concentrating on the physics of the asteroid and plume generations after impact. This may help characterise the consequences of the impact.

== Mission profile ==
=== Launch ===
LICIACube was manufactured in Italy and sent to Applied Physics Laboratory (APL) of Johns Hopkins University in September 2021. On 8 September 2021, the LICIACube was integrated into the DART spacecraft for launch on 24 November 2021, at 06:21:02 UTC, inside a spring-loaded box placed on the wall of the DART spacecraft.

=== Goals ===
LICIACube's goals are to:

- Document the effect of DART's impact on the secondary member of the 65803 Didymos binary asteroid system
- Characterise the shape of the target
- Perform dedicated scientific investigations on it

=== Cruise phase and flyby ===
LICIACube Activities Animated clips of LICIACube deployment and subsequent flyby following DART's kinetic impact

After the launch, the Cubesat remained enclosed within a spring-loaded box and piggybacks with the DART spacecraft for almost the entire duration of DART's mission. It separated on 11 September 2022 from DART by being ejected at roughly 4 km/h (1.1 m/s; 2.5 mph) relative to DART, 15 days before impact. After release, as part of the testing process to calibrate the miniature spacecraft and its cameras, LICIACube captured images of a crescent Earth and the Pleiades star cluster, also known as the Seven Sisters.

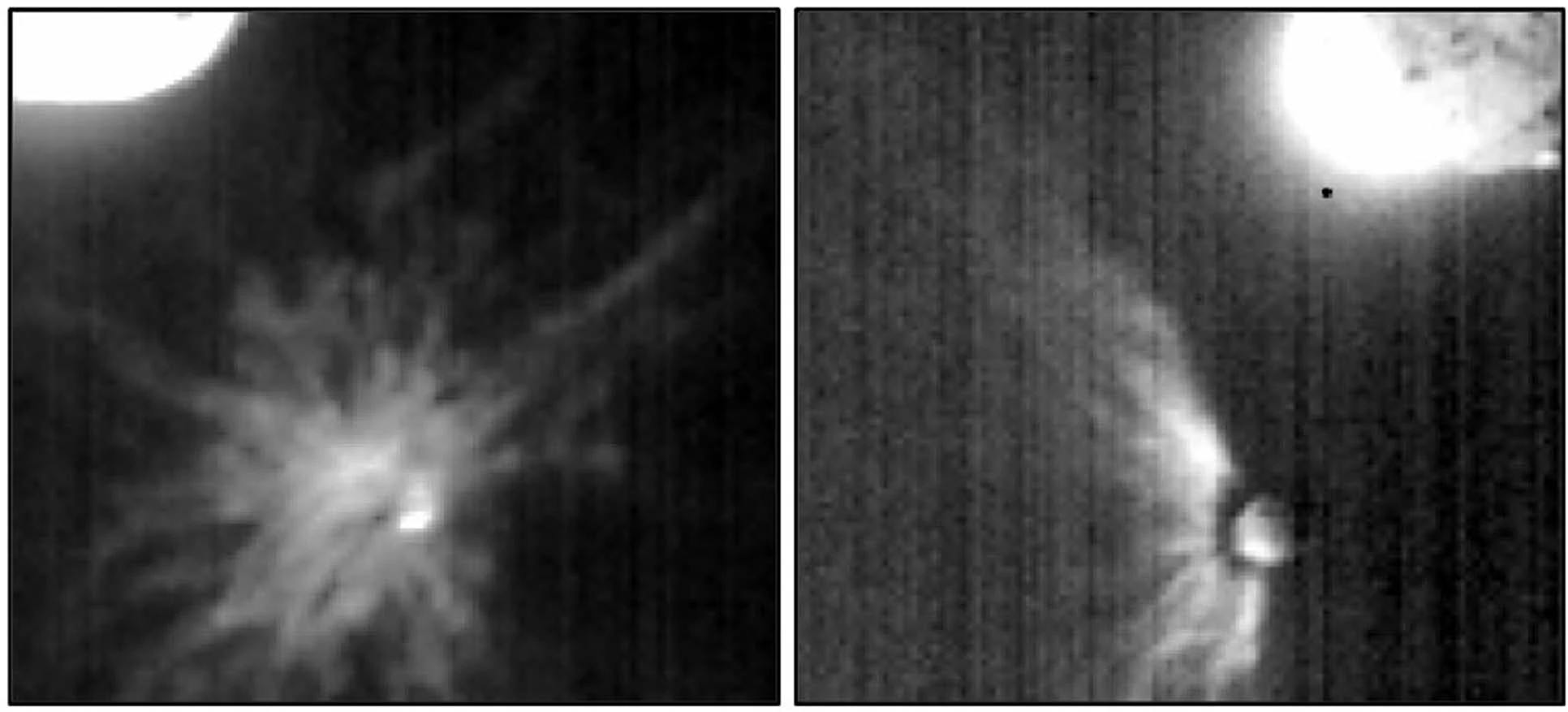
DART impact seen by LICIACube

It conducted 3 orbital manoeuvrers for its final trajectory, which flew it past Dimorphos about 2 minutes 45 seconds after DART’s impact. That slight delay allowed LICIACube to confirm impact, observe the plume’s evolution, potentially capture images of the newly formed impact crater, and view the opposite hemisphere of Dimorphos that DART never saw, while drifting past the asteroid.

=== Mission after flyby ===
After the flyby, the spacecraft spent several weeks downlinking image data. Potential targets were selected for an extended mission, including asteroid 14827 Hypnos (1986 JK) on 3 June 2024. Signal with LICIACube was lost on 24 October 2022. Following unsuccessful attempts to reestablish contact, end of mission was declared on 23 December.

== Results ==
Photo taken by LICIACube of the ejecta from the DART impact.

Several images have been transmitted to Earth showing rays of impact debris streaming from Dimorphos. On 28 September 2022, the first images of the impact from the LICIACube probe were published on a NASA web page.

== Gallery ==
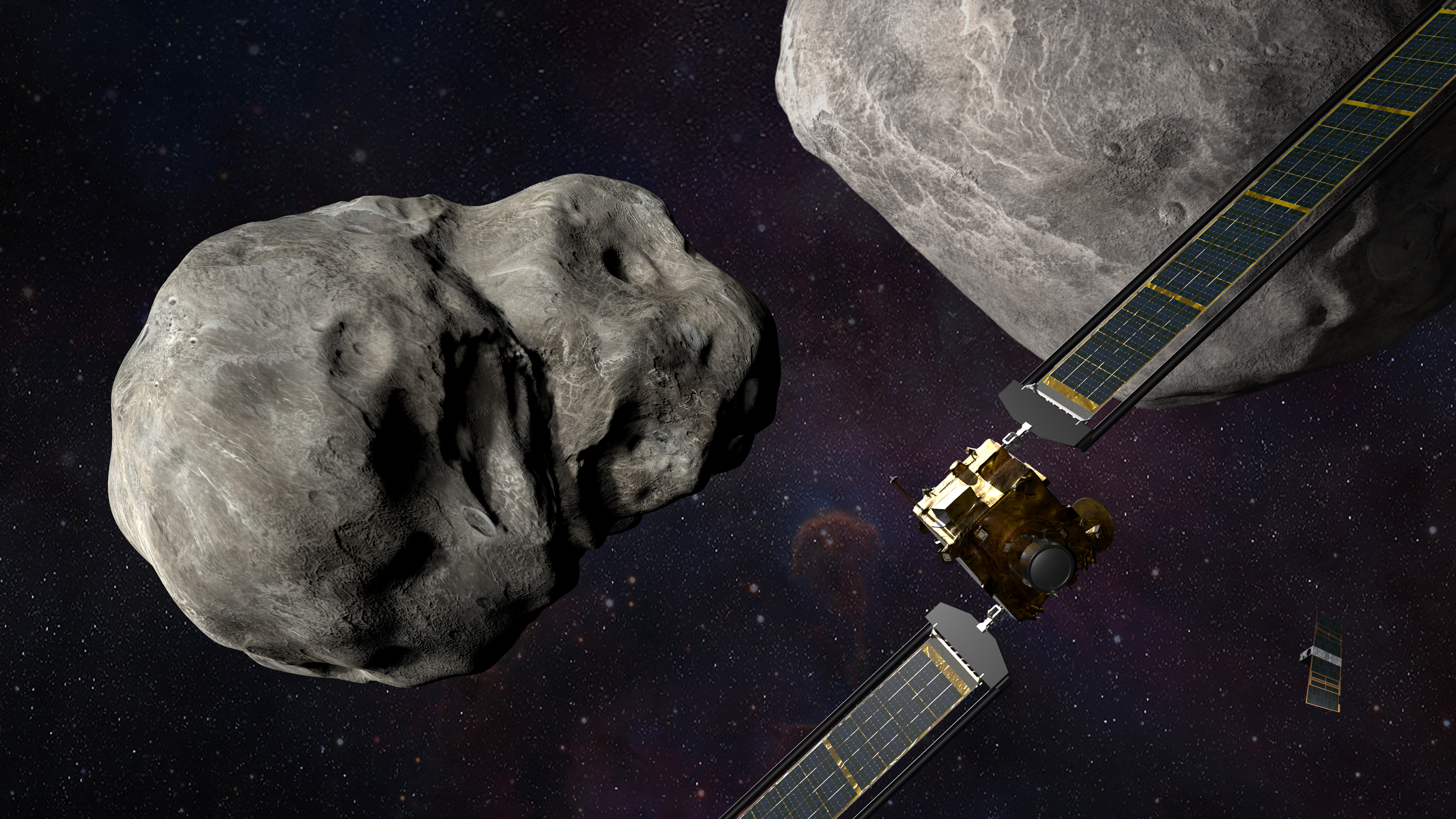
Artist's illustration of DART and LICIACube at the Didymos system

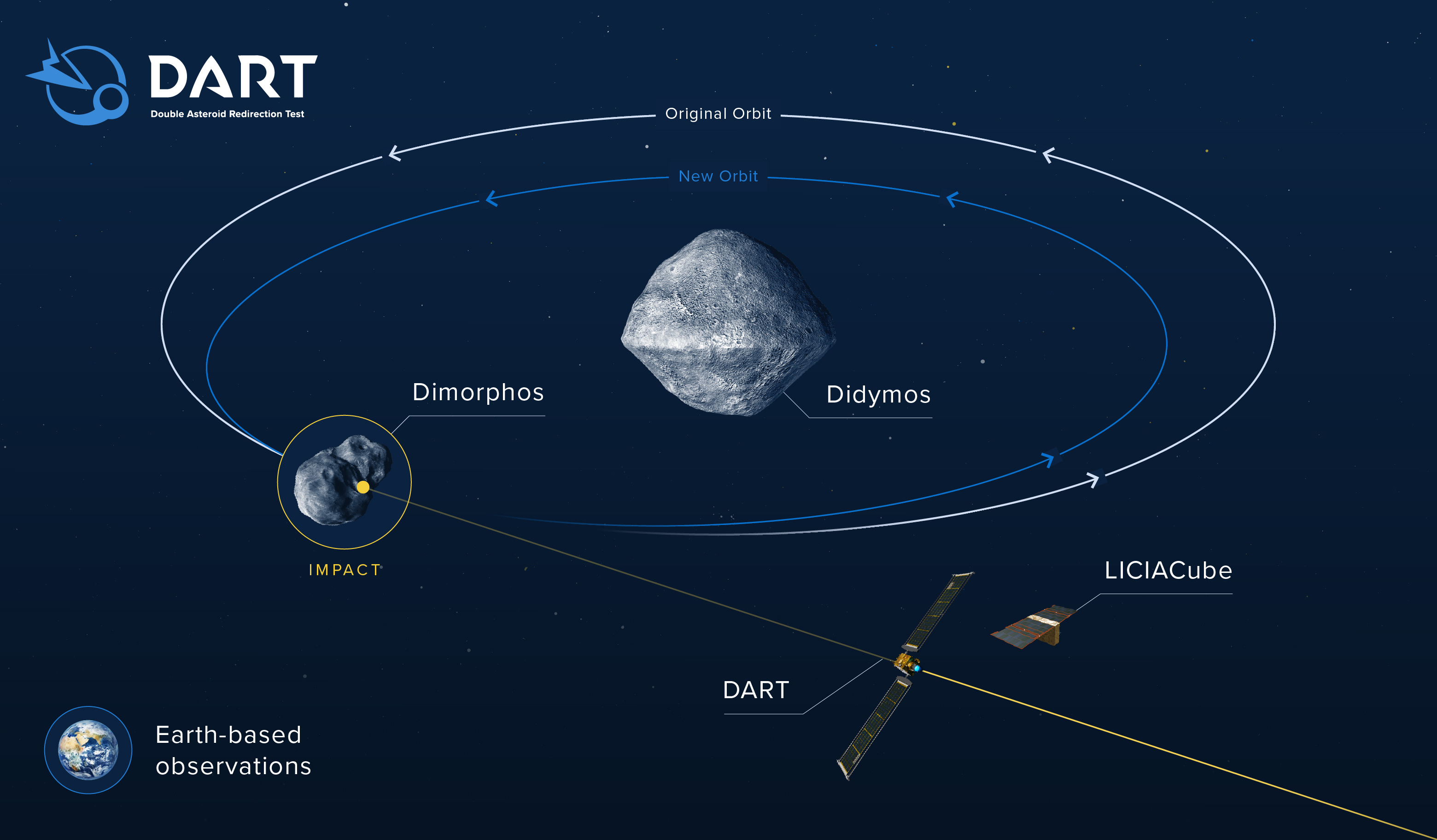
Infographic of the effects of DART's impact on the orbit of Dimorphos and the deployment of LICIACube.

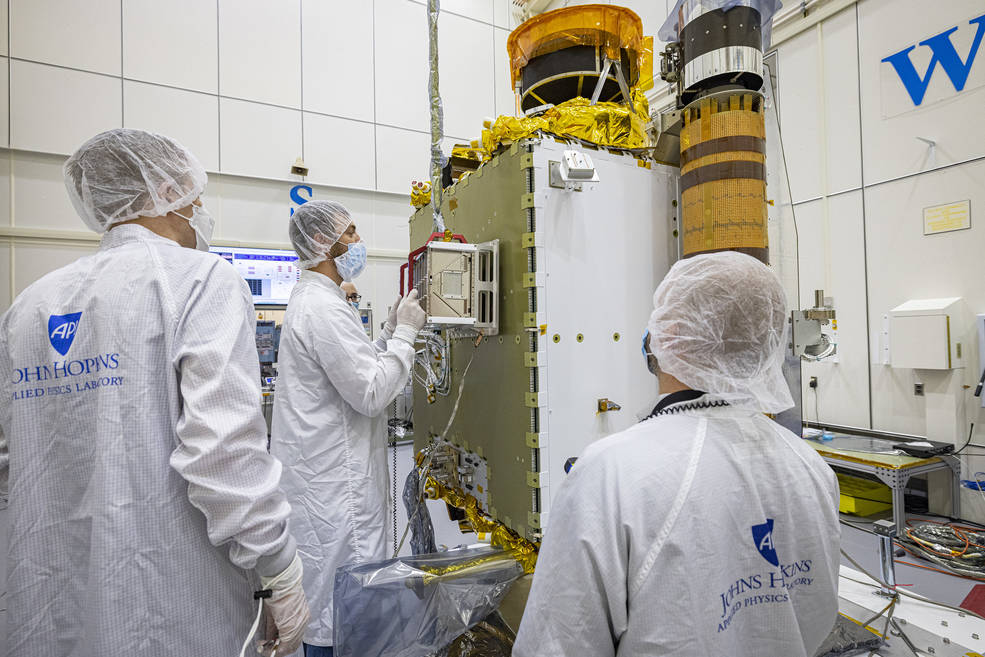
LICIACube CubeSat integrating on DART spacecraft

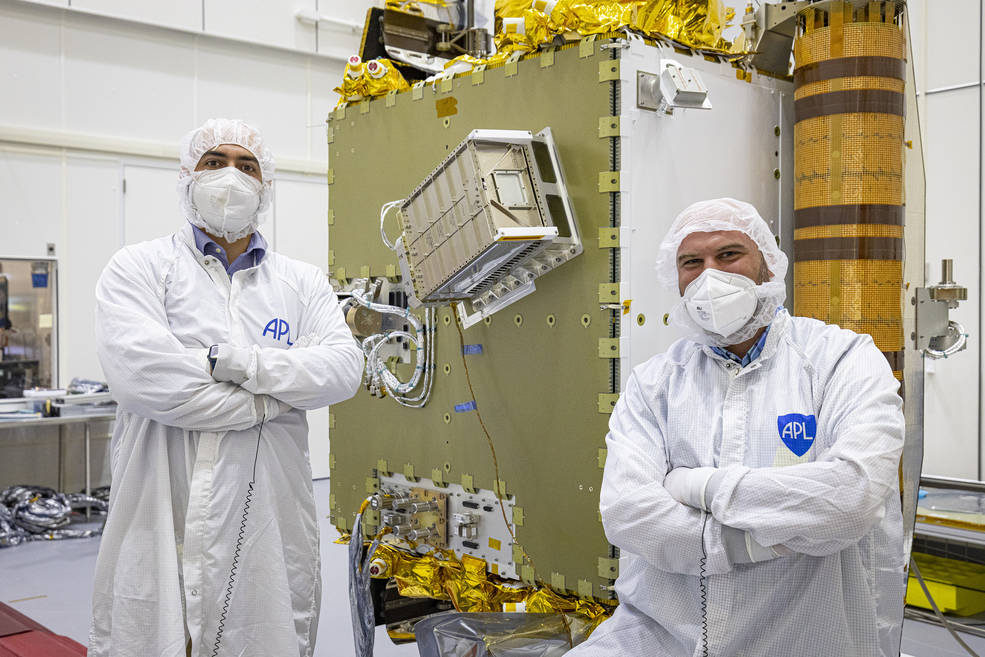
LICIACube CubeSat integrated on DART spacecraft.

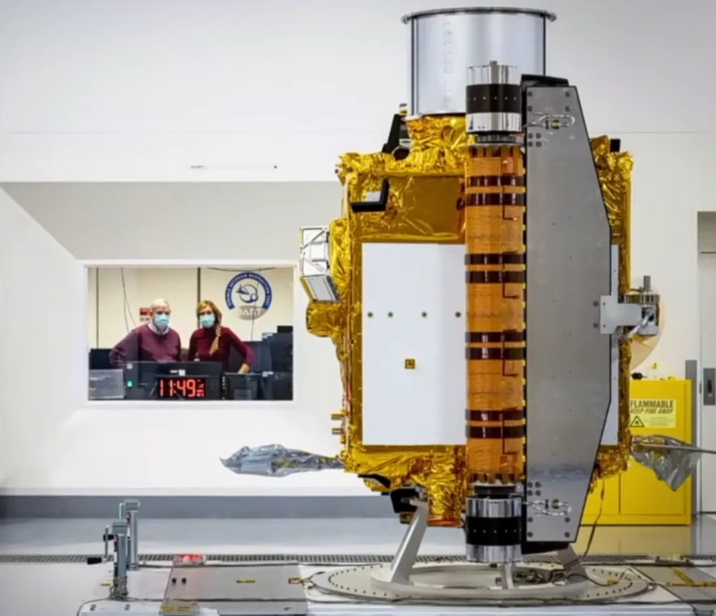
DART spacecraft with LICIACube protruding on centre left

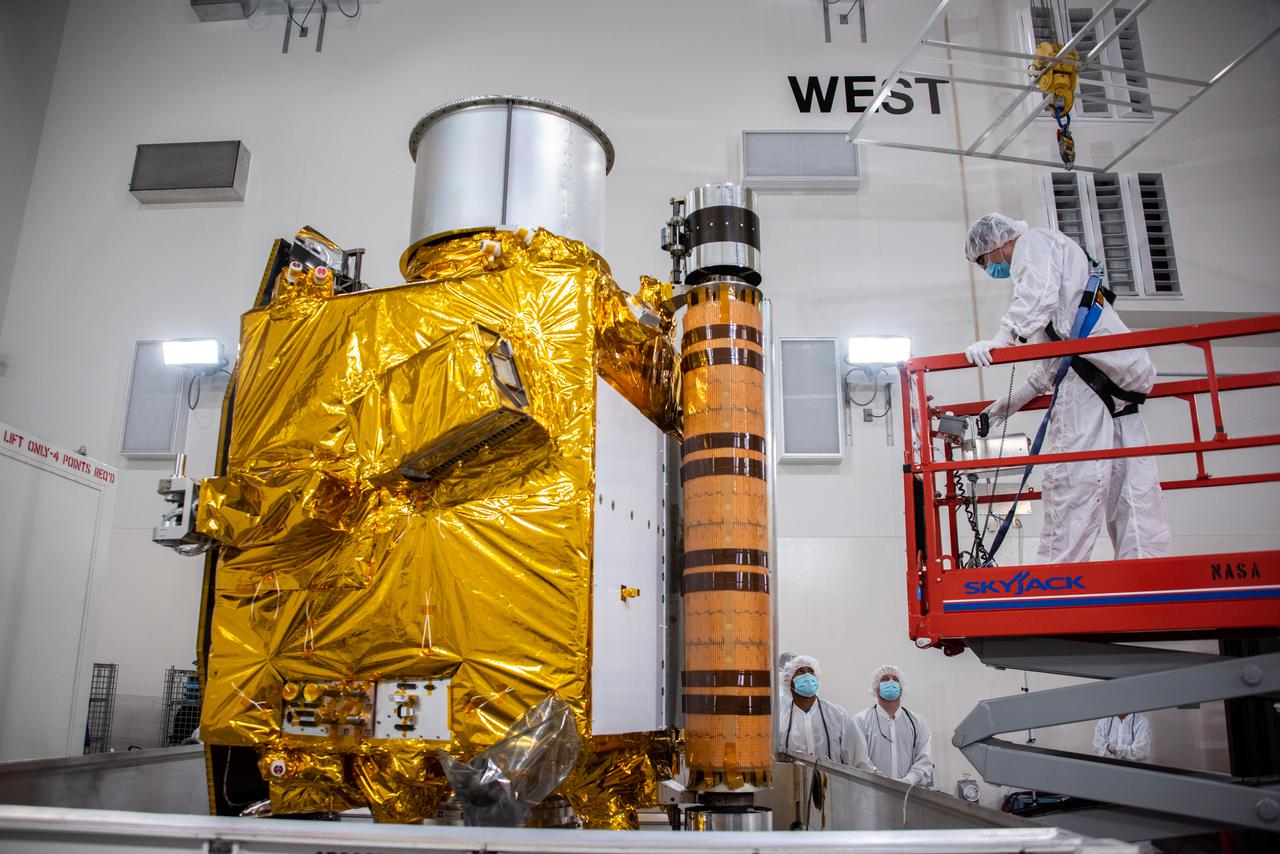
DART mating to payload adapter, LICIACube visible at centre

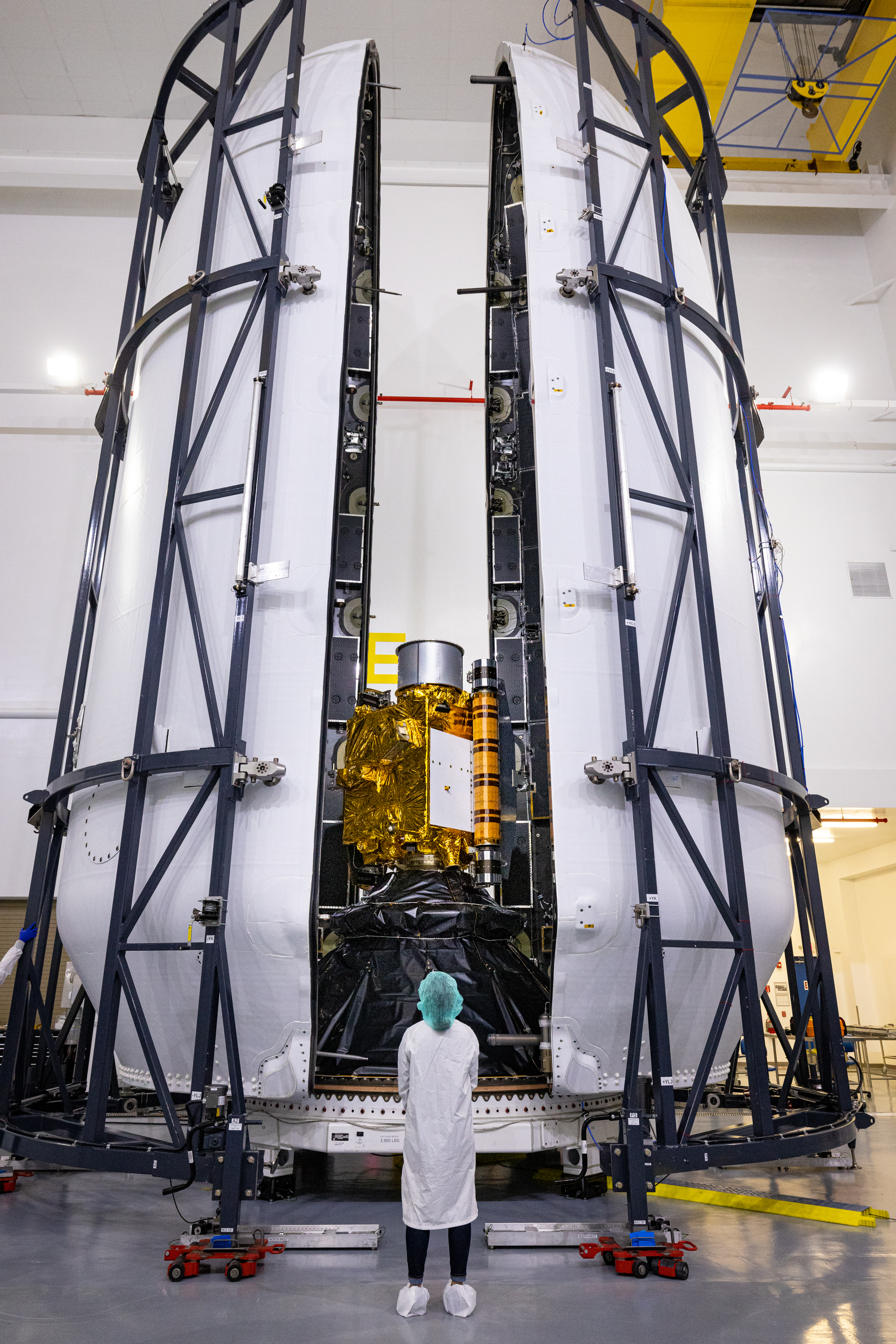
Falcon 9 launch vehicle's payload fairing being attached to NASA's DART spacecraft (LICIACube visible) on 16 November 2021.

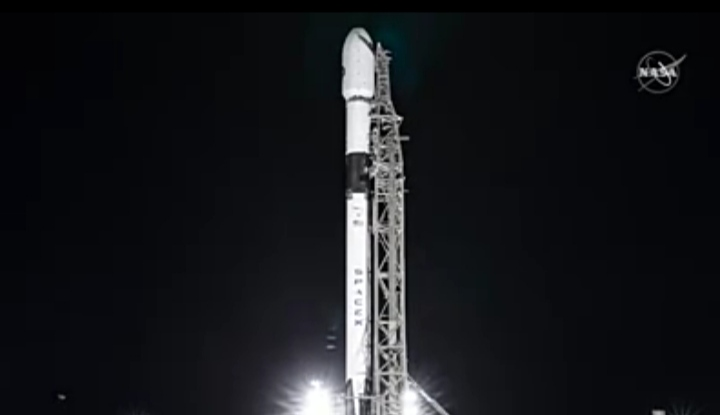
DART vertical at launch pad

== See also ==
- Asteroid impact avoidance – Methods to prevent destructive asteroid hits
- B612 Foundation – Planetary defense nonprofit organization
- Don Quijote (spacecraft) – Space probe concept
- Double Asteroid Redirection Test – 2021 NASA planetary defense mission
- NEO Surveyor – Space-based infrared telescope
- The Spaceguard Foundation – Organization studying near-Earth objects
