= Planetary Defense Coordination Office =

NASA department for avoiding asteroid impacts

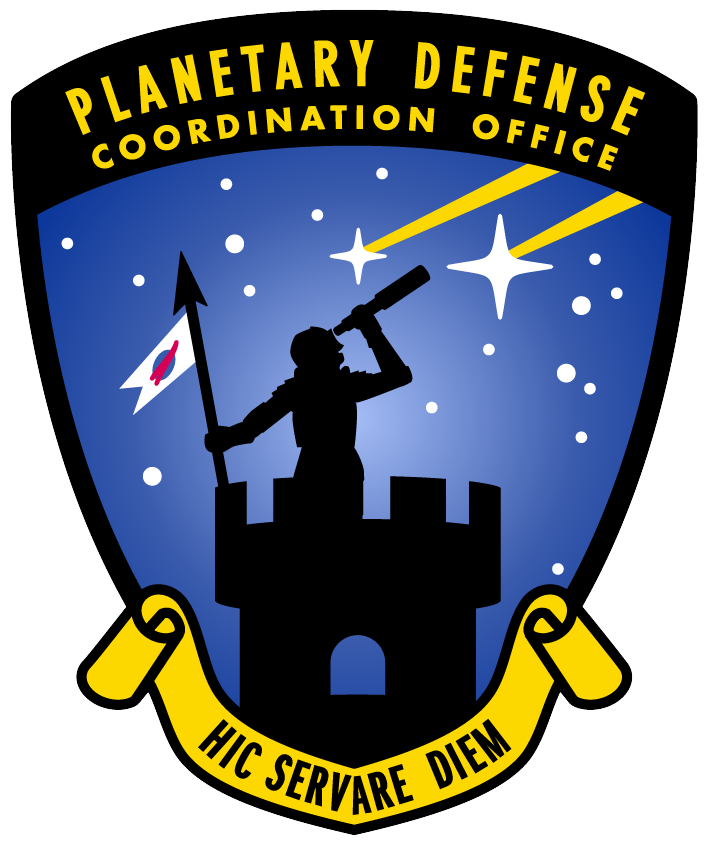

Agency overview
- Formed: January 2016
- Jurisdiction: United States
- Headquarters: Washington, D.C.
- Motto: Hic Servare Diem (Latin) "Here to Save the Day"
- Agency executive: Kelly Fast, Acting Planetary Defense Officer
- Parent department: Science Mission Directorate, Planetary Science Division
- Parent agency: NASA
- Website: nasa.gov/planetarydefense

The Planetary Defense Coordination Office (PDCO) is a planetary defense organization established in January 2016 within NASA's Planetary Science Division of the Science Mission Directorate. It includes a Near Earth Observations Program which funds telescopic searches and orbit calculations.

Its mission is to look for and catalogue near-Earth objects such as comets, asteroids, and potentially hazardous objects that could impact Earth, as well as help the U.S. government prepare for a potential impact event (and coordinate efforts to mitigate and deflect potential threats if one is detected).

NASA is a signatory to the International Asteroid Warning Network, operated by the United Nations Office for Outer Space Affairs.

== History ==
In 2005, the U.S. Congress passed the NASA Authorization Act, which, in part, tasked NASA with finding and cataloguing at least 90% of all near-Earth objects that are 140 meters or larger by 2020. However, that goal was clearly not being met by NASA's Near Earth Object Observations Program, which a 2014 report by the NASA Office of Inspector General pointed out. In June 2015, NASA and National Nuclear Security Administration of the U.S. Department of Energy, which had been studying impact events on their own, signed an agreement to work in cooperation.

In January 2016, NASA officially announced the establishment of the Planetary Defense Coordination Office (PDCO), appointing Lindley Johnson to lead it as Planetary Defense Officer. The PDCO was given the job of cataloging and tracking potentially hazardous near-Earth objects (NEO), such as asteroids and comets, larger than 30–50 meters in diameter (compare to the 20-meter Chelyabinsk meteor that exploded over Russia in 2013) and coordinating an effective threat response and mitigation effort.

It has been a part of several key NASA missions, including OSIRIS-REx, NEOWISE, and Double Asteroid Redirection Test (DART). For NEOWISE, NASA worked with the Jet Propulsion Laboratory, to investigate various impact-threat scenarios in order to learn the best approach to the threat of an incoming impactor. The office would continue to use the polar orbiting infrared telescope NEOWISE, decommissioned in August 2024, to detect any potentially hazardous objects.

Double Asteroid Redirection Test (DART), a joint project between NASA and the Johns Hopkins Applied Physics Laboratory, is the first planetary defense mission of NASA. In November 2021, the DART spacecraft was launched with the goal of seeing if it could "alter an asteroid's path, a technique that may be used to defend the planet in the future". The attempt was successful.

== In popular culture ==
The 1998 twin films Deep Impact and Armageddon tell a fictional story of an asteroid impact event and efforts to avert it through planetary defense operations.

The 2021 movie Don't Look Up is about a "planet killer" comet, in which the Planetary Defense Officer is played by Rob Morgan. PDCO chief Lindley Johnson vetted an early draft of the screenplay over two years before the film's 2021 release.

== See also ==
- Asteroid impact avoidance
- Double Asteroid Redirection Test
- Impact event
- Spaceguard
- Space force
