= 14827 Hypnos =

Asteroid

Discovery
- Discovered by: C. S. Shoemaker; E. M. Shoemaker
- Discovery site: Palomar Obs.
- Discovery date: 5 May 1986

Designations
- Pronunciation: /ˈhɪpnɒs/
- Named after: Hypnos (Greek god of sleep)
- Alternative designations: 1986 JK
- Minor planet category: Apollo · NEO · PHA

Orbital characteristics
- Epoch 4 September 2017 (JD 2458000.5)
- Uncertainty parameter 0
- Observation arc: 19.32 yr (7,058 days)
- Aphelion: 4.7318 AU
- Perihelion: 0.9491 AU
- Semi-major axis: 2.8405 AU
- Eccentricity: 0.6659
- Orbital period (sidereal): 4.79 yr (1,749 days)
- Mean anomaly: 206.81°
- Mean motion: 0° 12^{m} 21.24^{s} / day
- Inclination: 1.9808°
- Longitude of ascending node: 57.976°
- Argument of perihelion: 238.09°
- Earth MOID: 0.0147 AU · 5.7 LD
- Jupiter MOID: 0.5249 AU

Physical characteristics
- Mean diameter: 0.520±0.260 km >0.74 km 0.9 km (Gehrels 1994); 0.907 km (derived)
- Geometric albedo: 0.057 (assumed) <0.067 (radar); 0.22±0.17
- Spectral type: C B–V = 0.684; U–B = 0.492
- Absolute magnitude (H): 18.3 · 18.65±0.22 · 18.94

14827 Hypnos (provisional designation: 1986 JK) is a highly eccentric, sub-kilometer-sized carbonaceous asteroid that is thought to be an extinct comet. It is classified as a near-Earth object and potentially hazardous asteroid of the Apollo group.

The asteroid was discovered by American astronomer couple Carolyn and Eugene Shoemaker at the Palomar Observatory in California on 5 May 1986. It was named after Hypnos, the Greek god of sleep.

== Orbit and classification ==
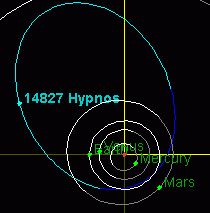
Comet-like orbit of Hypnos with a high eccentricity of 0.67

Hypnos orbits the Sun at a distance of 0.9–4.7 AU once every 4 years and 9 months (1,749 days). Its orbit has a high eccentricity of 0.67 and an inclination of 2° with respect to the ecliptic. It is frequently perturbed by Jupiter.

The body's observation arc begins at Anderson Mesa Station the night prior to its official discovery observation at Palomar.

=== Close approaches ===
As a near-Earth object and potentially hazardous asteroid Hypnos has an Earth minimum orbital intersection distance of 0.0147 AU (2,200,000 km), which corresponds to 5.7 lunar distances.

In 1958, Hypnos passed less than 0.03 AU from both Earth and Mars. Neither planet has been approached so closely by Hypnos since the 862 AD pass of Earth, or will be until the 2214 pass of Earth. It is also a Mars-crosser.

=== Extinct comet ===
Hypnos may be the nucleus of an extinct comet that is covered by a crust several centimeters thick that prevents any remaining volatiles from outgassing.

== Physical characteristics ==
Hypnos is an assumed carbonaceous C-type asteroid.

=== Lightcurves ===
As of 2018, no rotational lightcurve of Hypnos has been obtained from photometric observations. The asteroids rotation period and spin axis remains unknown. It has a low brightness amplitude of 0.05 magnitude which indicates that the body has a rather spheroidal shape.

=== Diameter and albedo ===
According to the NEOSurvey carried out by NASA's Spitzer Space Telescope, Hypnos measures 520 meters in diameter and its surface has an albedo of 0.22 based on an absolute magnitude of 18.65, while infrared radiometry gave a radar albedo of no more than 0.067 and a diameter of at least 740 meters.

The Collaborative Asteroid Lightcurve Link assumes a standard optical albedo for carbonaceous asteroids 0.057 and derives a diameter of 907 meters with an absolute magnitude of 18.94. The diameter agrees with Tom Gehrels 1994-publication Hazards due to Comets and Asteroids in which he estimated a mean diameter of 900 meters for Hypnos.

== Naming ==
This minor planet was named after Hypnos from Greek mythology. He is the god of sleep, son of Nyx and Erebus and twin brother of Thanatos. He enters the sleep of mortals and gives them dreams of foolishness or inspiration. The English word "hypnosis" is derived from his name. The official naming citation was published by the Minor Planet Center on 6 January 2003 (M.P.C. 47301).

== Exploration ==
Hypnos was a potential target for the LICIACube extended mission, but contact was lost shortly after completion of the primary mission.
