= Double Asteroid Redirection Test =

2021 NASA planetary defense mission

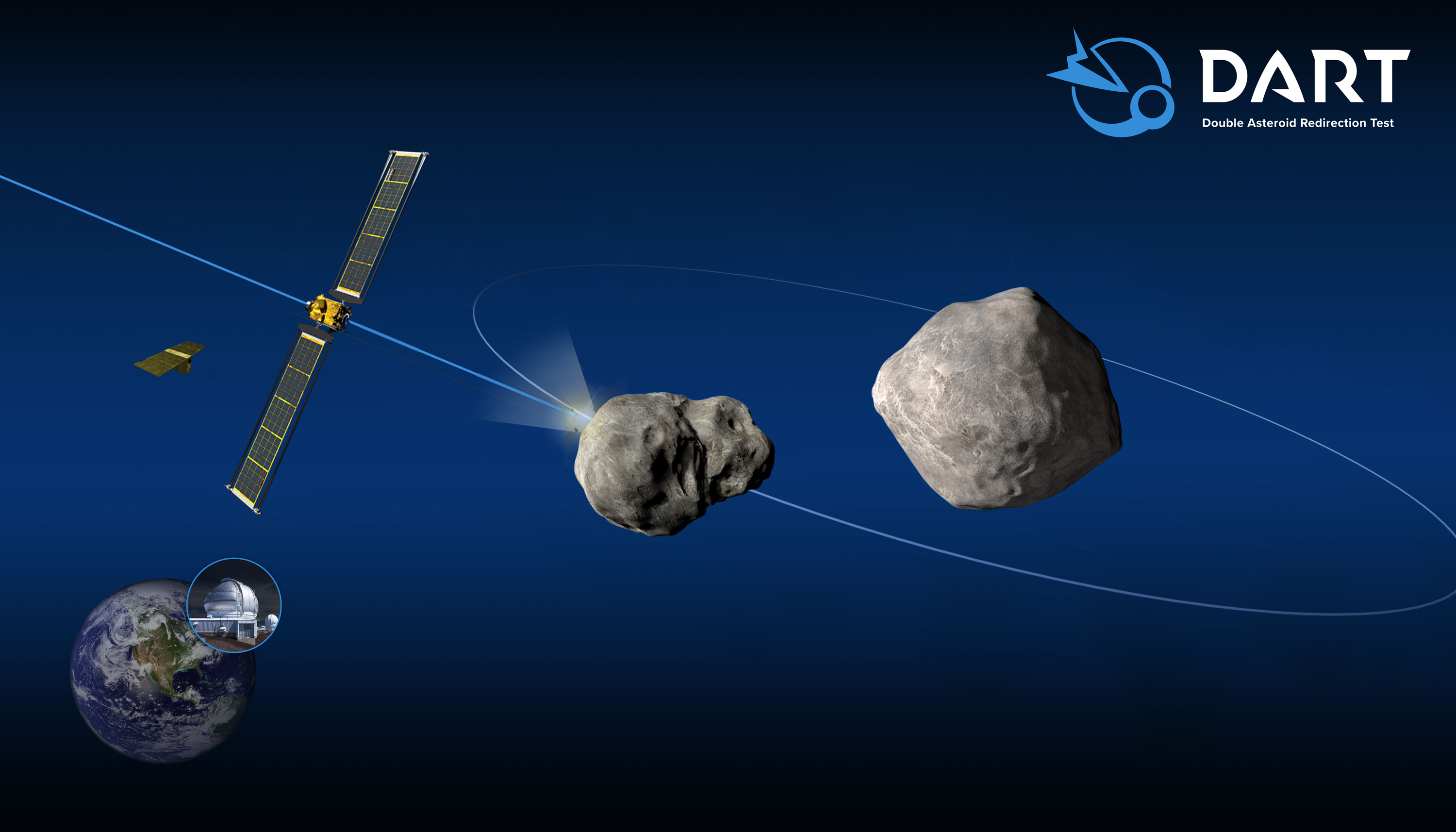
- Diagram of the DART spacecraft striking Dimorphos
- Names: DART
- Mission type: Planetary defense test mission
- Operator: NASA / APL
- Website: dart.jhuapl.edu/Mission
- Mission duration: 10 months, 1 day

Spacecraft properties
- Spacecraft: DART impactor; LICIACube CubeSat
- Manufacturer: Applied Physics Laboratory of Johns Hopkins University
- Launch mass: DART: 610 kg (1,340 lb); LICIACube: 14 kg (31 lb)
- Dimensions: DART: 1.8 × 1.9 × 2.6 m (5.9 × 6.2 × 8.5 ft); ROSA: 8.5 × 2.4 m (27.9 × 7.9 ft) (each)
- Power: 6.6 kW

Start of mission
- Launch date: 24 November 2021, 06:21:02 UTC
- Rocket: Falcon 9 Block 5 B1063-3
- Launch site: Vandenberg, SLC‑4E
- Contractor: SpaceX

Dimorphos impactor
- Impact date: 26 September 2022, 23:14 UTC

Flyby of Didymos system
- Spacecraft component: LICIACube (deployed from DART)
- Closest approach: 26 September 2022, ~23:17 UTC
- Distance: 56.7 km (35.2 mi)

Instruments
- Didymos Reconnaissance and Asteroid Camera for Optical navigation (DRACO)
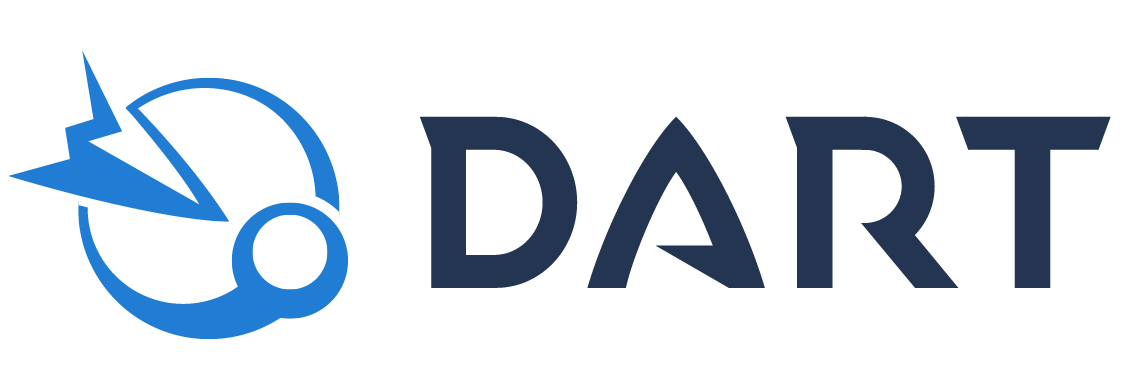
- Mission logo Solar System Exploration program

The Double Asteroid Redirection Test (DART) was a NASA space mission to test a method of planetary defense against near-Earth objects (NEOs). It was designed to assess how much a spacecraft impact can deflect an asteroid by hitting it head-on. The target asteroid, Dimorphos, is a 525 feet (160 m) wide moonlet of the asteroid Didymos; neither asteroid poses an impact threat to Earth, but their joint characteristics made them an ideal target.

Launched on 24 November 2021, the DART spacecraft collided with Dimorphos at 14,000 mph (23,000 km/h) on 26 September 2022 about 6.8 million miles (10.9 million kilometers) from Earth. The collision shortened Dimorphos's orbit around Didymos by 32 minutes, greatly in excess of the pre-defined success threshold of 73 seconds. Deflection resulted from the ejection of debris which caused a recoil that was substantially larger than the impact itself. The collision also very slightly increased the asteroid pair's orbital speed around the Sun—an effect directly relevant to the goal of planetary protection by changing an object's path through space.

DART was a joint project between NASA and the Johns Hopkins University Applied Physics Laboratory. The project was funded through NASA's Planetary Defense Coordination Office, managed by NASA's Planetary Missions Program Office at the Marshall Space Flight Center, and several NASA laboratories and offices provided technical support. The Italian Space Agency contributed LICIACube, a CubeSat which photographed the impact event, and other international partners, such as the European Space Agency (ESA), and Japan Aerospace Exploration Agency (JAXA), are contributing to related or subsequent projects.

== Mission history ==
NASA and the European Space Agency (ESA) started with individual plans for missions to test asteroid deflection strategies, but by 2015, they struck a collaboration called AIDA (Asteroid Impact and Deflection Assessment) involving two separate spacecraft launches that would work in synergy. Under that proposal, the European Asteroid Impact Mission (AIM), would have launched in December 2020, and DART in July 2021. AIM would have orbited the larger asteroid to study its composition and that of its moon. DART would then kinetically impact the asteroid's moon on 26 September 2022, during a close approach to Earth.

The AIM orbiter was however canceled, then replaced by Hera which plans to start observing the asteroid four years after the DART impact. Live monitoring of the DART impact thus had to be obtained from ground-based telescopes and radar.

In June 2017, NASA approved a move from concept development to the preliminary design phase, and in August 2018 the start of the final design and assembly phase of the mission. On 11 April 2019, NASA announced that a SpaceX Falcon 9 would be used to launch DART.

Satellite impact on a small Solar System body had already been implemented once, by NASA's 372-kilogram (820 lb) Deep Impact space probe's impactor spacecraft and for a completely different purpose (analysis of the structure and composition of a comet). On impact, Deep Impact released 19 gigajoules of energy (the equivalent of 4.8 tons of TNT), and excavated a crater up to 150 metres (490 ft) wide.

== Description ==
=== Spacecraft ===
The DART spacecraft was an impactor with a mass of 610 kilograms (1,340 lb) that hosted no scientific payload and had sensors only for navigation. The spacecraft cost US$330 million by the time it collided with Dimorphos in 2022.

==== Camera ====
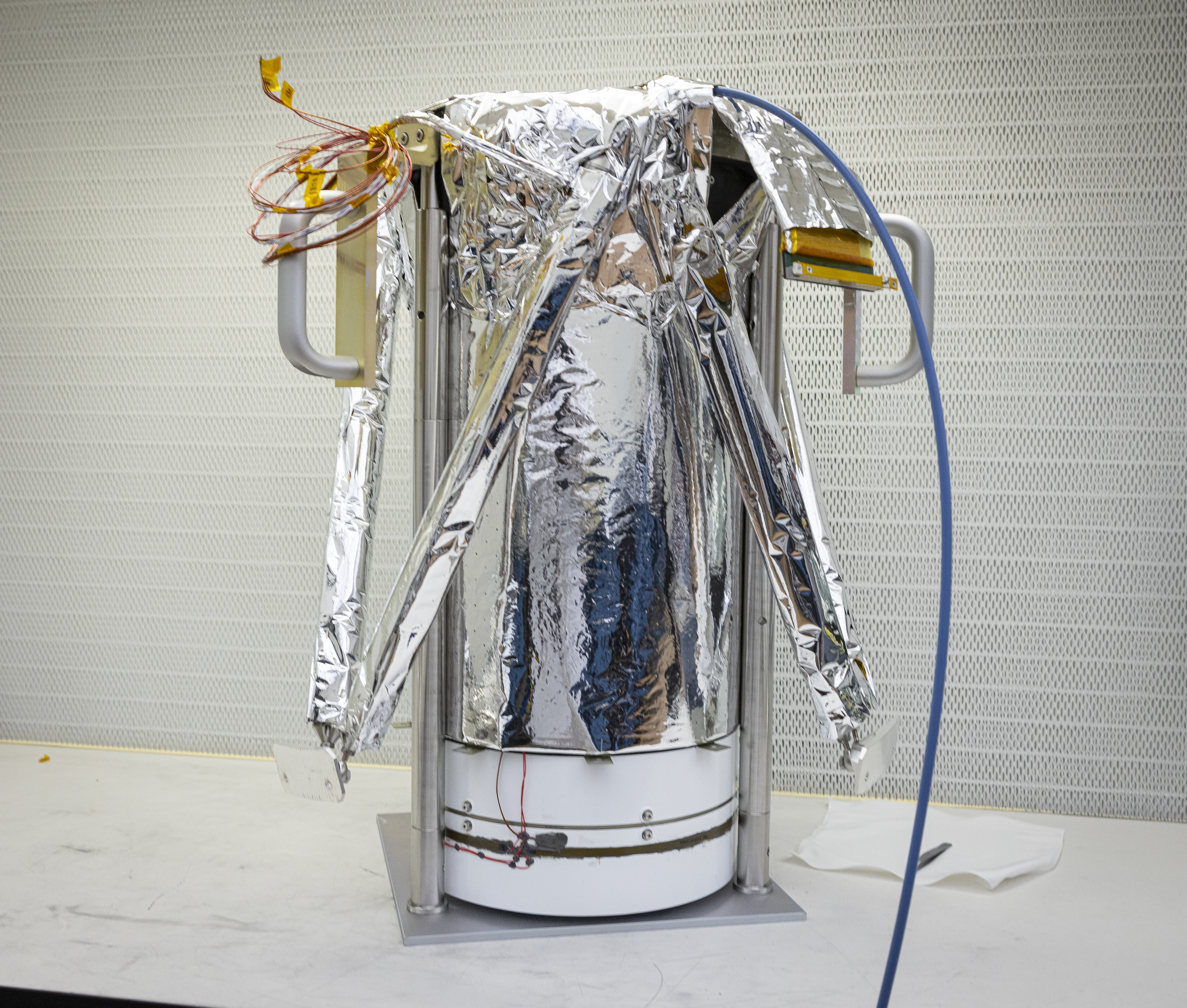
DRACO camera

DART's navigation sensors included a Sun sensor, a star tracker called SMART Nav software (Small-body Maneuvering Autonomous Real Time Navigation), and a 20-centimetre (7.9 in) aperture camera called Didymos Reconnaissance and Asteroid Camera for Optical navigation (DRACO). DRACO was based on the Long Range Reconnaissance Imager (LORRI) onboard New Horizons spacecraft, and supported autonomous navigation to impact the asteroid's moon at its center. The optical part of DRACO was a Ritchey-Chrétien telescope with a field of view of 0.29° and a focal length of 2.6208 m (f/12.60). The spatial resolution of the images taken immediately before the impact was around 20 centimeters per pixel. The instrument had a mass of 8.66 kilograms (19.1 lb).

The detector used in the camera was a CMOS image sensor measuring 2,560 × 2,160 pixels. The detector records the wavelength range from 0.4 to 1 micron (visible and near infrared). A commercial off-the-shelf CMOS detector was used instead of a custom charge-coupled device in LORRI. DRACO's detector performance actually met or exceeded that of LORRI because of the improvements in sensor technology in the decade separating the design of LORRI and DRACO. Fed into an onboard computer with software descended from anti-missile technology, the DRACO images helped DART autonomously guide itself to its crash.

==== Solar arrays ====
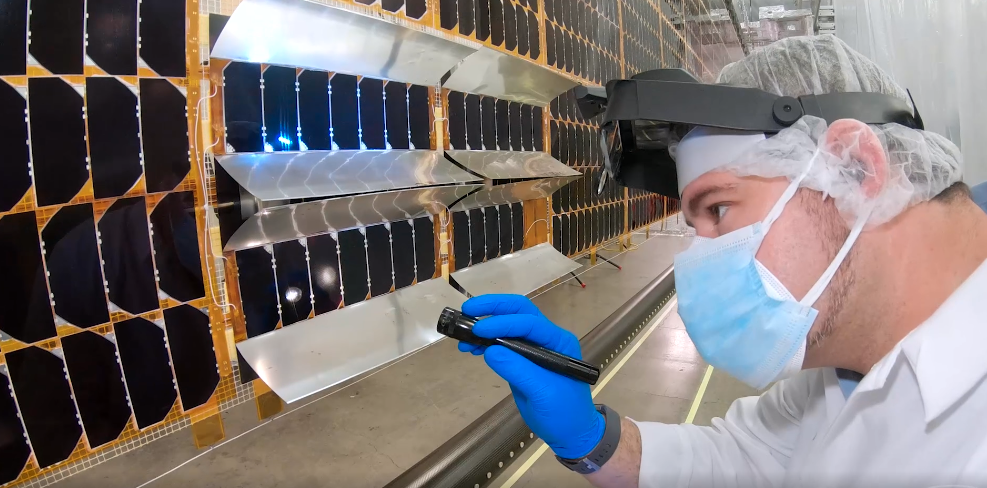
The spacecraft's solar arrays used a Roll Out Solar Array (ROSA) design, that was tested on the International Space Station (ISS) in June 2017 as part of Expedition 52.

Using ROSA as the structure, a small portion of the DART solar array was configured to demonstrate Transformational Solar Array technology, which has very-high-efficiency SolAero Inverted Metamorphic (IMM) solar cells and reflective concentrators providing three times more power than other available solar array technology.

==== Antenna ====
The DART spacecraft was the first spacecraft to use a new type of high-gain communication antenna, a Spiral Radial Line Slot Array (RLSA). The circularly-polarized antenna operated at the (microwave) X-band NASA Deep Space Network (NASA DSN) frequencies of 7.2 and 8.4 GHz, and had a gain of 29.8 dBi on downlink and 23.6 dBi on uplink. The fabricated antenna in a flat and compact shape exceeded the given requirements and was tested through environments resulting in a TRL-6 design.

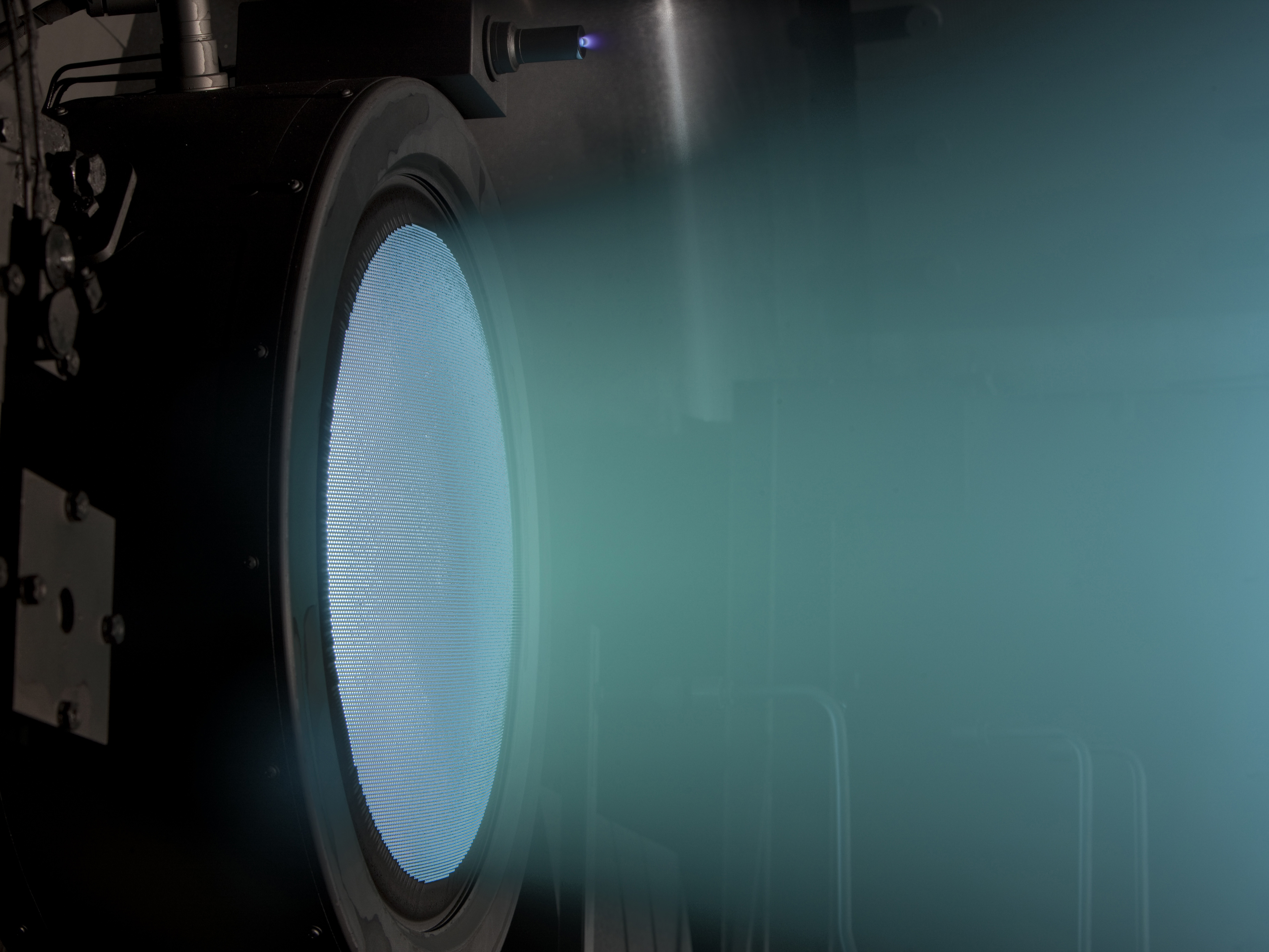
NASA's Evolutionary Xenon Thruster (NEXT)

==== Ion thruster ====
DART demonstrated the NEXT gridded ion thruster, a type of solar electric propulsion. It was powered by 22-square-metre (240 sq ft) solar arrays to generate the approximately 3.5 kW needed to power the NASA Evolutionary Xenon Thruster–Commercial (NEXT-C) engine. Early tests of the ion thruster revealed a reset mode that induced higher current (100 A) in the spacecraft structure than expected (25 A). It was decided not to use the ion thruster further as the mission could be accomplished without it, using conventional thrusters fueled by the 50 kilograms (110 lb) of hydrazine onboard. However, the ion thrusters remained available if needed to deal with contingencies, and had DART missed its target, the ion system could have returned DART to Dimorphos two years later.

=== Secondary spacecraft ===
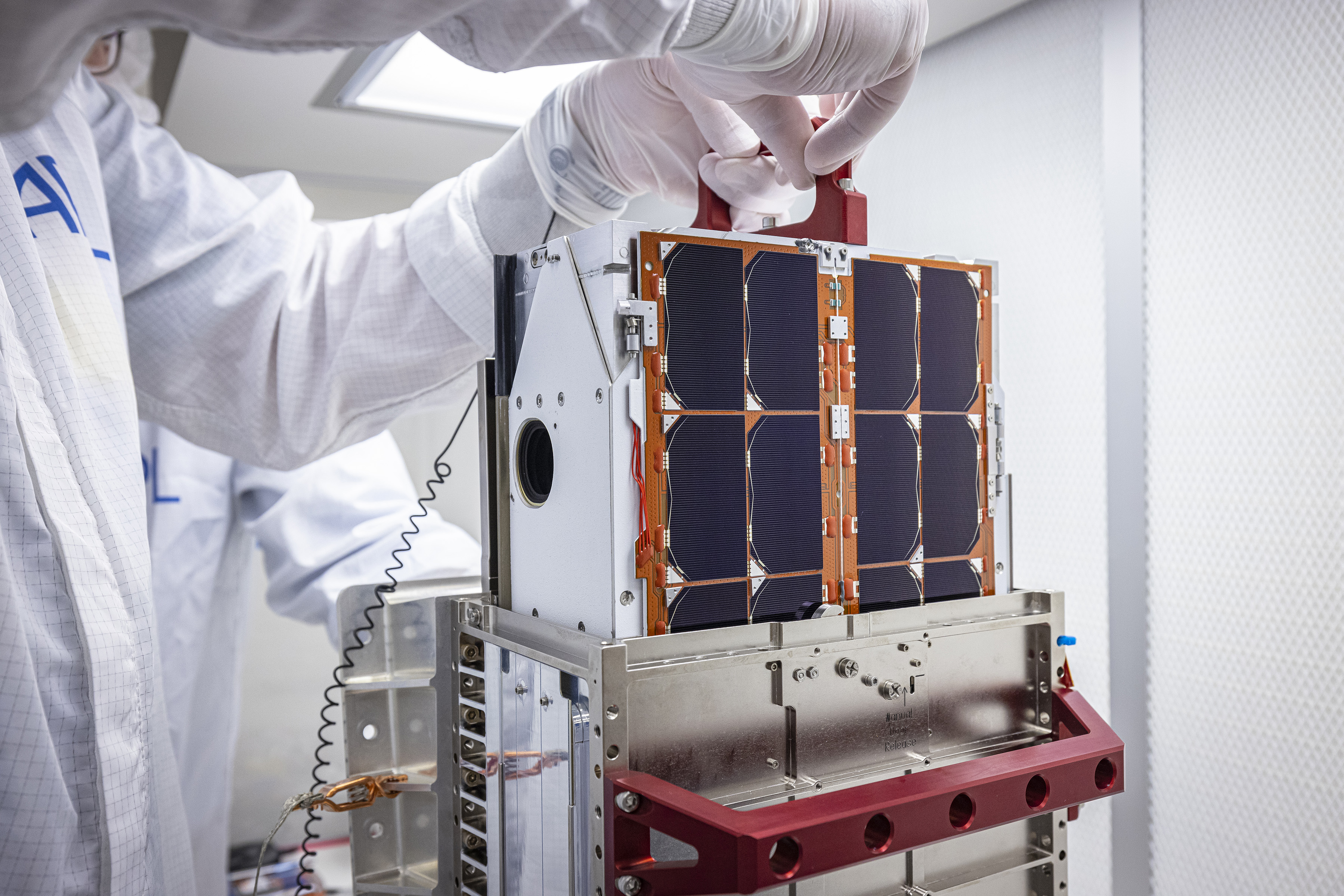
LICIACube CubeSat, a companion satellite of the DART spacecraft

The Italian Space Agency (ASI) contributed a secondary spacecraft called LICIACube (Light Italian CubeSat for Imaging of Asteroids), a small CubeSat that piggybacked with DART and separated on 11 September 2022, 15 days before impact. It acquired images of the impact and ejecta as it drifted past the asteroid. LICIACube communicated directly with Earth, sending back images of the ejecta after the Dimorphos flyby. LICIACube is equipped with two optical cameras, dubbed LUKE and LEIA.

=== Effect of the impact on Dimorphos and Didymos ===
Animation of DART around Didymos - Impact on Dimorphos DART · Didymos · Dimorphos

The spacecraft hit Dimorphos in the direction opposite to the asteroid's motion. Following the impact, the instantaneous orbital speed of Dimorphos therefore dropped slightly, which reduced the radius of its orbit around Didymos. The trajectory of Didymos was also modified, but in inverse proportion to the ratio of its mass to the much lower mass of Dimorphos and therefore not much. The actual velocity change and orbital shift depended on the topography and composition of the surface, among other things. The contribution of the recoil momentum from the impact ejecta produces a poorly predictable "momentum enhancement" effect. Before the impact, the momentum transferred by DART to the largest remaining fragment of the asteroid was estimated as up to 3–5 times the incident momentum, depending on how much and how fast material would be ejected from the impact crater. Obtaining accurate measurements of that effect was one of the mission's main goals and will help refine models of future impacts on asteroids.

Scientists later determined that the impact also slightly changed the orbit of the asteroid pair around the Sun--the first time human action measurably had such an effect on a celestial body. The orbital speed increased by about two inches an hour from the pre-impact speed of 76,000 miles per hour (122,000 km/h). Amateur astronomers in several countries contributed data by precisely measuring the pair's occultation of background stars along their orbit after impact. Scientists also used radio telescope data about the pair obtained before and after impact. According to a study author, even such a tiny orbital change might prevent a catastrophic asteroid collision with Earth.

The DART impact excavated surface/subsurface materials of Dimorphos, leading to the formation of a crater and/or some magnitude of reshaping (i.e., shape change without significant mass loss). Some of the ejecta may eventually hit Didymos's surface. If the kinetic energy delivered to its surface was high enough, reshaping may have also occurred in Didymos, given its near-rotational-breakup spin rate. Reshaping on either body would have modified their mutual gravitational field, leading to a reshaping-induced orbital period change, in addition to the impact-induced orbital period change. If left unaccounted for, this could later have led to an erroneous interpretation of the effect of the kinetic deflection technique.

=== Observations of the impact ===
Telescopes observing DART's impact

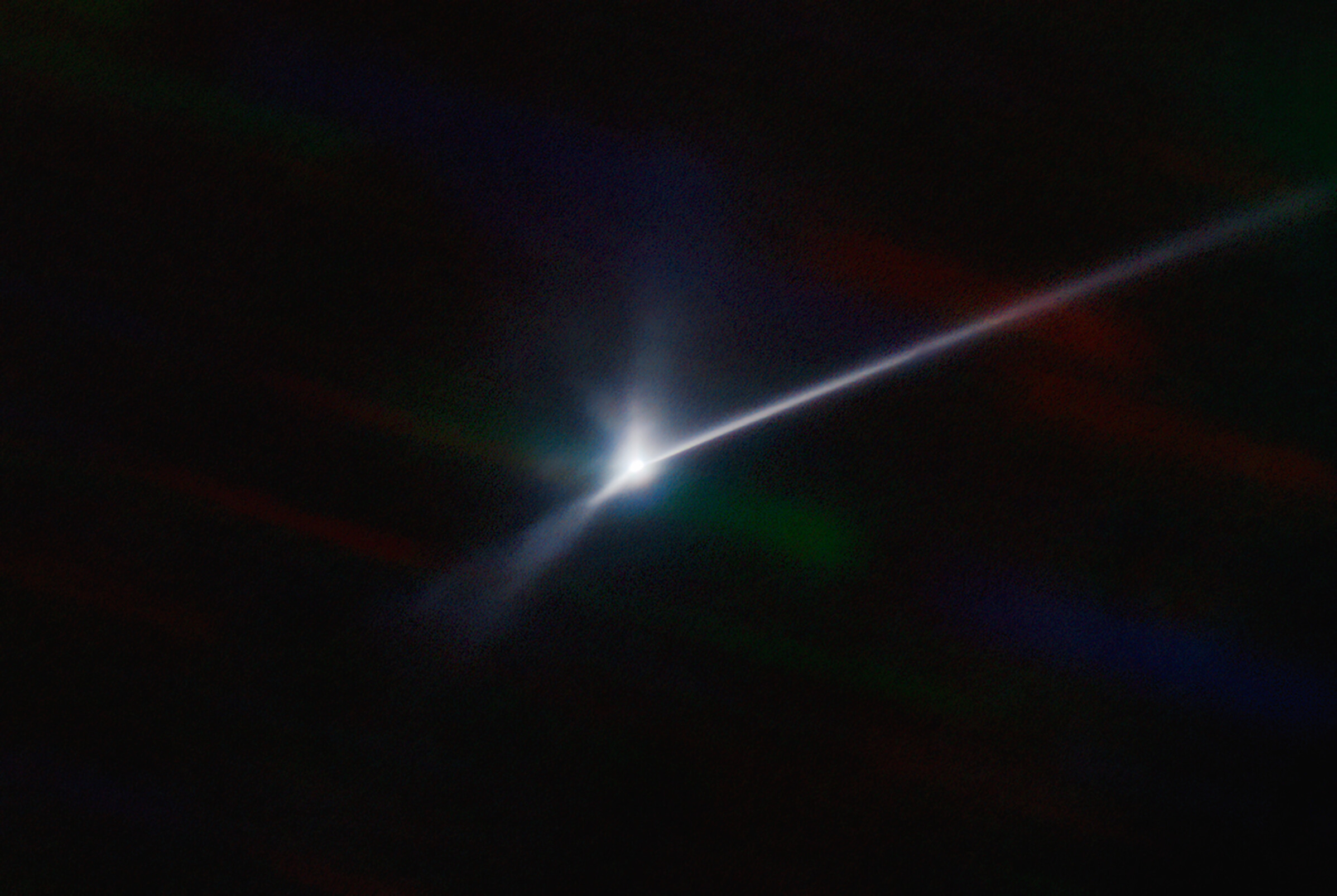
SOAR telescope shows the vast plume of dust and debris blasted from the surface of the asteroid Dimorphos

DART's companion LICIACube, the Hubble Space Telescope, James Webb Space Telescope, and the Earth-based ATLAS observatory all detected the ejecta plume from the DART impact. On September 26, SOAR observed the visible impact trail to be over 10,000 kilometres (0.026 LD; 6,200 mi) long. Initial estimates of the change in binary orbit period were expected within a week and with the data released by LICIACube. DART's mission science depends on careful Earth-based monitoring of the orbit of Dimorphos over the subsequent days and months. Dimorphos was too small and too close to Didymos for almost any observer to see directly, but its orbital geometry is such that it transits Didymos once each orbit and then passes behind it half an orbit later. Any observer that can detect the Didymos system therefore sees the system dim and brighten again as the two bodies cross.

The impact was planned for a moment when the distance between Didymos and Earth is at a minimum, permitting many telescopes to make observations from many locations. The asteroid was near opposition and visible high in the night sky well into 2023. The change in Dimorphos's orbit around Didymos was detected by optical telescopes watching mutual eclipses of the two bodies through photometry on the Dimorphos-Didymos pair. In addition to radar observations, they confirmed that the impact shortened Dimorphos's orbital period by 32 minutes. Based on the shortened binary orbital period, the instantaneous reduction in Dimorphos's velocity component along its orbital track was determined, which indicated that substantially more momentum was transferred to Dimorphos from the escaping impact ejecta than from the impact itself. In this way, the DART kinetic impact was highly effective in deflecting Dimorphos.

=== Follow-up mission ===
In a collaborating project, the European Space Agency has developed Hera, a spacecraft that was launched to Didymos in October 2024 and arrived in 2026 to do a detailed reconnaissance and assessment. Hera carries two CubeSats, Milani and Juventas.

=== AIDA mission architecture ===
Host spacecraft	Secondary spacecraft	Remarks
DART	LICIACube	By the Italian Space Agency; 6U CubeSat; LUKE (LICIACube Unit Key Explorer) Camera and LEIA (LICIACube Explorer Imaging for Asteroid) Camera
Hera	Juventas	By GomSpace and GMV; 6U CubeSat orbiter; Camera, JuRa monostatic low-frequency radar, accelerometers, and gravimeter; Will attempt to land on the asteroid surface
Hera	Milani	By Italy/Czech/Finnish consortium; 6U CubeSat orbiter; VIS/Near-IR spectrometer, volatile analyzer; Will characterize Didymos and Dimorphos surface composition and the dust environment around the system; Will perform technology demonstration experiments

== Mission profile ==
=== Target asteroid ===
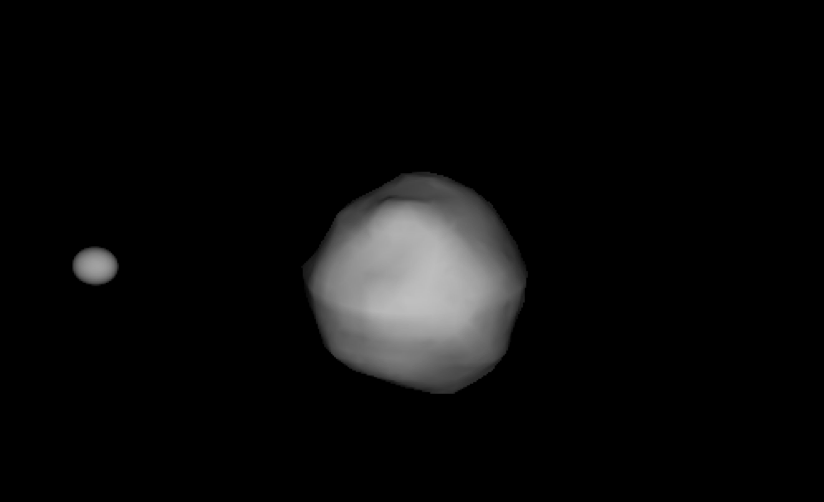
Pre-impact shape model of Didymos and its satellite Dimorphos, based on photometric light curve and radar data

The mission's target was Dimorphos in 65803 Didymos system, a binary asteroid system in which one asteroid is orbited by a smaller one. The primary asteroid (Didymos A) is about 780 metres (2,560 ft) in diameter; the asteroid moon Dimorphos (Didymos B) is about 160 metres (520 ft) in diameter in an orbit about 1 kilometre (0.62 mi) from the primary. The mass of the Didymos system is estimated at 528 billion kg, with Dimorphos comprising 4.8 billion kg of that total. Choosing a binary asteroid system is advantageous because changes to Dimorphos's velocity can be measured by observing when Dimorphos subsequently passes in front of its companion, causing a dip in light that can be seen by Earth telescopes. Dimorphos was also chosen due to its appropriate size; it is in the size range of asteroids that one would want to deflect, were they on a collision course with Earth. In addition, the binary system was relatively close to the Earth in 2022, at about 7 million miles (0.075 astronomical units; 29 lunar distances; 11 million kilometers). The Didymos system is not an Earth-crossing asteroid, and there is no possibility that the deflection experiment could create an impact hazard. On 4 October 2022, Didymos made an Earth approach of 10.6 million kilometres (0.071 astronomical units; 28 lunar distances; 6.6 million miles).

=== Preflight preparations ===
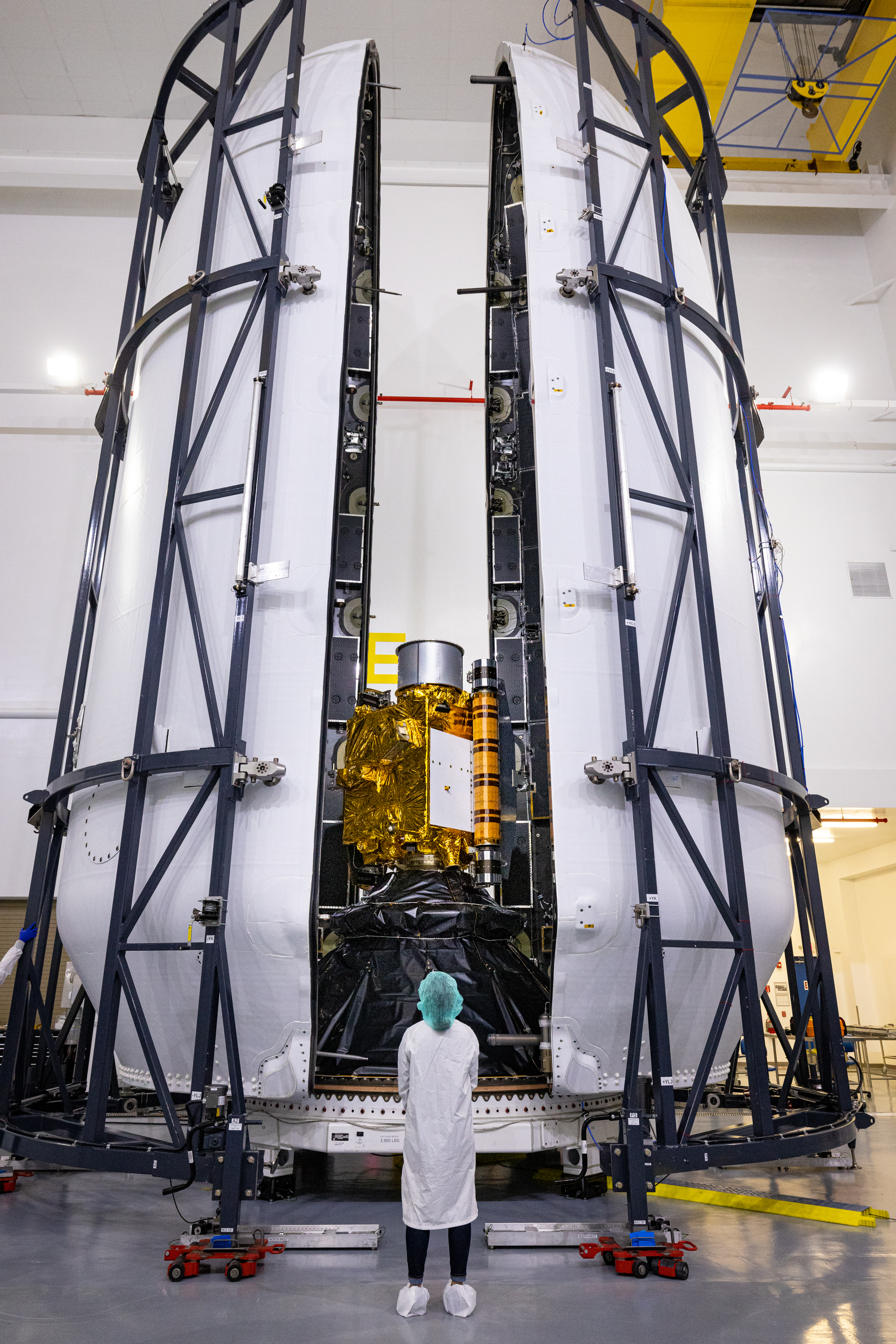
DART being encapsulated in the Falcon 9 payload fairing on 16 November 2021

Launch preparations for DART began on 20 October 2021, as the spacecraft began fueling at Vandenberg Space Force Base (VSFB) in California. The spacecraft arrived at Vandenberg in early October 2021 after a cross-country drive. DART team members prepared the spacecraft for flight, testing the spacecraft's mechanisms and electrical system, wrapping the final parts in multilayer insulation blankets and practicing the launch sequence from both the launch site and the mission operations center at APL. DART headed to the SpaceX Payload Processing Facility on VSFB on 26 October 2021. Two days later, the team received the green light to fill DART's fuel tank with roughly 50 kilograms (110 lb) of hydrazine propellant for spacecraft maneuvers and attitude control. DART also carried about 60 kilograms (130 lb) of xenon for the NEXT-C ion engine. Engineers loaded the xenon before the spacecraft left APL in early October 2021.

Starting on 10 November 2021, engineers mated the spacecraft to the adapter that stacks on top of the SpaceX Falcon 9 launch vehicle. The Falcon 9 rocket without the payload fairing rolled for a static fire and later came back to the processing facility again where technicians with SpaceX installed the two halves of the fairing around the spacecraft over the course of two days, 16 and 17 November, inside the SpaceX Payload Processing Facility at Vandenberg Space Force Base and the ground teams completed a successful Flight Readiness Review later that week with the fairing then attached to the rocket.

A day before launch, the launch vehicle rolled out of the hangar and onto the launch pad at Vandenberg Space Launch Complex 4 (SLC-4E); from there, it lifted off to begin DART's journey to the Didymos system and it propelled the spacecraft into space.

=== Launch ===
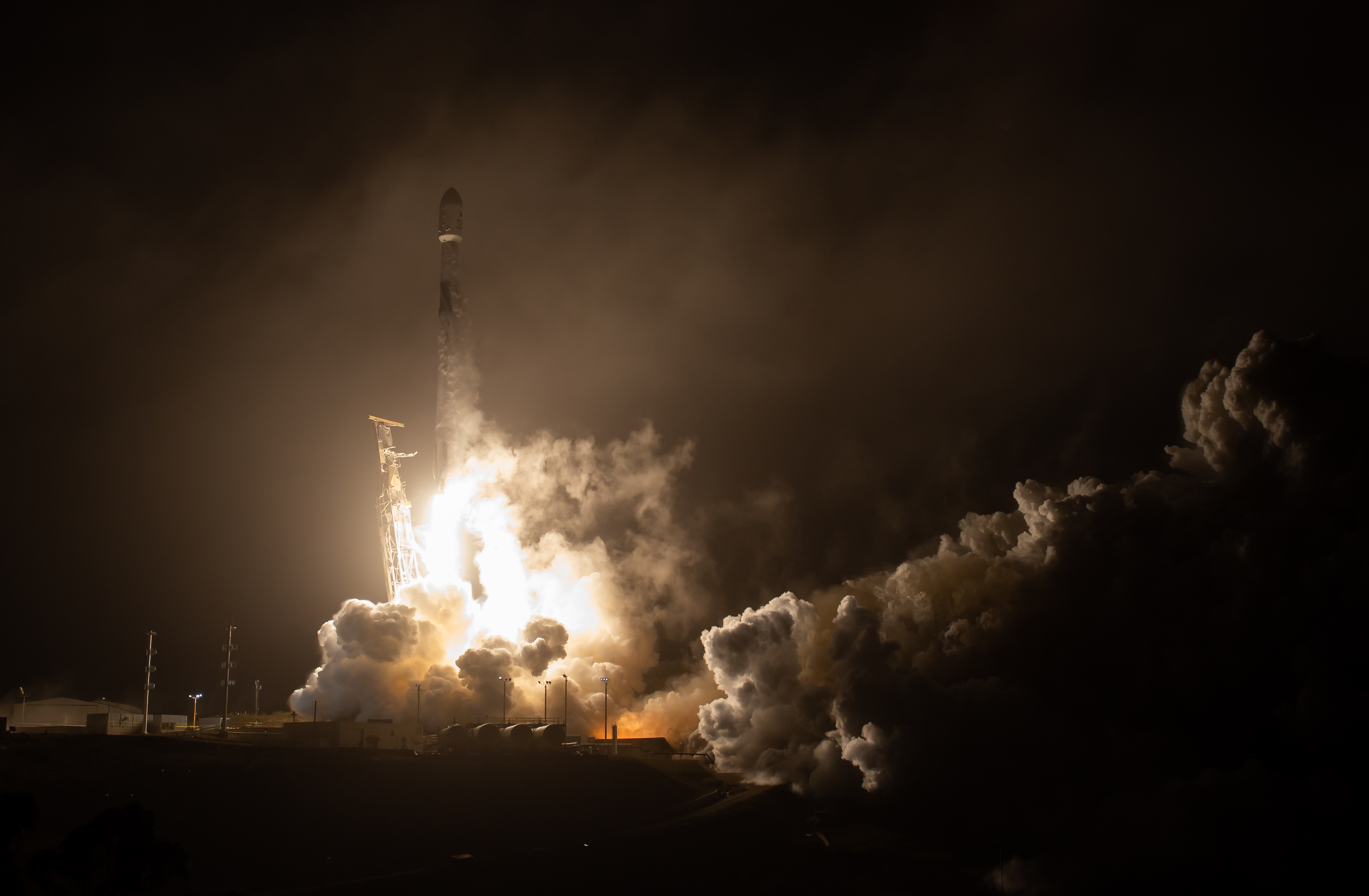
Liftoff of Falcon 9 with DART.

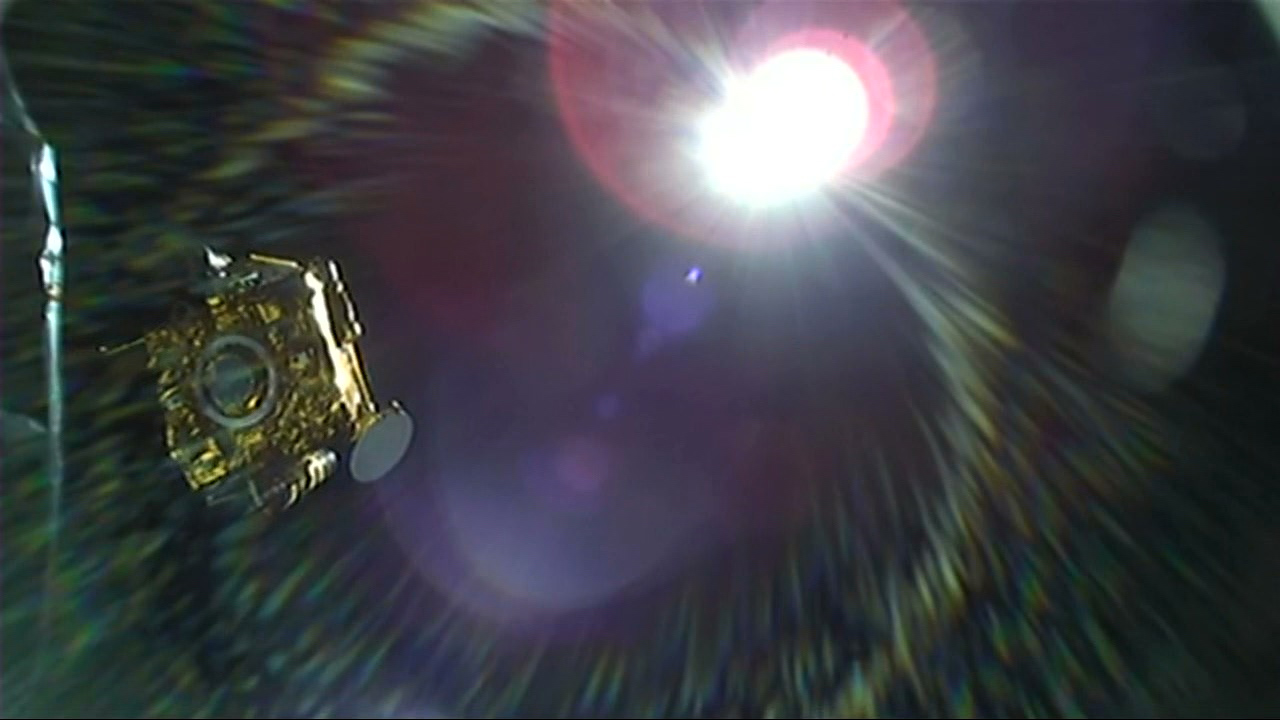
DART separation from second stage

The DART spacecraft was launched on 24 November 2021, at 06:21:02 UTC.

Early planning suggested that DART was to be deployed into a high-altitude, high-eccentricity Earth orbit designed to avoid the Moon. In such a scenario, DART would use its low-thrust, high-efficiency NEXT ion engine to slowly escape from its high Earth orbit to a slightly inclined near-Earth solar orbit, from which it would maneuver onto a collision trajectory with its target. But because DART was launched as a dedicated Falcon 9 mission, the payload along with Falcon 9's second stage was placed directly on an Earth escape trajectory and into heliocentric orbit when the second stage reignited for a second engine startup or escape burn. Thus, although DART carries a first-of-its-kind electric thruster and plenty of xenon fuel, Falcon 9 did almost all of the work, leaving the spacecraft to perform only a few trajectory-correction burns with simple chemical thrusters as it homed in on Didymos's moon Dimorphos.

=== Transit ===
Animation of DART's trajectory DART · 65803 Didymos · Earth · Sun · 2001 CB21 · 3361 Orpheus

The transit phase before impact lasted about 9 months. During its interplanetary travel, the DART spacecraft made a distant flyby of the 578-metre (1,896-foot) diameter near-Earth asteroid (138971) 2001 CB21 in March 2022. DART passed 0.117 astronomical units (46 lunar distances; 17.5 million kilometres; 10.9 million miles) from 2001 CB_{21} in its closest approach on 2 March 2022.

DART's DRACO camera opened its aperture door and took its first light image of some stars on 7 December 2021, when it was 2 million miles (0.022 astronomical units; 8.4 lunar distances; 3.2 million kilometres) away from Earth. The stars in DRACO's first light image were used as calibration for the camera's pointing before it could be used to image other targets. On 10 December 2021, DRACO imaged the open cluster Messier 38 for further optical and photometric calibration.

On 27 May 2022, DART observed the bright star Vega with DRACO to test the camera's optics with scattered light. On 1 July and 2 August 2022, DART's DRACO imager observed Jupiter and its moon Europa emerging from behind the planet, as a performance test for the SMART Nav tracking system to prepare for the Dimorphos impact.

=== Course of the impact ===
Two months before the impact, on 27 July 2022, the DRACO camera detected the Didymos system from approximately 32 million kilometres (0.21 astronomical units; 83 lunar distances; 20 million miles) away and started refining its trajectory. The LICIACube nanosatellite was released on 11 September 2022, 15 days before the impact. Four hours before impact, some 90,000 kilometres (0.23 LD; 56,000 mi) away, DART began to operate in complete autonomy under control of its SMART Nav guidance system. Three hours before impact, DART performed an inventory of objects near the target. Ninety minutes before the collision, when DART was 38,000 kilometres (0.099 LD; 24,000 mi) away from Dimorphos, the final trajectory was established. When DART was 24,000 kilometres (0.062 LD; 15,000 mi) away Dimorphos became discernible (1.4 pixels) through the DRACO camera which then continued to capture images of the asteroid's surface and transmit them in real-time.

DRACO was the only instrument able to provide a detailed view of Dimorphos's surface. The use of DART's thrusters caused vibrations throughout the spacecraft and solar panels, resulting in blurred images. To ensure sharp images, the last trajectory correction was executed 4 minutes before impact and the thrusters were deactivated afterwards.

Compiled timelapse of DART's final 5.5 minutes until impact

The last full image, transmitted two seconds before impact, has a spatial resolution of about 3 centimeters per pixel. The impact took place on 26 September 2022, at 23:14 UTC.

The head-on impact of the 500 kilograms (1,100 lb) DART spacecraft at 6.6 kilometres per second (4.1 mi/s) or 22,530 kilometres per hour (14,000 mph) likely imparted an energy of about 11 gigajoules, the equivalent of about three tonnes of TNT, and was expected to reduce the orbital velocity of Dimorphos between 1.75 cm/s and 2.54 cm/s, depending on numerous factors such as material porosity. The reduction in Dimorphos's orbital velocity brings it closer to Didymos, resulting in the moon experiencing greater gravitational acceleration and thus a shorter orbital period. The orbital period reduction from the head-on impact serves to facilitate ground-based observations of Dimorphos. An impact to the asteroid's trailing side would instead increase its orbital period towards 12 hours and make it coincide with Earth's day and night cycle, which would limit any single ground-based telescope from observing all orbital phases of Dimorphos nightly.

DART impact and its corresponding plume as seen by using the Mookodi instrument on the SAAO's 1-m Lesedi telescope

The measured momentum enhancement factor (called beta) of DART's impact of Dimorphos was 3.6, which means that the impact transferred roughly 3.6 times greater momentum than if the asteroid had simply absorbed the spacecraft and produced no ejecta at all – indicating the ejecta contributed more to moving the asteroid than the spacecraft did. This means one could use either a smaller impactor or shorter lead times to produce a certain deflection in an asteroid than previously expected. The value of beta depends on various factors, composition, density, porosity, etc. The goal is to use these results and modeling to infer what beta could be for another asteroid by observing its surface and possibly measuring its bulk density. Scientists estimate that DART's impact displaced over 1,000,000 kilograms (2,200,000 lb) of dusty ejecta into space – enough to fill six or seven rail cars. The tail of ejecta from Dimorphos created by the DART impact is at least 30,000 kilometres (0.078 LD; 19,000 mi) long with a mass of at least 1,000 tonnes (980 long tons; 1,100 short tons), and possibly up to 10 times that much.

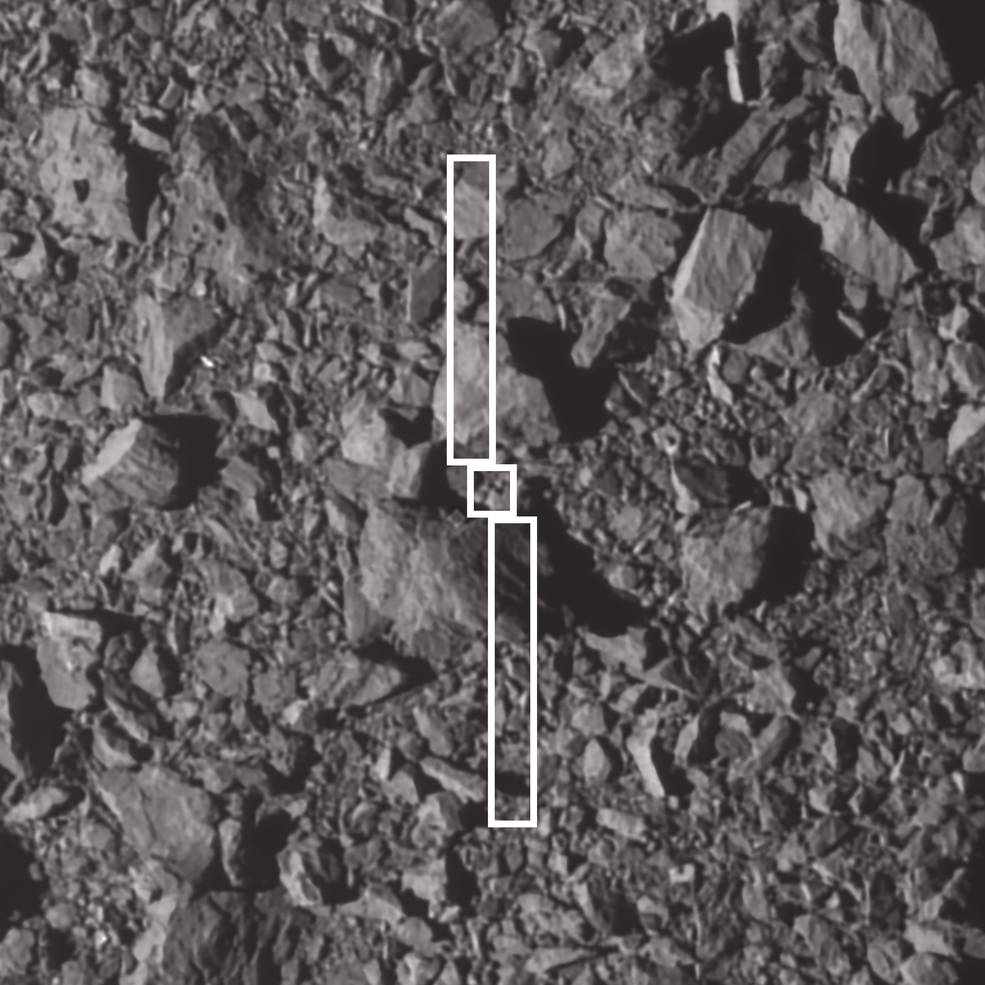
Footprint of DART spacecraft over the spot where it impacted asteroid Dimorphos

The DART impact on the center of Dimorphos decreased the orbital period, previously 11 hours and 52 minutes, by 33±1 minutes. This large change indicates the recoil from material excavated from the asteroid and ejected into space by the impact (known as ejecta) contributed significant momentum change to the asteroid, beyond that of the DART spacecraft itself. Researchers found the impact caused an instantaneous slowing in Dimorphos's speed along its orbit of about 2.7 millimeters per second — again indicating the recoil from ejecta played a major role in amplifying the momentum change directly imparted to the asteroid by the spacecraft. That momentum change was amplified by a factor of 2.2 to 4.9 (depending on the mass of Dimorphos), indicating the momentum change transferred because of ejecta production significantly exceeded the momentum change from the DART spacecraft alone. While the orbital change was small, the change is in the velocity and over the course of years will accumulate to a large change in position. For a hypothetical Earth-threatening body, even such a tiny change could be sufficient to mitigate or prevent an impact, if applied early enough. As the diameter of Earth is around 13,000 kilometers, a hypothetical asteroid impact could be avoided with as little of a shift as half of that (6,500 kilometers). A 2 cm/s velocity change accumulates to that distance in approximately 10 years.

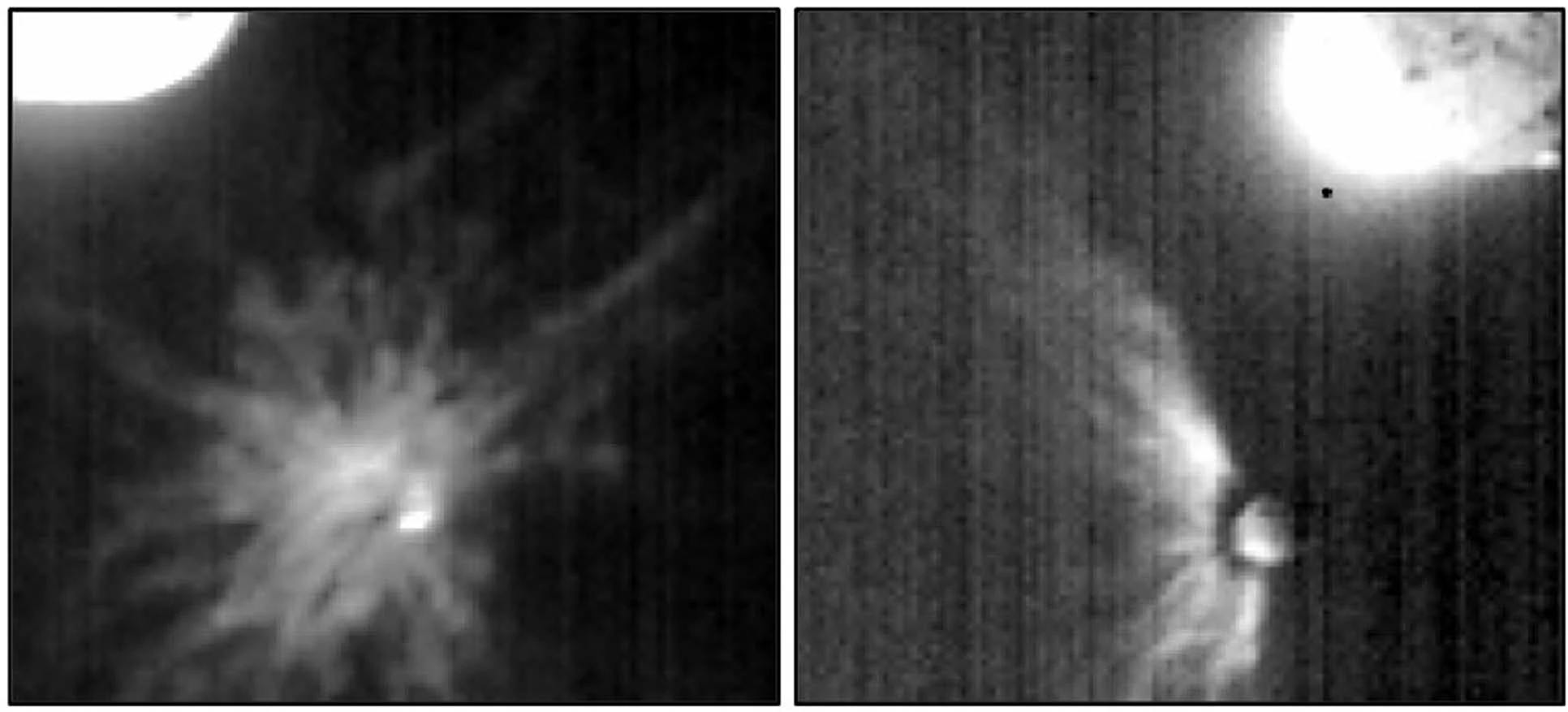
Dart Impact seen by LICIACube

By smashing into the asteroid, DART made Dimorphos an active asteroid. Scientists had proposed that some active asteroids are the result of impact events, but no one had ever observed the activation of an asteroid. The DART mission activated Dimorphos under precisely known and carefully observed impact conditions, enabling the detailed study of the formation of an active asteroid for the first time. Observations show that Dimorphos lost approximately 1 million kilograms of mass as a result of the collision.

==== Sequence of operations for impact ====
Date (before impact)	Distance from Dimorphos	Raw image (Note: The original raw DRACO images from DART were mirror flipped from reality. The images shown in the sequence of operations are uncorrected and show Didymos and Dimorphos as they appear on the DRACO detector.)	Events
27 July 2022 (T-60 days)	38 million kilometers (0.25 astronomical units; 99 lunar distances; 24 million miles)		The DRACO camera detects the Didymos system.
11 September 2022; 23:14 UTC (T-15 days)	8 million kilometers (0.053 astronomical units; 21 lunar distances; 5.0 million miles)		Ejection of LICIACube, which maneuvers to avoid crashing into the asteroid.
26 September 2022; 19:14 UTC (T-4 hours)	89,000 kilometers (0.23 lunar distances; 55,000 miles)		Terminal phase—start of autonomous navigation with SMART Nav. DRACO locks onto Didymos since Dimorphos is not visible yet.
22:14 UTC (T-60 minutes)	22,000 kilometers (0.057 lunar distances; 14,000 miles)		The DRACO camera detects Dimorphos.
22:54 UTC (T-20 minutes)	7,500 kilometers (4,700 miles)		SMART Nav enters precision lock onto Dimorphos and DART begins thrusting toward Dimorphos.
23:10 UTC (T-4 minutes)	1,500 kilometers (930 miles)		Start of final course correction
23:11 UTC (T-2 minutes 30 seconds)	920 kilometers (570 miles)		Last image with both Didymos (lower-left) and Dimorphos entirely in frame is taken
23:12 UTC (T-2 minutes)	740 kilometers (460 miles)		End of final course correction
23:14 UTC (T-20 seconds)	130 kilometers (81 miles)		The photos taken reach the expected spatial resolution.
23:14 UTC (T-11 seconds)	68 kilometers (42 miles)		Last image showing all of Dimorphos by DART
23:14 UTC (T-3 seconds)	18 kilometers (11 miles)		
23:14 UTC (T-2 seconds)	12 kilometers (7.5 miles)		Final complete image of Dimorphos transmitted. Resolution roughly 3 cm per pixel (~ 30m across).
23:14 UTC (T-1 second)	6 kilometers (3.7 miles)		Last partial image taken by DART before impact, transmission of this image was terminated by the destruction of the transmitter. Resolution roughly 1.5cm per pixel (~ 14.7m across).
23:14 UTC (T-0)	0 kilometers (0 miles)		Impact Dimorphos (estimated impact velocity 6 kilometers/second)
23:17 UTC (T+2 min 45 s)	56.7 kilometers (35.2 miles)		Closest approach to Dimorphos by LICIACube.

== Gallery ==
DART Mission animated video from launch to impact along with separation of LICIACube

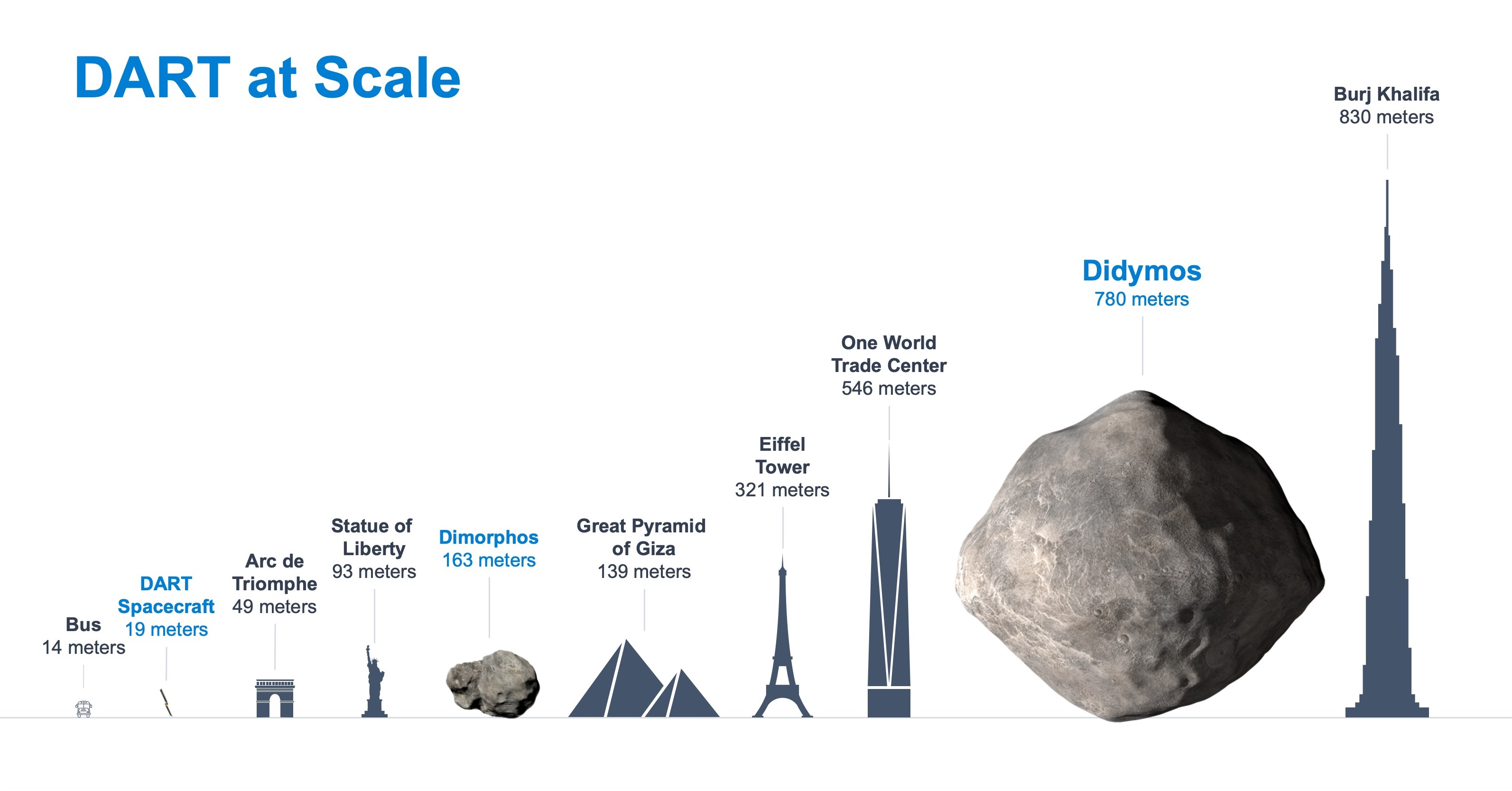
Size comparison of DART and the two Didymos asteroids

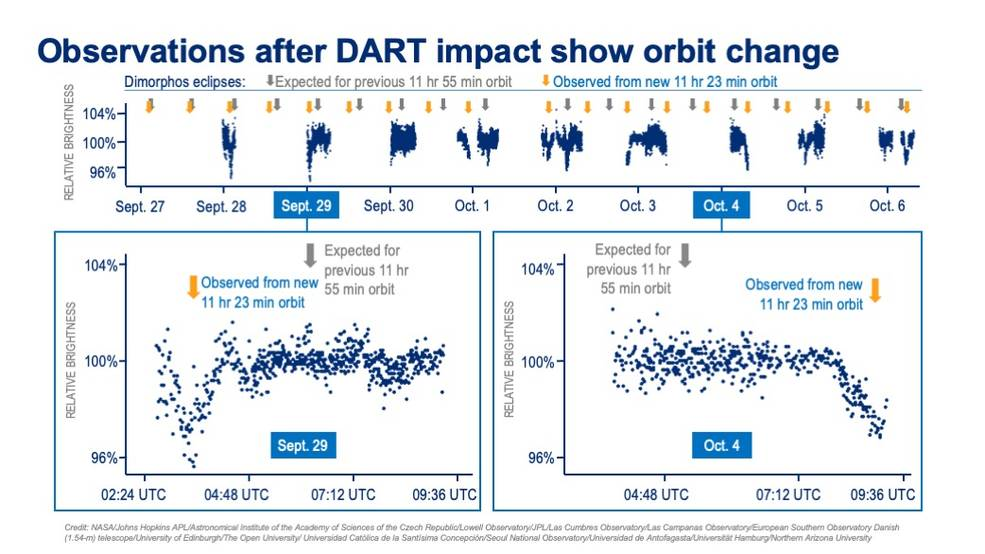
This chart offers insight into data the DART team used to determine the orbit of Dimorphos after impact.

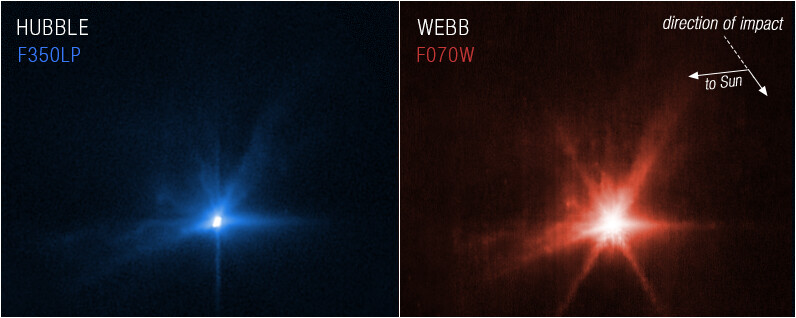
Images of the impact captured by the Hubble (left) and Webb space telescopes (right).

== See also ==
- Asteroid impact avoidance – Methods to prevent destructive asteroid hits
- B612 Foundation – Planetary defense nonprofit organization
- Deep Impact (spacecraft) – NASA space probe launched in 2005
- Don Quijote (spacecraft) – Space probe concept
- NEO Surveyor – Space-based infrared telescope
- The Spaceguard Foundation – Organization studying near-Earth objects
