= Dimorphos =

Moon of asteroid Didymos

- Dimorphos as seen by the DART spacecraft seconds before impact in 2022. The asteroid's north pole points toward the top of the image.

Discovery
- Discovered by: Petr Pravec et al. (Note: Astronomers involved in the discovery of Dimorphos include P. Pravec, L.A.M. Benner, M.C. Nolan, P. Kusnirak, D. Pray, J.D. Giorgini, R.F. Jurgens, S.J. Ostro, J.-L. Margot, C. Magri, A. Grauer, and S. Larson. The discovery used lightcurve and radar observations from the Jet Propulsion Laboratory, Pasadena, CA; National Astronomy and Ionosphere Center / Arecibo Observatory, Arecibo, PR; and Ondrejov Observatory, Ondřejov, CZ.)
- Discovery site: Ondřejov Observatory
- Discovery date: 20 November 2003

Designations
- Designation: Didymos I
- Pronunciation: /daɪˈmɔːrfəs/ dy-MOR-fəs
- Named after: Greek word for "having two forms"
- Alternative names: S/2003 (65803) 1 Didymos B "Didymoon"

Orbital characteristics
- Epoch 26 September 2022 23:14:24.183 UTC (JD 2459849.4683355; impact time)
- Semi-major axis: 1.206±0.035 km (pre-impact); 1.144±0.070 km (post-impact)
- Eccentricity: ≈0 (pre-impact); 0.021±0.014 or 0.0247±0.0002 (post-impact)
- Orbital period (sidereal): 11.921473±0.000044 hr (11h 55m 17.3s ± 0.2s; pre-impact); 11.3676±0.0014 hr (11h 22m 03.4s ± 5.0s; post-impact)
- Average orbital speed: 0.177 m/s (pre-impact) (Note: For a circular orbit with negligible eccentricity, as in the case of Dimorphos, the mean orbital speed can be approximated by the time T it takes to complete one revolution around its orbital circumference, with the radius being its semi-major axis a: $v = {2 \pi a \over T}$.)
- Inclination: 169.3°±1.0° with respect to ecliptic (Note: Thomas et al. (2023) give Dimorphos's orbit pole orientation in terms of ecliptic coordinates, where λ is ecliptic longitude and β is ecliptic latitude. β is the angular offset from the ecliptic plane, whereas inclination i with respect to the ecliptic is the angular offset of the orbital pole from the ecliptic north pole, at β = +90° ; i with respect to the ecliptic would be the complement of β. Therefore, given β = –79.3° , i = 90° – (–79.3°) = 169.3° from the ecliptic.)
- Satellite of: 65803 Didymos

Physical characteristics
- Dimensions: 177 × 174 × 116 m (± 2 × 4 × 2 m)
- Mean diameter: 151±5 m (volume equivalent)
- Surface area: 7.58×10^{4} m^{2}
- Volume: (1.81±0.18)×10^{6} m^{3}
- Mass: (1.33±0.30)×10^{9} kg (if density is 0.6–0.7 g/cm^{3}) ≈ 4.3×10^{9} kg (if same density as Didymos)
- Mean density: 0.6–0.7 g/cm^{3} 2.40±0.30 g/cm^{3} (if same as Didymos)
- Synodic rotation period: ≈ 11.9 hr (synchronous; pre-impact) chaotic (post-impact)
- Albedo: 0.15±0.02
- Spectral type: S
- Absolute magnitude (H): 21.4±0.2 (Note: Absolute magnitude of Dimorphos calculated from the addition of its magnitude difference to Didymos's absolute magnitude: 18.07 + 3.29 ≈ 21.4.)

Dimorphos (formal designation (65803) Didymos I; provisional designation S/2003 (65803) 1) is a natural satellite or moon of the near-Earth asteroid 65803 Didymos, with which it forms a binary system. The moon was discovered on 20 November 2003 by Petr Pravec in collaboration with other astronomers worldwide. Dimorphos has a diameter of 177 meters (581 ft) across its longest extent.

Dimorphos is the second smallest asteroid photographed and visited by a spacecraft, after Kamoʻoalewa. It was the target of the Double Asteroid Redirection Test (DART), a NASA space mission that deliberately collided a spacecraft with the moon on 26 September 2022 to alter its orbit around Didymos. Before the impact by DART, Dimorphos had a shape of an oblate spheroid with a surface covered in boulders but virtually no craters. The moon is thought to have formed when Didymos shed its mass due to its rapid rotation, which formed an orbiting ring of debris that conglomerated into a low-density rubble pile that became Dimorphos today.

The DART impact reduced Dimorphos's orbital period around Didymos by 33 minutes and ejected over 1 million kilograms (2.2×10^{6} lb) of debris into space, producing a dust plume that temporarily brightened the Didymos system and developed a 10,000-kilometer (6,200 mi)-long dust tail that persisted for several months. The DART impact is predicted to have caused global resurfacing and deformation of Dimorphos's shape, leaving an impact crater several tens of meters in diameter. Post-impact observations of brightness fluctuations within the Didymos system suggest that the impact may have either significantly deformed Dimorphos into an ellipsoidal shape or may have sent it into a chaotically tumbling rotation. If Dimorphos was in a tumbling rotation state, the moon will be subjected to irregular tidal forces by Didymos before it will eventually return to a tidally locked state within several decades. The ESA mission Hera arrived at the Didymos system in 2026 to further study the effects of DART's impact on Dimorphos.

== Discovery ==
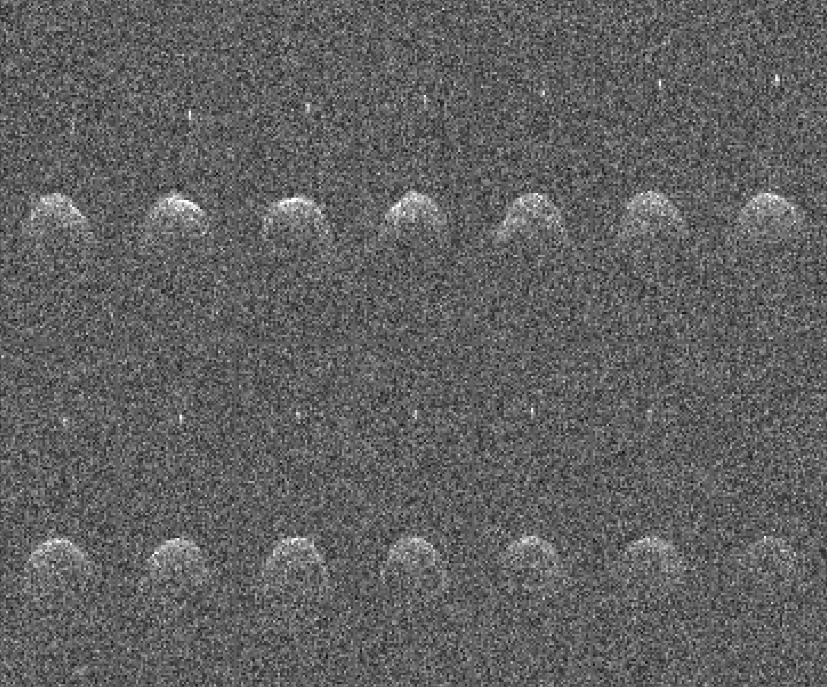
Radar images of Didymos and Dimorphos taken by the Arecibo Observatory in 2003

The primary asteroid Didymos was discovered in 1996 by Joe Montani of the Spacewatch Project at the University of Arizona. The satellite Dimorphos was discovered on 20 November 2003, in photometric observations by Petr Pravec and colleagues at the Ondřejov Observatory in the Czech Republic. Dimorphos was detected through periodic dips in Didymos's brightness due to mutual eclipses and occultations. With his collaborators, he confirmed from the Arecibo radar delay-Doppler images that Didymos is a binary system.

== Naming ==
The Working Group for Small Bodies Nomenclature of the International Astronomical Union (IAU) gave the satellite its official name on 23 June 2020. The name Dimorphos is derived from a Greek word (Δίμορφος) meaning 'having two forms'. (Note: The name Dimorphos was suggested by planetary scientist Kleomenis Tsiganis at the Aristotle University of Thessaloniki. Tsiganis explained that the name "has been chosen in anticipation of its changes: It will be known to us in two very different forms, the one seen by DART before the impact, and the other seen by Hera a few years later.") The justification for the new name reads: "As the target of the DART and Hera space missions, it will become the first celestial body in cosmic history whose form was substantially changed as a result of human intervention (the DART impact)". The name was suggested by Kleomenis Tsiganis, a planetary scientist at the Aristotle University of Thessaloniki and a member of both the DART and Hera teams. Prior to the IAU naming, the nickname Didymoon was used in official communications.

== Origin ==
Dimorphos has a surface age of less than 0.3 million years, which is small in comparison to its parent object Didymos's surface age of ~12.5 million years. Madeira et al. (2023) proposed that Dimorphos formed because of the YORP effect, speeding Didymos's spin rate until it ejected matter from its equator to make a ring, which was about 25% the mass of Didymos. That ring would then become moonlets; a fraction of the mass of the ring would become Dimorphos and a set of objects outside of the Roche limit. After that, most of the ring's mass would come back to Didymos.

== Exploration ==
On 24 November 2021, NASA and the Applied Physics Laboratory launched an impactor spacecraft towards Dimorphos as part of their Double Asteroid Redirection Test (DART). DART was the first experiment conducted in space to test asteroid deflection as a method of defending Earth from potentially hazardous asteroids. Following a ten-month journey to the Didymos system, the impactor collided with Dimorphos on 26 September 2022 at a speed of around 24,000 kilometers per hour (15,000 miles per hour). The collision successfully decreased Dimorphos's orbital period around Didymos by 32±2 minutes. Fifteen days prior to its collision, the impactor released LICIACube, an Italian Space Agency CubeSat that photographed the impact and the resulting dust plume as it performed a close flyby of the Didymos system. Spacecraft and observatories such as Hubble, James Webb, Lucy, SAAO and ATLAS also captured the dust plume trailing the Didymos system in the days following the impact. As part of its Hera mission, ESA launched three spacecraft to the Didymos system in 2024 to reach this asteroid system in November 2026 to further study the aftermath of the impact.

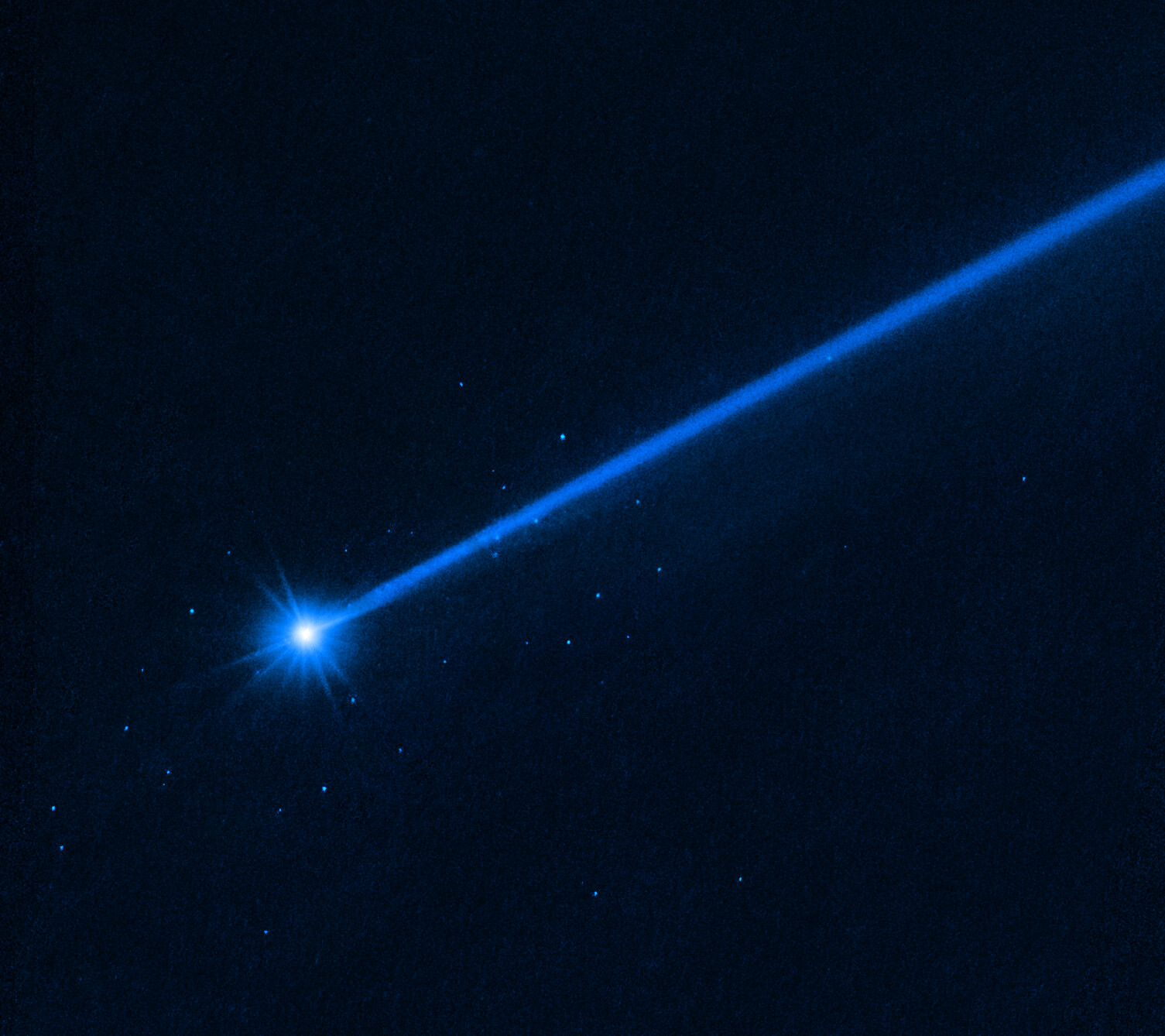
A trail of dust streams from Dimorphos in this Hubble Space Telescope photo taken about three months after the collision. The asteroid is surrounded by blue dots, which are boulders ranging from 1 to 6.7 metres across that were ejected by the impact.

The DART impact on the center of Dimorphos decreased the orbital period, previously 11.92 hours, by 33±1 minutes. This large change indicates the recoil from material excavated from the asteroid and ejected into space by the impact (known as ejecta) contributed significant momentum change to the asteroid, beyond that of the DART spacecraft itself. Researchers found the impact caused an instantaneous slowing in Dimorphos's speed along its orbit of about 2.7 millimeters per second — again indicating the recoil from ejecta played a major role in amplifying the momentum change directly imparted to the asteroid by the spacecraft. That momentum change was amplified by a factor of 2.2 to 4.9 (depending on the mass of Dimorphos), indicating the momentum change transferred because of ejecta production significantly exceeded the momentum change from the DART spacecraft alone. While the orbital change was small, the change is in the velocity and over the course of years will accumulate to a large change in position. For a hypothetical Earth-threatening body, even such a tiny change could be sufficient to mitigate or prevent an impact, if applied early enough. As the diameter of Earth is around 13,000 kilometers, a hypothetical asteroid impact could be avoided with as little of a shift as half of that (6,500 kilometers). A 2 cm/s velocity change accumulates to that distance in approximately 10 years.

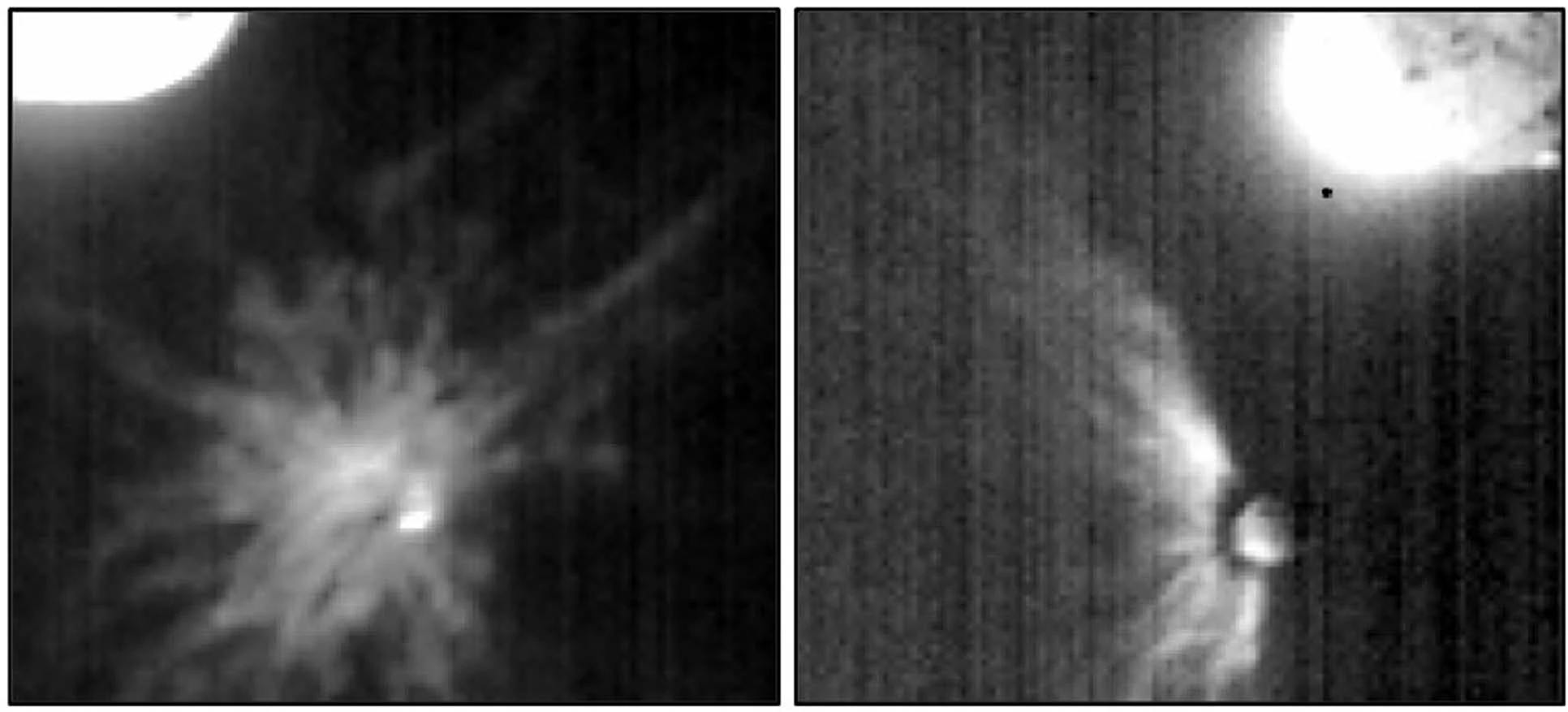
DART impact seen by LICIACube

By smashing into the asteroid DART made Dimorphos an active asteroid. Scientists had proposed that some active asteroids are the result of impact events, but no one had ever observed the activation of an asteroid. The DART mission activated Dimorphos under precisely known and carefully observed impact conditions, enabling the detailed study of the formation of an active asteroid for the first time. Observations show that Dimorphos lost approximately 1 million kilograms after the collision. Impact produced a dust plume that temporarily brightened the Didymos system and developed a 10,000-kilometer (6,200 mi)-long dust tail that persisted for several months. The DART impact is predicted to have caused global resurfacing and deformation of Dimorphos's shape, leaving an impact crater several tens of meters in diameter. The impact has likely sent Dimorphos into a chaotically tumbling rotation that will subject the moon to irregular tidal forces by Didymos before it will eventually return to a tidally locked state within several decades. Additionally, the impact changed Dimorphos's shape from a roughly symmetrical "oblate spheroid" to "a flat-topped oval", or "triaxial ellipsoid".

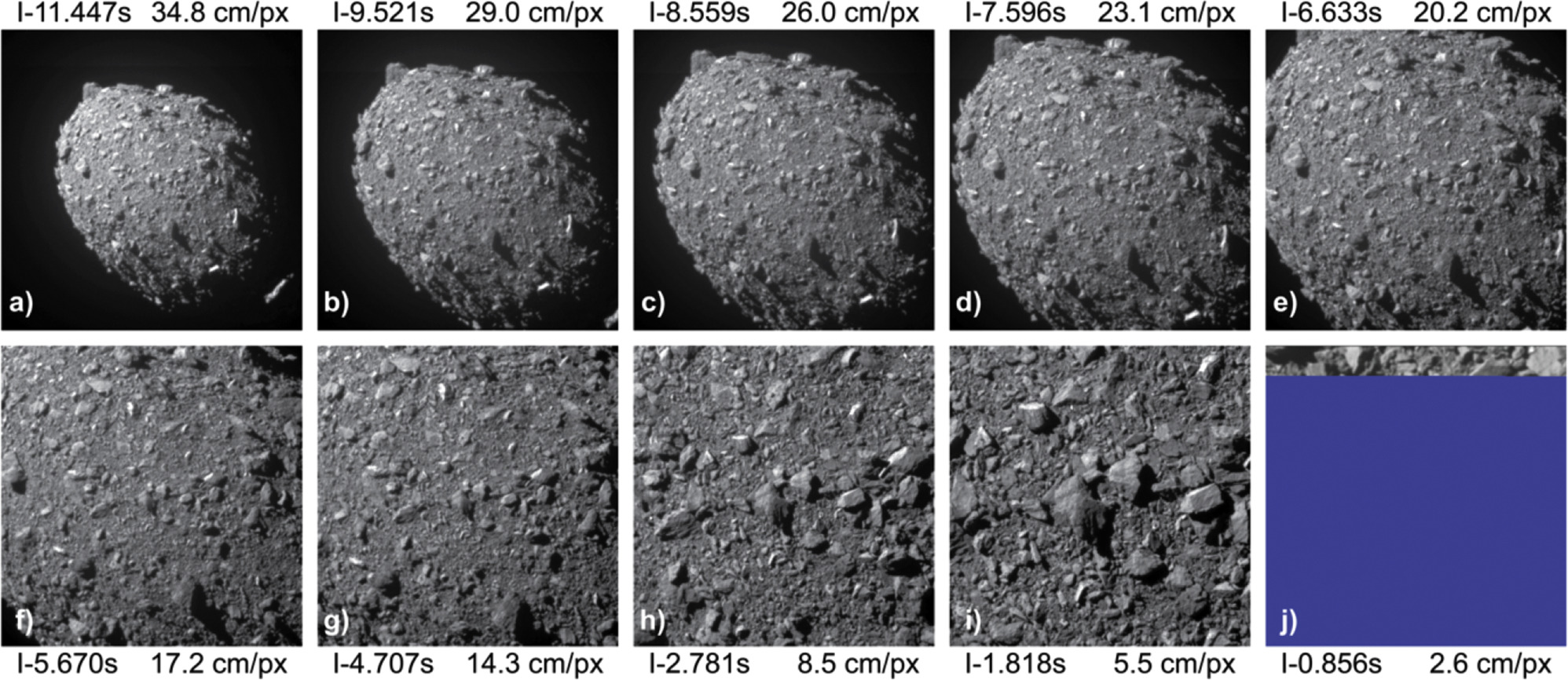
DART spacecraft's final images of Dimorphos, (from 11.5 seconds before impact).

== Size and shape ==
Dimorphos is approximately 170 meters (560 ft) in diameter, compared to Didymos at 780 meters (2,560 ft). Dimorphos does not have a confirmed mass, but it is estimated to be about 5×10^{9} kg (5.5 million tons), or about the same mass and size as the Great Pyramid of Giza, when assuming a density of 2.17 g/cm^{3} similar to Didymos. It is one of the smallest celestial objects given a formal name by the IAU, after 367943 Duende and 469219 Kamoʻoalewa.

The final few minutes of pictures from the DART mission revealed an egg-shaped body covered with boulders, suggesting it has a rubble pile structure.

== Surface ==
Five boulders (saxa) and six craters have been given names of traditional drums from several cultures. They are approximately 10 meters across or smaller:

Named features
Name	Pronunciation	Feature	Named after	Date approved
Atabaque Saxum	UK: /ˌætəˈbæki/ AT-ə-BAK-ee; US: /ˌɑːtəˈbɑːki/ AH-tə-BAH-kee	boulder	atabaque (Brazil)	25 Jan 2023
Bodhran Saxum	/ˈbɔːrɑːn/ BOR-ahn	boulder	bodhrán (Ireland)	25 Jan 2023
Caccavella Saxum	/ˌkækəˈvɛlə/ KAK-ə-VEL-ə	boulder	caccavella a.k.a. putipù (Italy)	25 Jan 2023
Dhol Saxum	/ˈdɔːl/ DAWL	boulder	dhol (India)	25 Jan 2023
Pūniu Saxum	/ˈpuːni.uː/ POO-nee-oo	boulder	pūniu a.k.a. kilu (Hawaii)	25 Jan 2023
Bala Crater	/ˈbælə/ BAL-ə	crater	balafon (Guinea, Senegal, Mali)	14 Nov 2023
Bongo Crater	/ˈbɒŋɡoʊ/ BONG-goh	crater	bongo (Cuba)	14 Nov 2023
Marimba Crater	/məˈrɪmbə/ mə-RIM-bə	crater	marimba (Central America)	14 Nov 2023
Msondo Crater	/ɛmˈsɒndoʊ/ em-SON-doh	crater	msondo (Tanzania)	14 Nov 2023
Naqqara Crater	/næˈkɑːrə/ na-KAR-ə	crater	naqqara (naker) (Mid East and India)	14 Nov 2023
Tamboril Crater	/ˌtæmbəˈrɪl/ TAM-bər-IL	crater	tamboril (Uruguay, Candombe)	14 Nov 2023

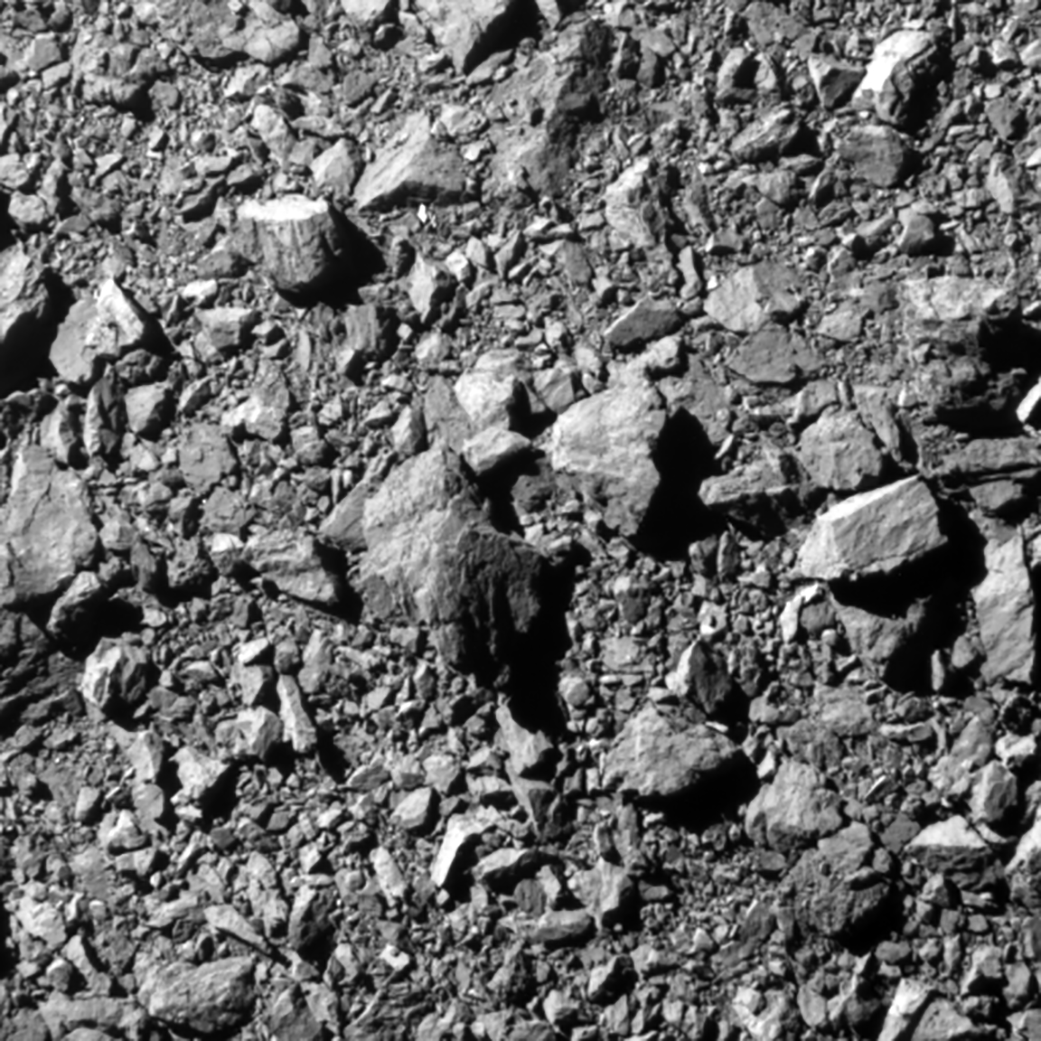
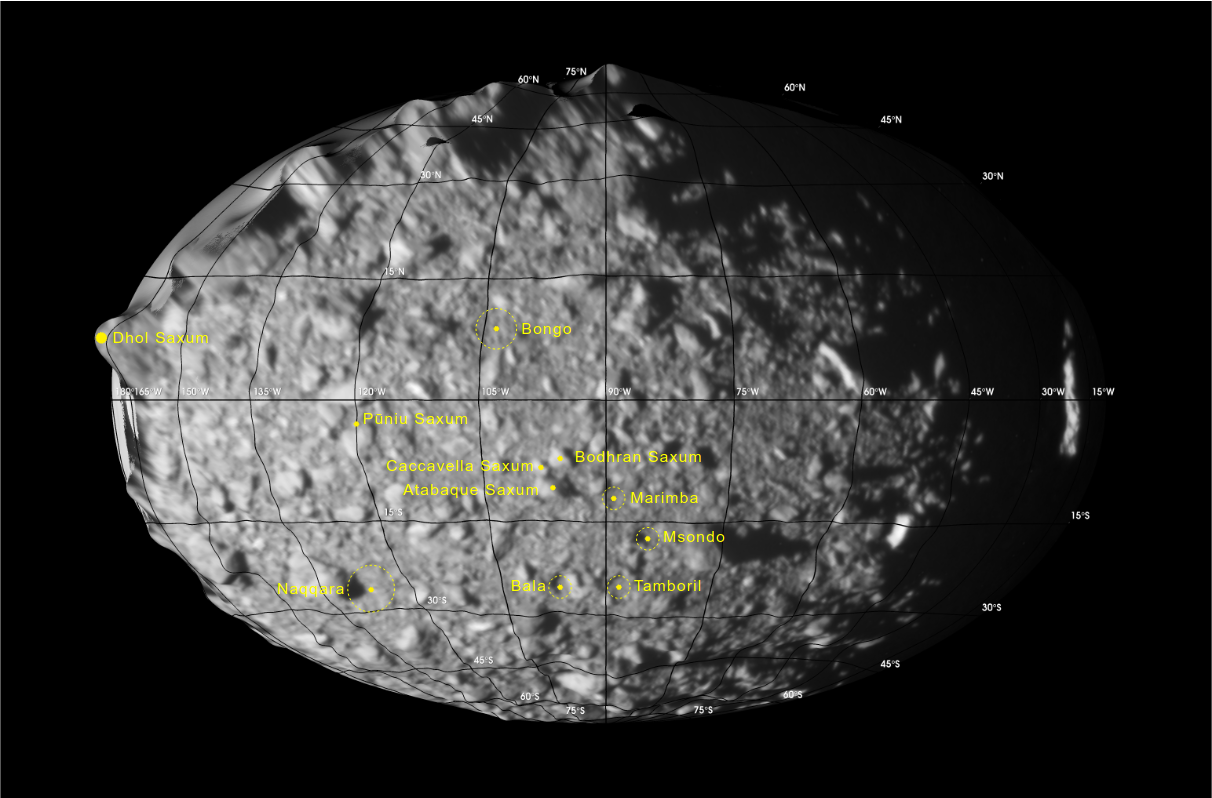
Left: Surface of Dimorphos, captured by DART two seconds before impact. Right: Composite map of Dimorphos with named features.

== Orbit and rotation ==
Animation of DART around Didymos - Impact on Dimorphos DART · Didymos · Dimorphos

The primary body of the binary system, Didymos, orbits the Sun at a distance of 1.0 to 2.3 AU once every 770 days (2 years and 1 month). The pathway of the orbit has an eccentricity of 0.38 and an inclination of 3° with respect to the ecliptic. On 4 October 2022 Didymos made an Earth approach of 10.6 million km (6.6 million mi). Dimorphos moves in a nearly equatorial, nearly circular orbit around Didymos, with an orbital period of 11.9 hours. Its orbit period is synchronous with its rotation, so that the same side of Dimorphos always faces Didymos. Dimorphos's orbit is retrograde relative to the ecliptic plane, in conformity with Didymos's retrograde rotation.

Dimorphos's rotation is being slowed down by the YORP effect, with an estimated rotation period doubling time of 86,000 years. However, because it is in orbit around Didymos, tidal forces keep the moon locked in synchronous rotation.

== See also ==
- 354P/LINEAR – a main-belt asteroid that was naturally impacted by another asteroid sometime before 2010
- P/2016 G1 (PanSTARRS) – another main-belt asteroid that was impacted by an asteroid in 2016
