= Pan-STARRS =

Multi-telescope astronomical survey

- Pan-STARRS logo
- Alternative names: Panoramic Survey Telescope and Rapid Response System
- Coordinates: 20°42′26″N 156°15′21″W
- Website: pswww.ifa.hawaii.edu/pswww/
- Related media on Commons

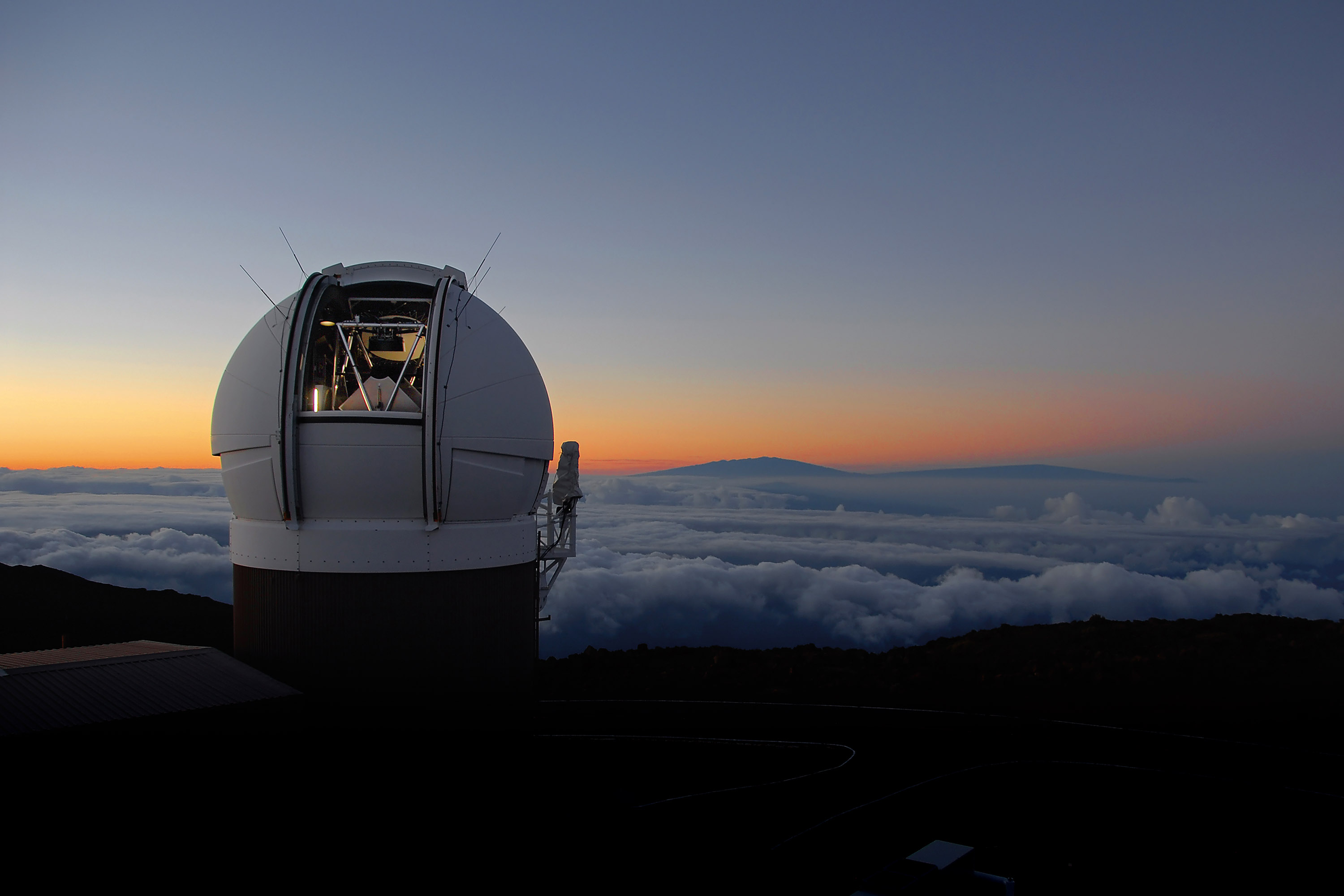
For four years beginning in May 2010, the Pan-STARRS observatory surveyed the entire three-quarters of the sky visible from Hawaii many times in many colors of light. One of the survey's goals was to look for moving objects and transient or variable objects, including asteroids that could potentially threaten the Earth.

The Panoramic Survey Telescope and Rapid Response System (Pan-STARRS1; obs. code: F51 and Pan-STARRS2 obs. code: F52) located at Haleakalā Observatory, Hawaii, US, consists of astronomical cameras, telescopes and a computing facility that is surveying the sky for moving or variable objects on a continual basis, and also producing accurate astrometry and photometry of already-detected objects. In January 2019 the second Pan-STARRS data release was announced. At 1.6 petabytes, it is the largest volume of astronomical data ever released.

== Description ==
Number of NEOs detected by various projects: LINEAR; NEAT; Spacewatch; LONEOS; CSS / Pan-STARRS; NEOWISE; ATLAS; Other-US; Others

The Pan-STARRS Project is a collaboration between the University of Hawaiʻi Institute for Astronomy, MIT Lincoln Laboratory, Maui High Performance Computing Center and Science Applications International Corporation. Telescope construction was funded by the U.S. Air Force.

By detecting differences from previous observations of the same areas of the sky, Pan-STARRS is discovering many new asteroids, comets, variable stars, supernovae and other celestial objects. Its primary mission is now to detect Near-Earth Objects that threaten impact events and it is expected to create a database of all objects visible from Hawaii (three-quarters of the entire sky) down to apparent magnitude 24. Construction of Pan-STARRS was funded in large part by the U.S. Air Force Research Laboratory. Additional funding to complete Pan-STARRS2 came from the NASA Near Earth Object Observation Program, which also supplies most of the funding to operate the telescopes. The Pan-STARRS NEO survey searches all the sky north of declination −47.5.

The first Pan-STARRS telescope (PS1) is located at the summit of Haleakalā on Maui, Hawaii, on 30 June 2006 and went online on 6 December 2008 under the administration of the University of Hawaiʻi. PS1 began full-time science observations on 13 May 2010 and the PS1 Science Mission ran until March 2014. Operations were funded by the PS1 Science Consortium, PS1SC, a consortium including the Max Planck Society in Germany, National Central University in Taiwan, Edinburgh, Durham and Queen's Belfast Universities in the UK, and Johns Hopkins and Harvard Universities in the United States and the Las Cumbres Observatory Global Telescope Network. Consortium observations for the all sky (as visible from Hawaii) survey were completed in April 2014.

Having completed PS1, the Pan-STARRS Project focused on building Pan-STARRS 2 (PS2), for which first light was achieved in 2013, with full science operations scheduled for 2014 and then the full array of four telescopes, sometimes called PS4. Completing the array of four telescopes is estimated at a total cost of US$100 million for the entire array.

As of mid-2014, Pan-STARRS 2 was in the process of being commissioned. In the wake of substantial funding problems, no clear timeline existed for additional telescopes beyond the second. In March 2018, Pan-STARRS 2 was credited by the Minor Planet Center for the discovery of the potentially hazardous Apollo asteroid (515767) 2015 JA_{2}, its first minor planet discovery made at Haleakalā on 13 May 2015.

== Instruments ==
As of 2025 Pan-STARRS consists of two 1.8-m Ritchey–Chrétien telescopes located at Haleakalā in Hawaii.

The initial telescope, PS1, saw first light using a low-resolution camera in June 2006. The telescope has a 3° field of view, which is extremely large for telescopes of this size, and is equipped with what was the largest digital camera ever built, recording almost 1.4 billion pixels per image. The focal plane has 60 separately mounted close packed CCDs arranged in an 8 × 8 array. The corner positions are not populated, as the optics do not illuminate the corners. Each CCD device, called an Orthogonal Transfer Array (OTA), has 4800 × 4800 pixels, separated into 64 cells, each of 600 × 600 pixels. This gigapixel camera or 'GPC' saw first light on 22 August 2007, imaging the Andromeda Galaxy.

After initial technical difficulties that were later mostly solved, PS1 began full operation on 13 May 2010. Nick Kaiser, principal investigator of the Pan-STARRS project, summed it up, saying, "PS1 has been taking science-quality data for six months, but now we are doing it dusk-to-dawn every night." The PS1 images, however, remain slightly less sharp than initially planned, which significantly affects some scientific uses of the data.

Each image requires about 2 gigabytes of storage and exposure times will be 30 to 60 seconds (enough to record objects down to apparent magnitude 22), with an additional minute or so used for computer processing. Since images are taken on a continuous basis, about 10 terabytes of data are acquired by PS1 every night. Comparing against a database of known unvarying objects compiled from earlier observations will yield objects of interest: anything that has changed brightness and/or position for any reason. As of June 30, 2010, University of Hawaiʻi in Honolulu received an $8.4 million contract modification under the PanSTARRS multi-year program to develop and deploy a telescope data management system for the project.

The very large field of view of the telescopes and the relatively short exposure times enable approximately 6000 square degrees of sky to be imaged every night. The entire sky is 4π steradians, or 4π × (180/π)^{2} ≈ 41,253.0 square degrees, of which about 30,000 square degrees are visible from Hawaii, which means that the entire sky can be imaged in a period of 40 hours (or about 10 hours per night on four days). Given the need to avoid times when the Moon is bright, this means that an area equivalent to the entire sky will be surveyed four times a month, which is entirely unprecedented. By the end of its initial three-year mission in April 2014, PS1 had imaged the sky 12 times in each of 5 filters ('g', 'r', 'i', 'z', and 'y'). Filters 'g', 'r', and 'i' have the bandpasses of the Sloan Digital Sky Survey (SDSS) filters. (Midpoints and bandwidths at half maximum are 464 nm and 128 nm, 658 nm and 138 nm, and 806 nm and 149 nm, respectively.) The'z' filter has the SDSS midpoint (900 nm), but its longwave cutoff avoids water absorptions bands beginning at 930 nm. The shortwave cutoff of the 'y' filter is set by the water absorption bands that end around 960 nm. The longwave cutoff band is currently at 1030 nm to avoid the worst of the detector sensitivity to temperature variations.

== Science ==
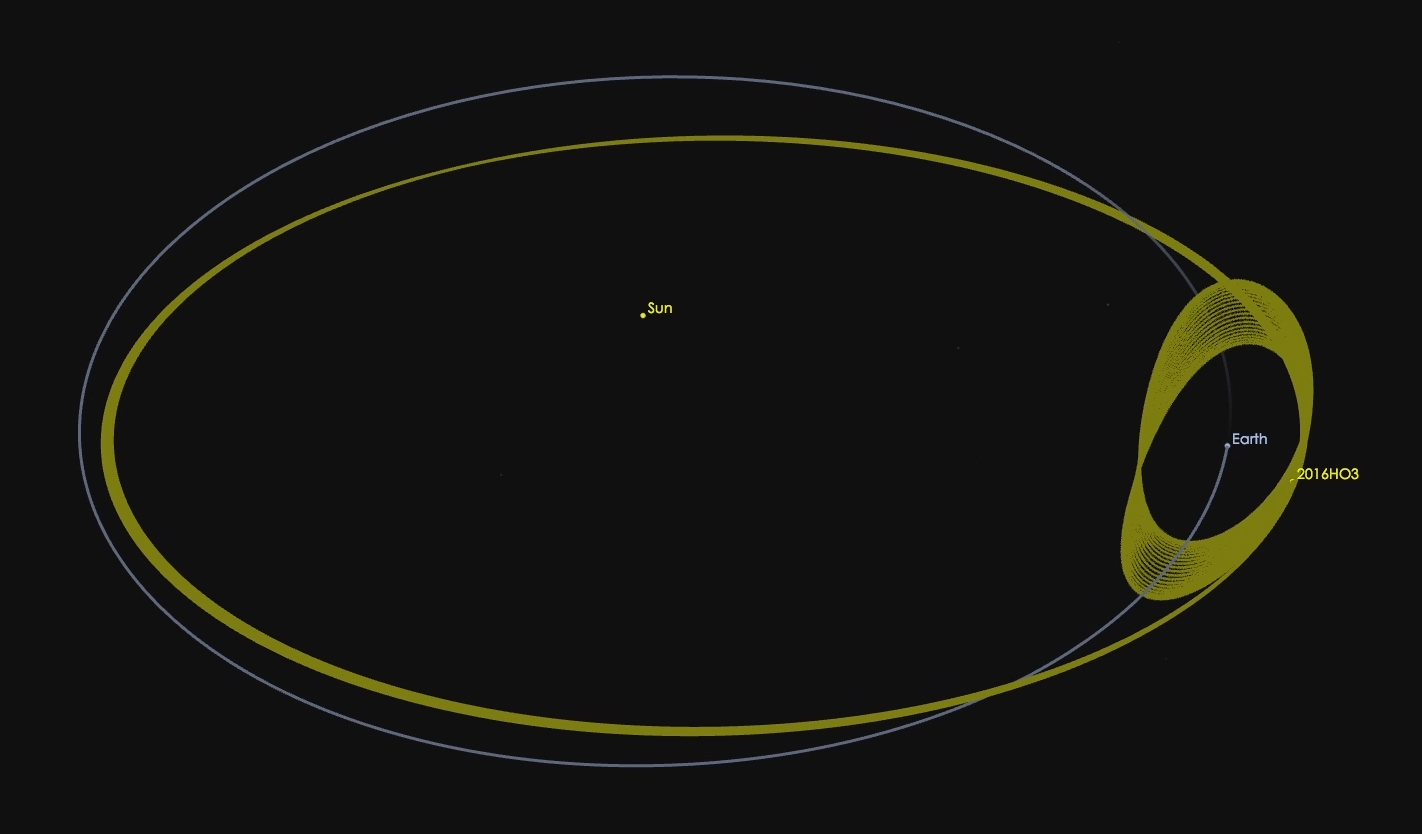
Asteroid 469219 Kamoʻoalewa has an orbit around the Sun that keeps it as a constant companion of Earth. Credit: NASA/JPL-Caltech

Pan-STARRS is currently mostly funded by a grant from the NASA Near Earth Object Observations program. It therefore spends 90% of its observing time in dedicated searches for Near Earth Objects.

Systematically surveying the entire sky on a continuous basis is an unprecedented project and is expected to produce a dramatically larger number of discoveries of various types of celestial objects. For instance, the current leading asteroid discovery survey, the Mount Lemmon Survey, (Note: Mt. Lemmon Survey (G96) is a part of Catalina Sky Survey, another two parts are Siding Spring Survey (E12) and Catalina Sky Survey (703) itself.) reaches an apparent magnitude of 22 V. Pan-STARRS will go about one magnitude fainter and cover the entire sky visible from Hawaii. The ongoing survey will also complement the efforts to map the infrared sky by the NASA WISE orbital telescope, with the results of one survey complementing and extending the other.

The second data release, Pan-STARRS DR2, announced in January 2019, is the largest volume of astronomical data ever released. At over 1.6 petabytes of images, it is equivalent to 30,000 times the text content of Wikipedia. The data reside in the Mikulski Archive for Space Telescopes (MAST).

=== Military limitations (until end 2011) ===
According to Defense Industry Daily, significant limitations were put on the PS1 survey to avoid recording sensitive objects. Streak detection software (known as "Magic") was used to censor pixels containing information about satellites in the image. Early versions of this software were immature, leaving a fill factor of 68% of the full field of view (which figure includes gaps between the detectors), but by March 2010 this had improved to 76%, a small reduction from the approximately 80% available.

At the end of 2011, the USAF completely eliminated the masking requirement (for all images, past and future). Thus, with the exception of a few non-functioning OTA cells, the entire field of view can be used.

=== Solar System ===
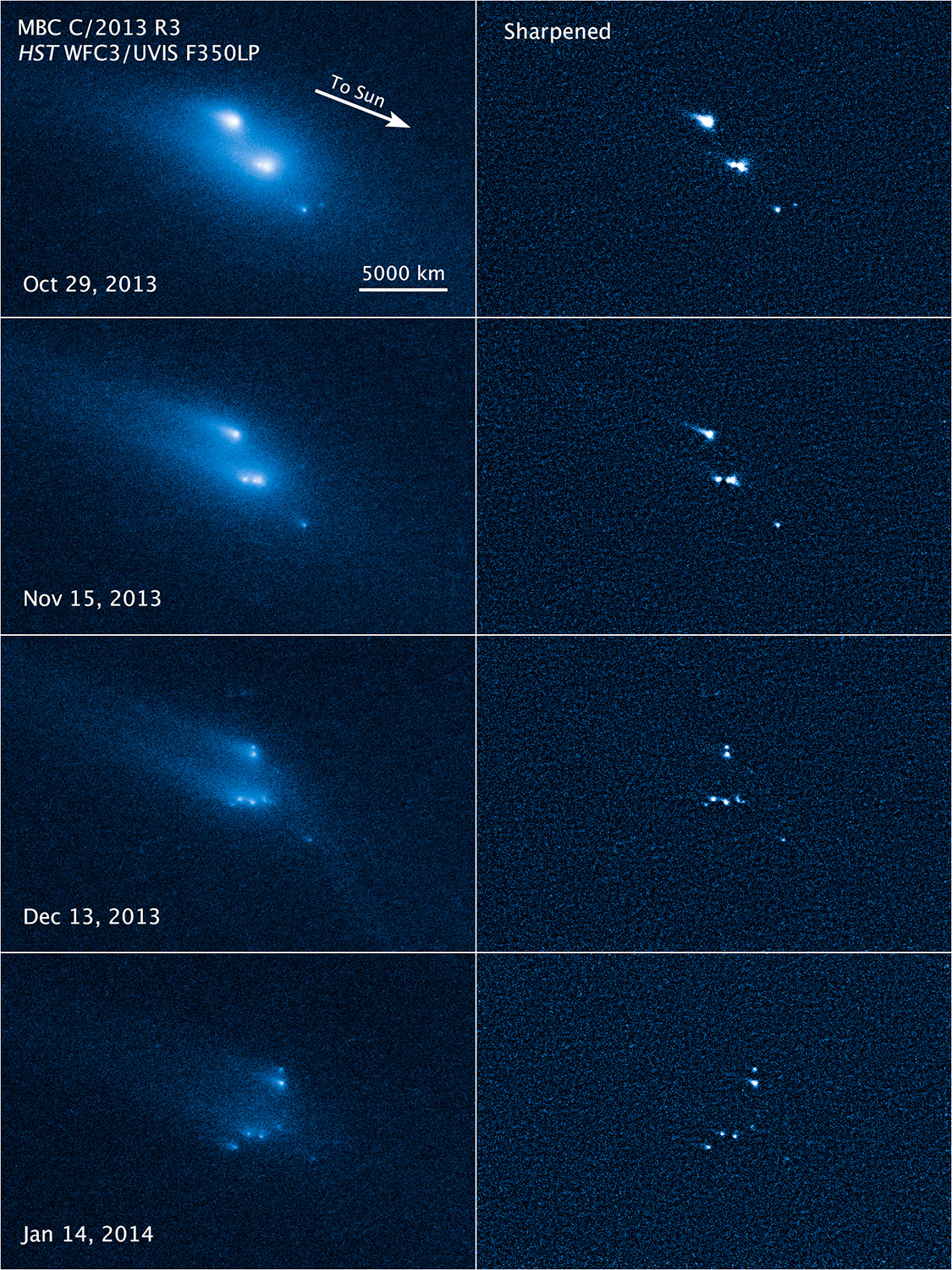
Disintegration of main-belt comet P/2013 R3 observed by the Hubble Space Telescope (6 March 2014)

In addition to the large number of expected discoveries in the asteroid belt, Pan-STARRS is expected to detect at least 100,000 Jupiter trojans (compared to 2900 known as of end-2008); at least 20,000 Kuiper belt objects (compared to 800 known as of mid-2005); thousands of trojan asteroids of Saturn, Uranus, and Neptune (currently eight Neptune trojans are known, none for Saturn, and one for Uranus); and large numbers of centaurs and comets.

Apart from dramatically adding to the number of known Solar System objects, Pan-STARRS will remove or mitigate the observational bias inherent in many current surveys. For instance, among currently known objects there is a bias favoring low orbital inclination, and thus an object such as Makemake escaped detection until recently despite its bright apparent magnitude of 17, which is not much fainter than Pluto. Also, among currently known comets, there is a bias favoring those with short perihelion distances. Reducing the effects of this observational bias will enable a more complete picture of Solar System dynamics. For instance, it is expected that the number of Jupiter trojans larger than 1 km may in fact roughly match the number of asteroid-belt objects, although the currently known population of the latter is several orders of magnitude larger. Pan-STARRS data will elegantly complement the WISE (infrared) survey. WISE infrared images will permit an estimate of size for asteroids and trojan objects tracked over longer periods of time by Pan-STARRS.

In 2017, Pan-STARRS detected the first known interstellar object, 1I/2017 U1 'Oumuamua, passing through the Solar System. During the formation of a planetary system, it is thought that a very large number of objects are ejected due to gravitational interactions with planets (as many as 10^{13} such objects in the case of the Solar System). Objects ejected from planetary systems of other stars might plausibly be throughout the Milky Way and some may pass through the Solar System.

Pan-STARRS may detect collisions involving small asteroids. These are quite rare and none have yet been observed, but with a dramatic increase in the number of asteroids discovered it is expected from statistical considerations that some collision events may be observed.

In November 2019, a review of images from Pan-STARRS revealed that the telescope had captured the disintegration of asteroid P/2016 G1. The 1,300 feet (400 m) asteroid was struck by a smaller object, and gradually fell apart. Astronomers speculate that the object that struck the asteroid may have massed only 1 kilogram (2.2 lb), traveling at 11,000 miles per hour (18,000 km/h).

=== Beyond the Solar System ===
It is expected that Pan-STARRS will discover an extremely large number of variable stars, including such stars in other nearby galaxies; this may lead to the discovery of previously unknown dwarf galaxies. In discovering numerous Cepheid variables and eclipsing binary stars, it will help determine distances to nearby galaxies with greater precision. It is expected to discover many Type Ia supernovae in other galaxies, which are important in studying the effects of dark energy, and also optical afterglows of gamma ray bursts.

Because very young stars (such as T Tauri stars) are usually variable, Pan-STARRS should discover many of these and improve our understanding of them. It is also expected that Pan-STARRS may discover many extrasolar planets by observing their transits across their parent stars, as well as gravitational microlensing events.

Pan-STARRS will also measure proper motion and parallax and should thereby discover many brown dwarfs, white dwarfs, and other nearby faint objects, and it should be able to conduct a complete census of all stars within 100 parsecs of the Sun. Prior proper motion and parallax surveys often did not detect faint objects such as the recently discovered Teegarden's star, which are too faint for projects such as Hipparcos.

Also, by identifying stars with large parallax but very small proper motion for follow-up radial velocity measurements, Pan-STARRS may even be able to permit the detection of hypothetical Nemesis-type objects if these actually exist.

=== Selected discoveries ===
Designation	Reported / Discovered	Comments	
2010 ST_{3}	16 September 2010	this NEA, which at the time of discovery had a very slight possibility of colliding with Earth in 2098, was discovered by Pan-STARRS on 16 September 2010. This is the first NEA to be discovered by the Pan-STARRS program. The object is 30–65 meters across, similar to the Tunguska impactor that hit Russia in 1908. It passed within about 6 million kilometers of Earth in mid-October 2010.	01
2012 GX17	14 April 2012	this faint ~22nd-magnitude object was initially considered a promising Neptune L_{5} trojan candidate.	02
2013 ND15	13 July 2013	this object is probably the first known Venus L_{4} trojan.	03
C/2011 L4	6 June 2011	astronomers at the University of Hawaiʻi using the Pan-STARRS Telescope discovered comet C/2011 L4 in June 2011. At the time of discovery it was about 1.2 billion kilometers from the Sun, placing it beyond the orbit of Jupiter. The comet became visible to the naked eye when it was near perihelion in March 2013. It most likely originated in the Oort cloud, a cloud of comet-like objects located in the distant outer Solar System. It was probably gravitationally disturbed by a distant passing star, sending it on a long journey toward the Sun.	04
PS1-10afx	31 August 2010	a unique hydrogen-deficient superluminous supernova (SLSN) at redshift z = 1.388. Discovered first in MDS imaging on 31 August 2010. The overluminosity was later found to be the result of gravitational lensing.	05
PS1-10jh	31 May 2010	the tidal disruption of a star by a supermassive black hole.	06
P/2010 T2	16 October 2010	this faint ~20th-magnitude object is the first comet to be discovered by the Pan-STARRS program. Even at perihelion in the summer of 2011 at 3.73 AU it will only be magnitude 19.5. It has an orbital period of 13.2 years and is a member of the short-period Jupiter family of comets.	07
P/2012 B1	25 January 2012	a Pan-STARRS discovery	08
P/2012 T1	6 October 2012	a Pan-STARRS discovery, is one of the very few known main-belt comets.	09
C/2013 P2	4 August 2013	a Pan-STARRS discovery, Manx Comet from Oort cloud, orbital period greater than 51 million years.	10
P/2013 R3	15 September 2013	a Pan-STARRS discovery, disintegration observed by the Hubble Space Telescope.	11
C/2014 S3	22 September 2014	a rocky comet (PANSTARRS).	12
(636872) 2014 YX49	26 December 2014	a Trojan of Uranus, the second one ever announced.	13
SN 2008id	3 November 2008	a type Ia supernova, confirmed by Keck observatory via redshift.	14
469219 Kamoʻoalewa	27 April 2016	possibly the most stable quasi-satellite of Earth.	15
2016 UR36	25 October 2016	a NEO – seen 5 days out.	16
C/2017 K2	21 May 2017	a new comet with a hyperbolic orbit and escape velocity.	17
1I/2017 U1 'Oumuamua	19 October 2017	the first observation of an interstellar object.	18
(515767) 2015 JA_{2}	31 March 2018	Pan-STARRS 2 (PS2) first minor-planet discovery (made on 13 May 2015) credited by the Minor Planet Center on numbering in March 2018.	19
P/2016 G1	6 March 2016	first observed disintegration of an asteroid, following a collision.	20
2020 MK4	24 June 2020	Centaur	21
2023 FW13	28 March 2023	a quasi-satellite of Earth, potentially even more stable than 469219 Kamoʻoalewa above.	22

== See also ==
- C/2014 G3
- Vera C. Rubin Observatory
- List of near-Earth object observation projects
- Zwicky Transient Facility
