= C/2014 S3 (PanSTARRS) =

Long-period comet

C/2014 S3 (PANSTARRS)
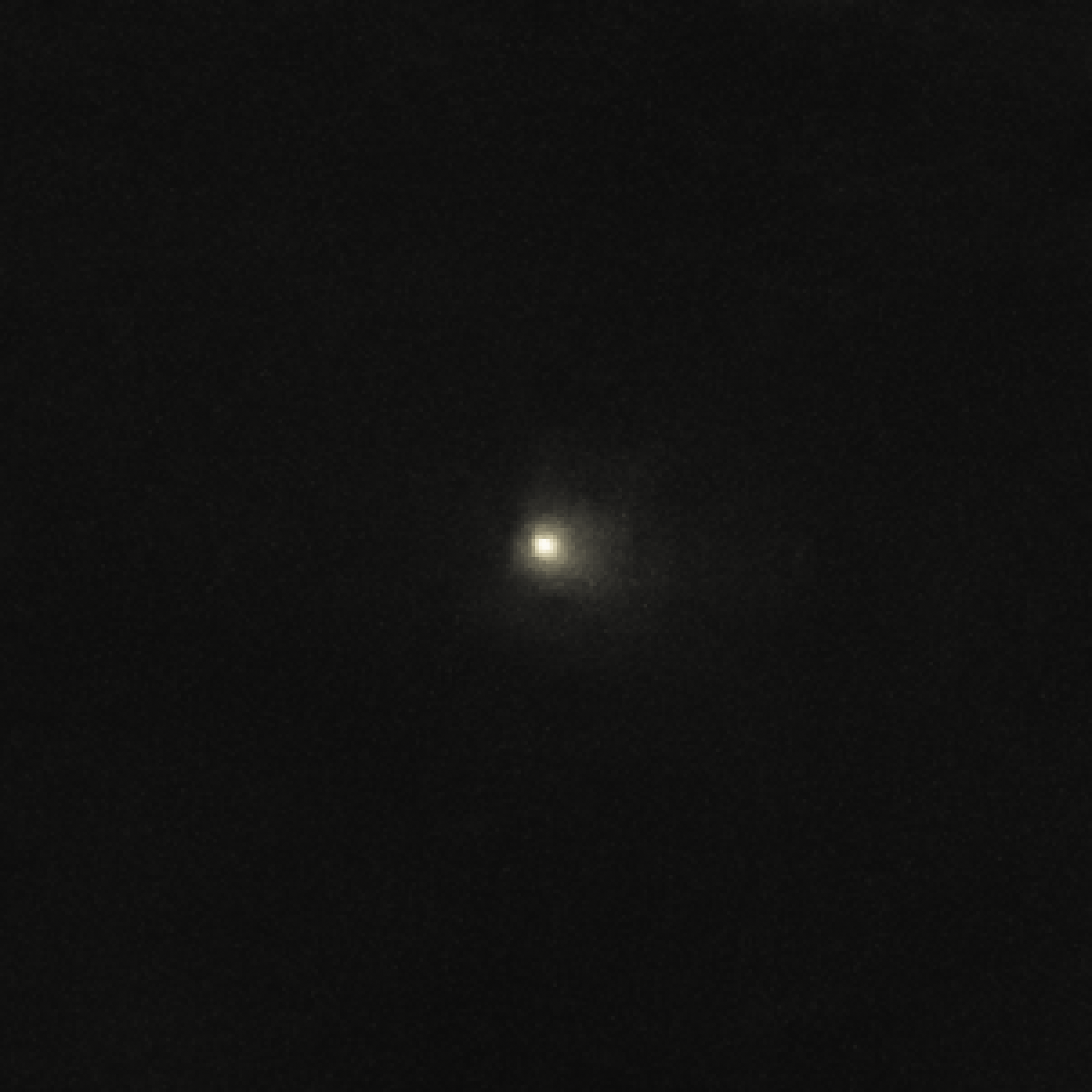
- Comet PANSTARRS photographed by Karen Jean Meech from ESO on 29 April 2016

Discovery
- Discovered by: Pan-STARRS; Richard J. Wainscoat, et al.
- Discovery site: Haleakala Observatory
- Discovery date: 22 September 2014

Orbital characteristics
- Epoch: 8 October 2014 (JD 2456938.5)
- Observation arc: 57 days
- Number of observations: 48
- Aphelion: 174.29 AU
- Perihelion: 2.049 AU
- Semi-major axis: 88.168 AU
- Eccentricity: 0.97676
- Orbital period: ~830 years
- Inclination: 169.32°
- Longitude of ascending node: 356.05°
- Argument of periapsis: 293.14°
- Mean anomaly: 0.066°
- Last perihelion: 13 August 2014
- Next perihelion: ~2840s
- T_{Jupiter}: –1.675
- Earth MOID: 1.089 AU
- Jupiter MOID: 0.254 AU

Physical characteristics
- Mean diameter: 0.5–1.4 km (0.31–0.87 mi)
- Comet total magnitude (M1): 17.5

C/2014 S3 (PanSTARRS) is a long-period comet with an approximately 830-year orbit around the Sun. Although it likely originated from the Oort cloud, it has an unusually rocky composition not typically seen in other comets.

== Observational history ==
It was discovered as an apparently asteroid-like object with cometary activity from the 1.8 m (5.9 ft) Pan-STARRS telescope of the Haleakala Observatory on 22 September 2014. Analysis of imagery by Richard J. Wainscoat and Marco Micheli a day later revealed that the new object looked very compact, with an almost stellar-like core and a faint, diffuse emission surrounding it. Follow-up observations from the Very Large Telescope of the European Southern Observatory (ESO) concluded that it has an orbit similar to long-period comets, the very first of a new class of objects called Manx comets alongside C/2013 P2 (PANSTARRS).

== Physical characteristics ==
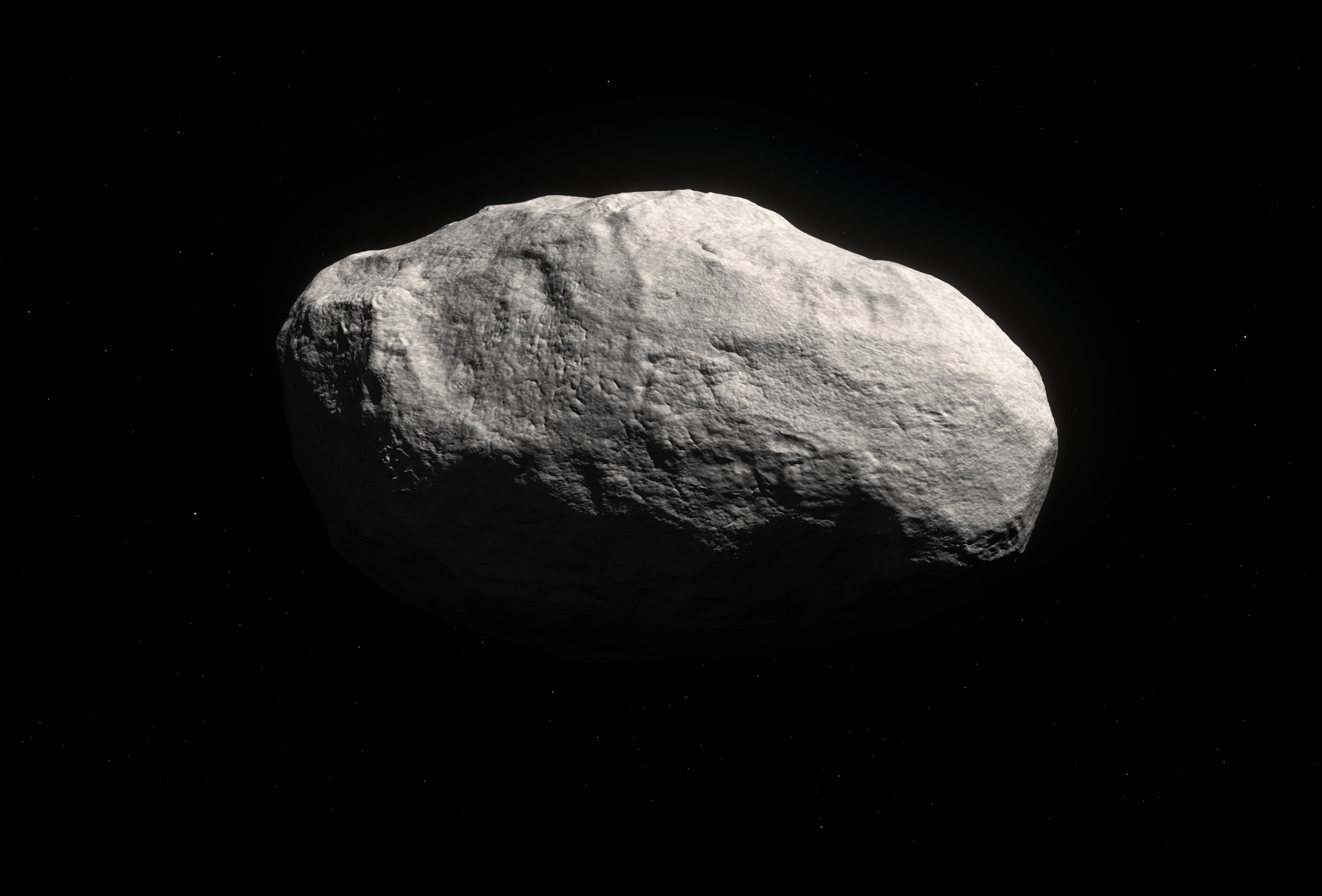
Artist's impression of what the nucleus of C/2014 S3 may look like (Credit: ESO)

With a nucleus estimated to be around 0.5–1.4 km (0.31–0.87 mi) in diameter, C/2014 S3 is the only known rocky object to have originated from the Oort cloud, with a physical composition similar to S-type asteroids commonly found within the main asteroid belt. This unusual composition has led Karen Jean Meech and her colleagues to hypothesize that C/2014 S3 might have formed within the asteroid belt instead of the Oort cloud itself, probably sent into its current orbit caused by the migration of the giant planets early in the formation of the Solar System itself.
