= 493 Griseldis =

Main-belt asteroid

Discovery
- Discovered by: Max Wolf
- Discovery site: Heidelberg
- Discovery date: 7 September 1902

Designations
- Pronunciation: /ɡrɪˈzɛldɪs/
- Alternative designations: 1902 JS

Orbital characteristics
- Epoch 31 July 2016 (JD 2457600.5)
- Uncertainty parameter 0
- Observation arc: 113.61 yr (41495 d)
- Aphelion: 3.6625 AU (547.90 Gm)
- Perihelion: 2.5706 AU (384.56 Gm)
- Semi-major axis: 3.1165 AU (466.22 Gm)
- Eccentricity: 0.17518
- Orbital period (sidereal): 5.50 yr (2009.6 d)
- Mean anomaly: 193.229°
- Mean motion: 0° 10^{m} 44.904^{s} / day
- Inclination: 15.177°
- Longitude of ascending node: 357.360°
- Argument of perihelion: 47.140°

Physical characteristics
- Dimensions: 46.41±4.1 km
- Synodic rotation period: 51.940 h (2.1642 d)
- Geometric albedo: 0.0622±0.013
- Spectral type: P
- Apparent magnitude: 14.2 to 17.5
- Absolute magnitude (H): 10.9

493 Griseldis is a fairly dark main-belt asteroid 46 km in diameter.

== Overview ==
Griseldis is suspected of having been impacted by another asteroid in March 2015. Other asteroids suspected of an asteroid-on-asteroid impact include 354P/LINEAR and 596 Scheila which also showed extended features (tails).

The asteroid was observed with the Subaru Telescope (8m), the Magellan Telescopes (6.5), and also the University of Hawaii 2.2 m telescope in early 2015. The activity was detected on the Subaru in late March, and confirmed on the Magellan telescope a few days later (which is in Chile), but no activity was seen by April. Also, no activity was seen in archived images from 2010 or 2012 according to a University of Hawaii press release.

== See also ==
- 354P/LINEAR
- 596 Scheila
- P/2016 G1 (PanSTARRS)
