= 596 Scheila =

Main-belt asteroid

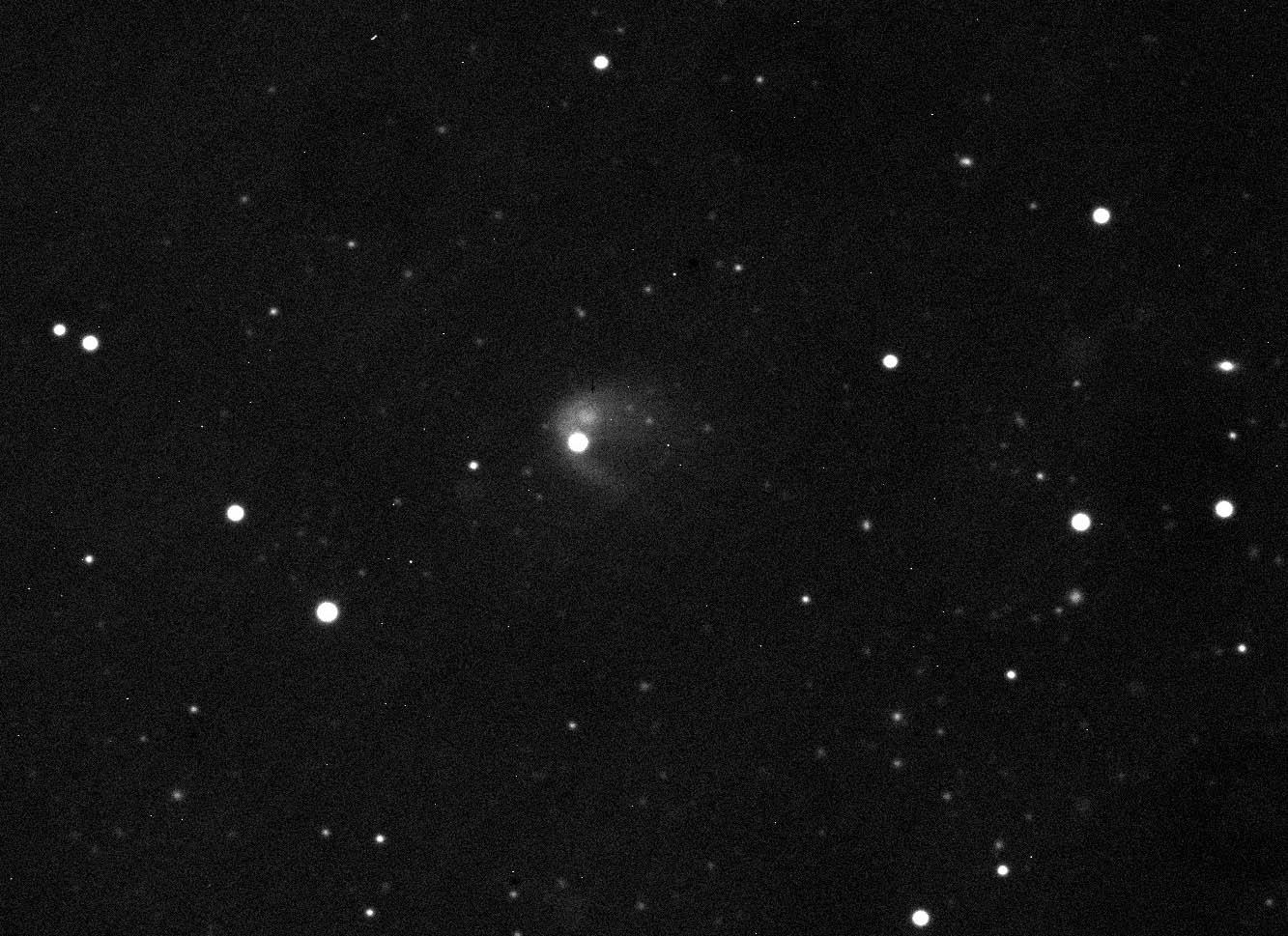
- 596 Scheila outbursting as seen in a 5 min photo with a 24" telescope

Discovery
- Discovered by: August Kopff
- Discovery site: Heidelberg Observatory
- Discovery date: 21 February 1906

Designations
- Pronunciation: /ˈʃiːlə/
- Named after: Sheila
- Minor planet category: main-belt main-belt comet

Orbital characteristics
- Epoch 4 September 2017 (JD 2458000.5)
- Uncertainty parameter 0
- Observation arc: 111.19 yr (40,611 days)
- Aphelion: 3.4062 AU
- Perihelion: 2.4490 AU
- Semi-major axis: 2.9276 AU
- Eccentricity: 0.1635
- Orbital period (sidereal): 5.01 yr (1,830 days)
- Mean anomaly: 21.266°
- Mean motion: 0° 11^{m} 48.48^{s} / day
- Inclination: 14.661°
- Longitude of ascending node: 70.606°
- Argument of perihelion: 175.16°

Physical characteristics
- Mean radius: 56.67±1.15 km (IRAS)
- Mass: (8.1±2.1)×10^{17} kg (Note: Calculated from its standard gravitational parameter GM = 0.054±0.014 km^{3}/s^{2}.)
- Mean density: 2.0 g/cm^{3} (assumed); 2.5 g/cm^{3} (assumed); 0.38 g/cm^{3} (Note: Assuming a diameter of 160 km.)
- Equatorial escape velocity: 60 m/s (calculated); 75 m/s (calculated)
- Synodic rotation period: 15.8480 h (0.66033 d)
- Geometric albedo: 0.0379±0.002
- Spectral type: PCD (Tholen); T (SMASSII)
- Apparent magnitude: 11.67 to 15.32
- Absolute magnitude (H): 8.90

596 Scheila is a main-belt asteroid and main-belt comet orbiting the Sun. It was discovered on 21 February 1906 by August Kopff from Heidelberg. Kopff named the asteroid after a female English student with whom he was acquainted.

== Overview ==
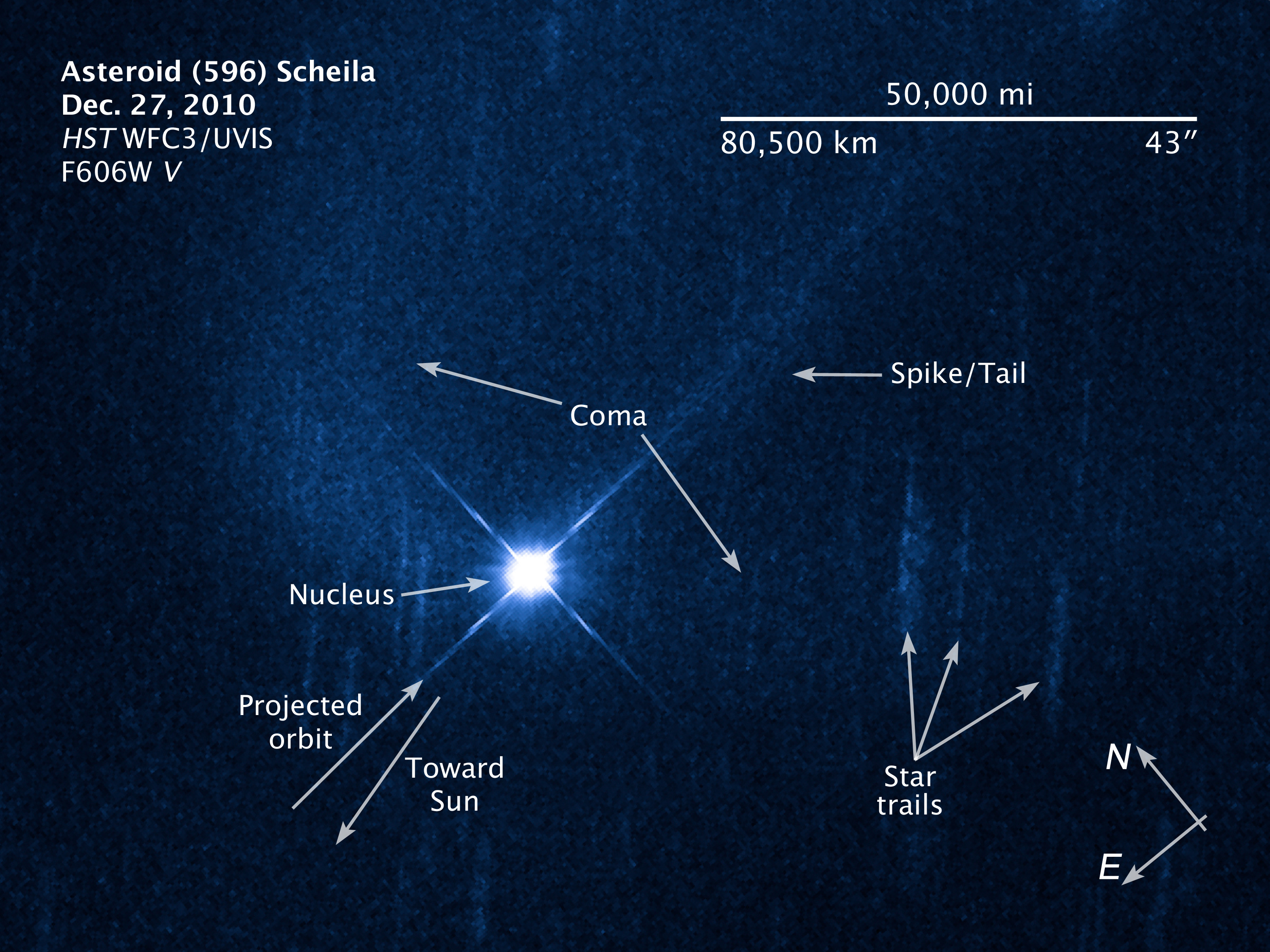
Scheila imaged by the Hubble Space Telescope on 7 December 2010, with visible features marked.

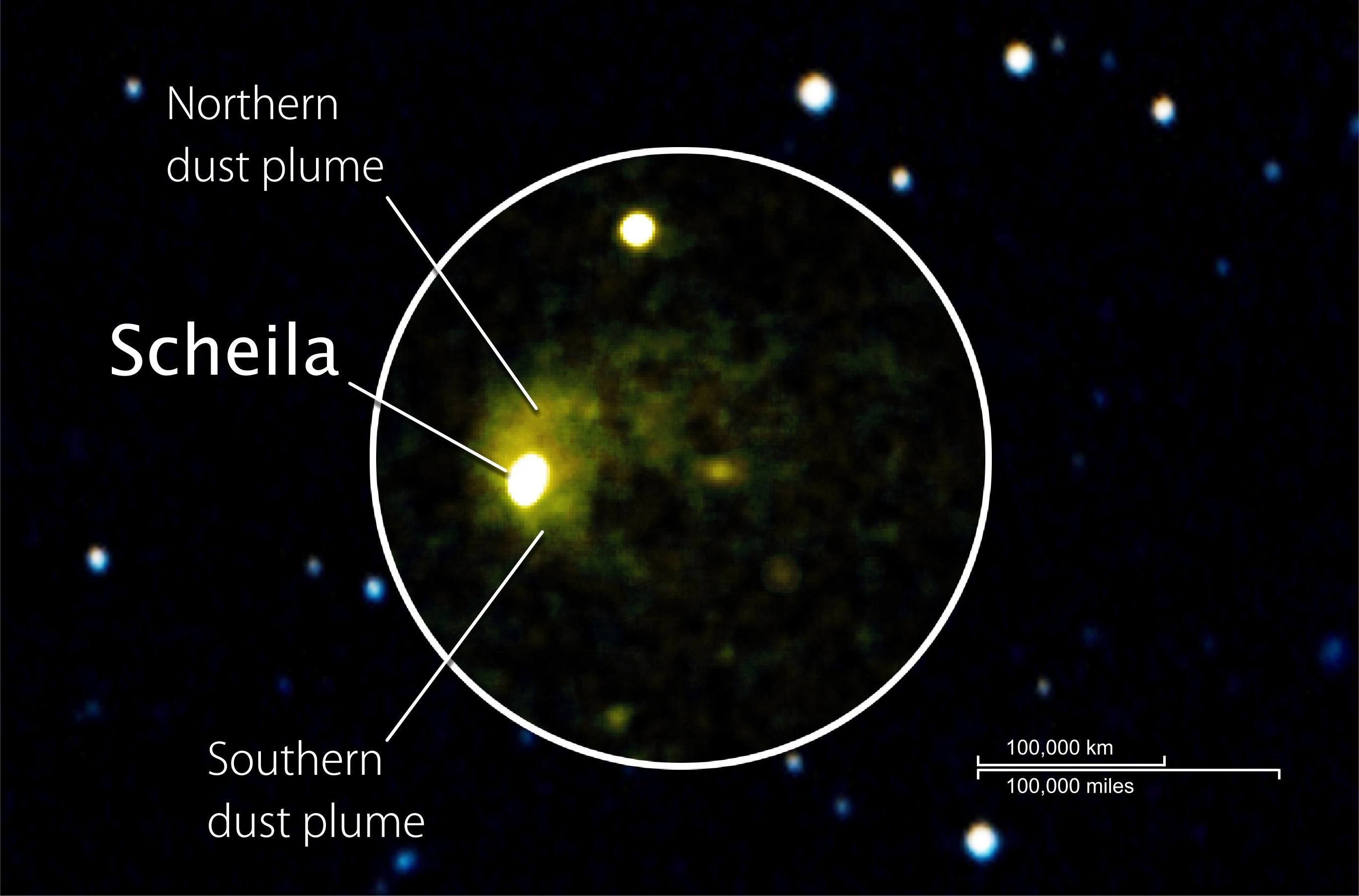
Scheila imaged by Neil Gehrels Swift Observatory's ultraviolet-optical telescope on 15 December 2010

On 11 December 2010, Steve Larson of the Catalina Sky Survey detected a comet-like appearance to asteroid Scheila: it displayed a "coma" of about magnitude 13.5. Inspection of archival Catalina Sky Survey observations showed the activity was triggered between 11 November 2010 and 3 December. Imaging with the 2-meter Faulkes Telescope North revealed a linear tail in the anti-sunward direction and an orbital tail, indicative of larger slower particles.

When first detected it was unknown what drove the ejecta plumes. Scheila's gravity is too large for electrostatics to launch dust. Cometary outgassing could not be ruled out until detailed spectroscopic observations indicated the absence of gas in Scheila's plumes. Observations by the Hubble Space Telescope and the Neil Gehrels Swift Observatory's ultraviolet-optical telescope make it most likely that Scheila was impacted at ~5 km/s by a previously unknown asteroid ~35 meters in diameter. Each asteroid the size of Scheila might be hit by an impactor 10–100 meters in diameter approximately every 1000 years, so with 200 asteroids of this size or bigger in the asteroid belt, a collision can be observed as often as every 5 years.

As a consequence of the 2010 impact, the surface spectrum of Scheila changed, from a moderately red T-type spectrum to a more reddish D-type spectrum, showing how "fresh" material weathers over time in space. This is similar to laboratory experiments done on the Tagish Lake meteorite.

Scheila last came to perihelion on 2022 May 26.

== See also ==
- 354P/LINEAR
- 493 Griseldis – another main-belt asteroid collision in 2015
- P/2016 G1 (PanSTARRS)
