= Msondo =

Swahili drum

The msondo (or msondro) is a type of drum played in the Swahili-speaking world, including Zanzibar and the Comoros. It is featured in the region's genre of taarab or twarab music.

== Construction ==
The Zanzibari version is described as "a slightly tapered, open-ended drum approximately 3 feet tall"

The Comorian version is described as made of a terra-cotta pitcher topped with goatskin.
