= 354P/LINEAR =

Active asteroid

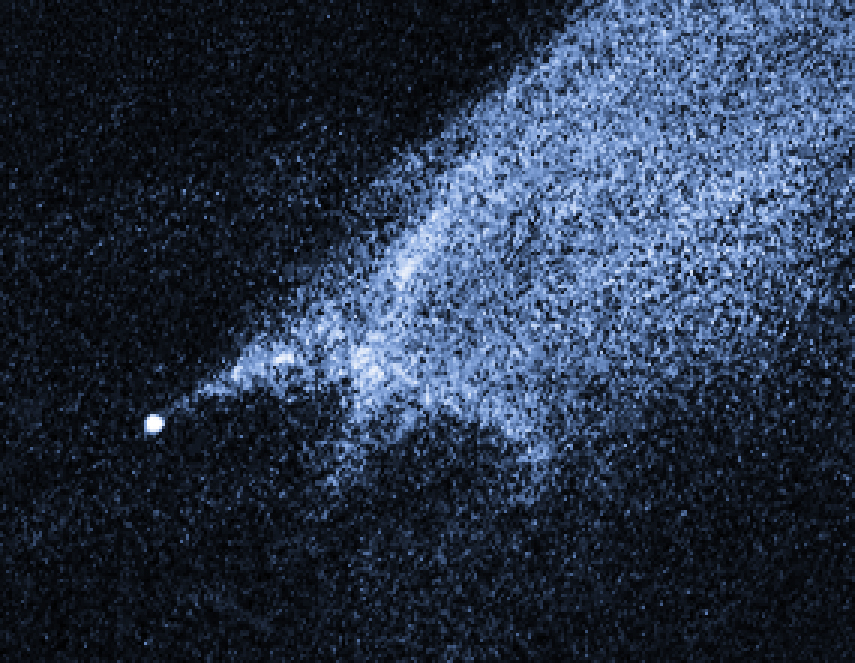
- Hubble Space Telescope image of 354P/LINEAR with dusty impact debris on 2 February 2010

Discovery
- Discovered by: LINEAR (704)
- Discovery date: 6 January 2010

Designations
- Minor planet category: Asteroid; Small Solar System body

Orbital characteristics
- Epoch 13 February 2014 (JD 2456701.5 )
- Uncertainty parameter 3
- Aphelion: 2.5758 AU (Q)
- Perihelion: 2.0035 AU (q)
- Semi-major axis: 2.2897 AU (a)
- Eccentricity: 0.12497
- Orbital period (sidereal): 3.4648 yr
- Mean anomaly: 75.964° (M)
- Inclination: 5.2561°
- Longitude of ascending node: 320.24°
- Time of perihelion: 2 April 2027
- Argument of perihelion: 132.73°
- Jupiter MOID: 2.5831 AU
- T_{Jupiter}: 3.583

Physical characteristics
- Dimensions: 172.4 × 88.8 m
- Mean diameter: 123.8+33.6 −18.4 m
- Synodic rotation period: 11.36±0.02 h
- Albedo: unknown
- Apparent magnitude: ~18-20
- Absolute magnitude (H): 21.3±0.6

354P/LINEAR, provisionally designated P/2010 A2 (LINEAR), is a small main-belt asteroid that was impacted by another asteroid sometime before 2010. It was discovered by the Lincoln Near-Earth Asteroid Research (LINEAR) at Socorro, New Mexico on 6 January 2010. The asteroid possesses a dusty, X-shaped, comet-like debris trail that has remained nearly a decade since impact. This was the first time a small-body collision had been observed; since then, minor planet 596 Scheila has also been seen to undergo a collision, in late 2010. The tail is created by millimeter-sized particles being pushed back by solar radiation pressure.

== Discovery ==
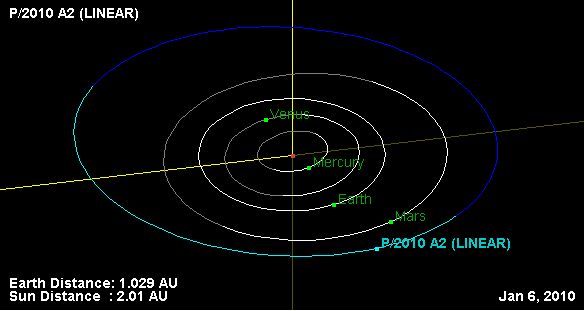
Orbit of P/2010 A2 at the time of its discovery

P/2010 A2 was discovered on 6 January 2010 by Lincoln Near-Earth Asteroid Research (LINEAR) using a 1-meter (39 in) reflecting telescope with a CCD camera. It was LINEAR's 193rd comet discovery. It has been observed over a 112-day arc of the 3.5 year orbit. It appears to have come to perihelion (closest approach to the Sun) around the start of December 2009, about a month before it was discovered.

== Orbit ==
With an aphelion (furthest distance from the Sun) of only 2.6 AU, P/2010 A2 spends all of its time inside of the frost line at 2.7 AU. Beyond the frostline volatile ices are generally more common. Early observations did not detect water vapor or other gases. Within less than a month of its discovery it was doubtful that the tail of P/2010 A2 was generated via active outgassing from sublimation of ices hidden beneath the crust. Early modeling indicated that the asteroid became active in late March 2009, reached maximum activity in early June 2009, and eased activity in early December 2009.

354P was originally thought to belong to the Flora family, an asteroid family produced by a disruptive collision more than 100 million years ago. The Flora family of asteroids may be the source of the Chicxulub impactor, a possible culprit in the extinction of the non-avian dinosaurs. However, subsequent studies on 354P's dynamics have instead shown an association with the Baptistina family, estimated to be around 100–320 million years old, and a refuted candidate for the Chicxulub Impactor after being ruled out by a Wide-field Infrared Survey Explorer (WISE) study. One asteroid of the Flora family, 2010 AA_{15}, was initially suspected to have collided with P/2010 A2 due to their very similar orbits, but was later deemed a coincidence.

== Cause of activity ==
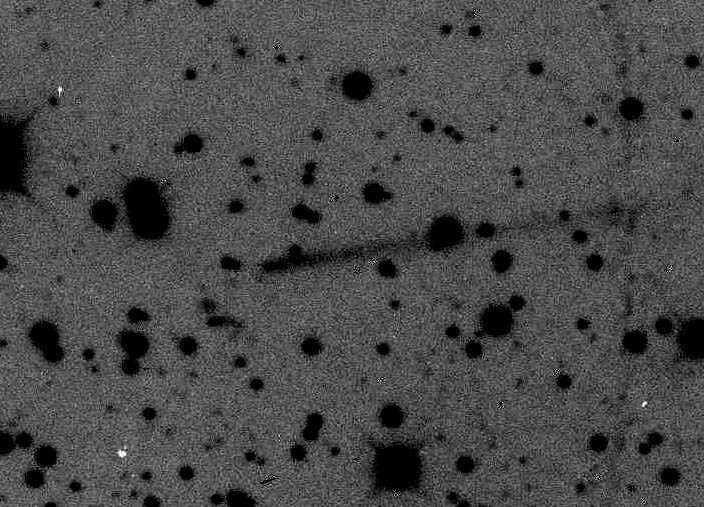
354P/LINEAR as seen an 8 min photo with a 24" telescope

Observations with the Hubble Space Telescope and the narrow angle camera on board the Rosetta spacecraft indicate that the dust trail seen was probably created by the impact of a small meter size object on the larger asteroid in February or March 2009, although it cannot be ruled out that the asteroid's rotation increased from solar radiation resulting in a loss of mass that formed a comet-like tail.

P/2010 A2 is likely about 150 meters (490 feet) in diameter. Even when it was discovered it was suspected of being less than 500 meters in diameter.

Debris field P/2010 A2 is likely the debris left over from a recent collision between two very small asteroids.	Surviving fragment Surviving fragment seen to the lower left of debris field

== See also ==
- 493 Griseldis
- 596 Scheila
- P/2016 G1 (PanSTARRS)
