= ʻUliʻuli =

ʻUlīʻulī are Hawaiian feathered gourd rattles that are occasionally used as instruments in the traditional Hawaiian dance, hula. This instrument is used in both ʻauana and kahiko hula dances. They are vibrantly colored feather gourd rattles used in kahiko performances to maintain timing and to enhance other sounds like chanting or the pounding of an ipu.

== Materials ==
ʻUlīʻulī are made from Calabash gourds filled with sand, aliʻi poe seeds, or pebbles. The handle is made of strips of rattan. The top of the instrument is made of kapa. Assorted feathers are gathered to be applied to the top as a cap.

== Construction ==
The ʻulīʻulī are made of various materials and take time to assemble properly. To make the base where the rattling sound is made, a calabash gourd is hollowed out and dried until hardened. Once the gourd is dried, it is filled with aliʻi poe (Canna) seeds. The base filled with the aliʻi poe seeds, is then attached to a stick wrapped with rattan for the handle by making holes at the top of the gourd and looping the strips of rattan through the holes. Kapa material is used for the cap and attached to the top end of the handle. Assorted feathers, commonly red and yellow feathers or hackle feathers, are attached to make the cap covering the top of the instrument. Some ʻulīʻulī are made with kapa material attached to the center of the feather cap. Patterns stamped on the kapa material using ʻohe kāpala, flat carved bamboo sticks. Several plants like achiote, ʻōlena turmeric, ʻukiʻuki (Dianella sandwicensis), noni Indian mulberry, kukui candlenut tree, and ʻākala raspberry can be ground up and mixed with water to make natural ink dyes for stamping designs onto the kapa.

== Traditional uses ==
ʻUlīʻulī are used in traditional Hawaiian hula dances. Hula dancers make rattling sounds with the ʻulīʻulī by shaking or tapping the base against the body. Hula kahiko are performed to honor the gods and entertain the royal court while preserving orally transmitted narratives and genealogies. ʻUlīʻulī are used in kahiko performances to maintain timing and to enhance sounds created simultaneously through chanting and other instruments like the ipu and pūʻili. Hula ʻauana, a more modern style of hula, are performed for a larger, global audience and have broadened meanings to incorporate narratives about love and Hawaiian identity.

== Other Hawaiian instruments ==
=== Ipu ===
Ipu is a percussion instrument made from gourds that is often used to provide a beat for hula dancing.

=== Pūʻili ===
Pūʻili are wooden rhythm sticks used in pairs by dancers. Pūʻili are made from bamboo and are about 20 inches in length. Slits are cut in the bamboo lengthwise with strands removed so that the bamboo rattles when moved.

=== ʻIliʻili ===
ʻIliʻili are water-worn lava stones used by dancers in a staccato rhythm during a dance. Depending on the hula performed, dancers hold two stones in each hand, similar to how chopsticks are held, and make clicking noises by striking the stones together.

=== Drums: pahu and kilu ===
The pahu, or hula drum, is considered to be a sacred instrument and is the primary instrument used by the kumu hula also known as the instructors. The pahu guides the dancers, dictating the pace of the dance with the rhythm of the drum. Dancers place the drum on the ground or strap it to their thigh and play it during the hula.

Another drum used is the small, light-weight knee drum called a kilu or pūniu, which is made out of a halved coconut and animal skin membrane. The drum usually accompanies the pahu. In the past, pahu drums were usually made of breadfruit trees until coconut became more prevalent. The drums range from one to four feet in height. In pre-contact Hawaii, the covering of the pahu drum was made with shark skin, but has since been substituted with cowhide.
