= Manx comet =

Class of rocky minor celestial body

A Manx comet is a class of rocky minor celestial bodies that have a long-period comet orbit. Unlike most bodies on a long-period comet orbit which typically sport long, bright tails, a Manx comet is tailless, more typical of an inner Solar System asteroid. The nickname comes from the Manx breed of tailless cat. Examples include C/2013 P2 (PANSTARRS), discovered on 4 August 2013, which has an orbital period greater than 51 million years, and C/2014 S3 (PANSTARRS), discovered on 22 September 2014, which is thought to originate from the Oort cloud and could help explain the formation of the Solar System.
