= P/2016 G1 (PanSTARRS) =

Active asteroid

Discovery
- Discovered by: Robert Weryk; Richard Wainscoat
- Discovery site: Pan-STARRS 1 Haleakala Observatory
- Discovery date: 1 April 2016

Designations
- Minor planet category: Asteroid belt

Orbital characteristics
- Epoch 30 April 2016 (JD 2457508.5)
- Observation arc: 198 days
- Aphelion: 3.126 AU
- Perihelion: 2.040 AU
- Semi-major axis: 2.583 AU
- Orbital period (sidereal): 4.152 years
- Mean anomaly: 295.62°
- Inclination: 10.968°
- Longitude of ascending node: 204.07°
- Argument of perihelion: 111.28°
- Earth MOID: 1.057 AU

Physical characteristics
- Dimensions: 200–400 m (660–1,310 ft)
- Absolute magnitude (H): 16.1

P/2016 G1 (PanSTARRS) was a main-belt asteroid that was destroyed by an impact event on 6 March 2016.

== Observational history ==
It was discovered by Robert Weryk and Richard Wainscoat of the Pan-STARRS 1 survey at Haleakala Observatory. The object was initially thought to be an Encke-type comet because of its diffuse appearance, so it received the periodic comet designation P/2016 G1. After further analysis, what had initially appeared to be a comet's halo turned out to be rubble from a collision. By November 2019, analysis suggested the collision had occurred on 6 March 2016, and the asteroid was struck by a smaller object that may have massed only 1.0 kg (2.2 lb), and was traveling at 11,000 mph (18,000 km/h). P/2016 G1's diameter was between 200 m (660 ft) and 400 m (1,300 ft). The asteroid had completely disintegrated by 2017.

Astronomers were able to use the asteroid's rubble to determine the date of the collision, since the dispersion of dust was inversely proportional to its size.

== See also ==
- 354P/LINEAR
- 493 Griseldis
- 596 Scheila
